= The Stylistics discography =

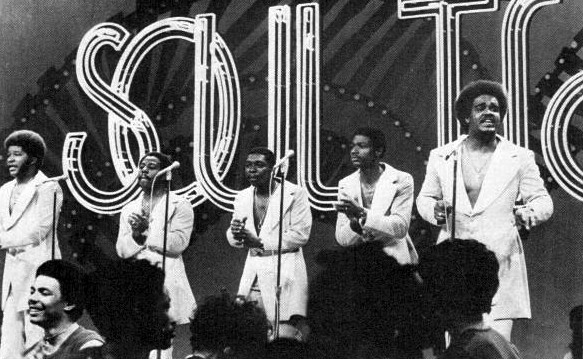
- Soul Train in 1974. From left to right: Airrion Love, James Smith, James Dunn, Herb Murrell, and Russell Thompkins Jr.
- Studio albums: 23
- Compilation albums: 11
- Singles: 50
- Top Ten Singles: 13
- Platinum/Gold/Silver Albums: 13

This is the discography of American R&B/soul vocal group The Stylistics.

== Albums ==
=== Studio albums ===
Year	Album	Peak chart positions					Certifications	Record label
Year	Album	US	US R&B	AUS	CAN	UK	Certifications	Record label
1971	The Stylistics	23	3	23	38	42	RIAA: Gold	Avco
1972	Round 2	32	3	—	—	26	RIAA: Gold	Avco
1973	Rockin' Roll Baby	66	5	43	92	42	BPI: Silver	Avco
1974	Let's Put It All Together	14	4	63	8	26	RIAA: Gold; BPI: Silver	Avco
1974	Heavy ^{[A]}	43	8	—	38	36	BPI: Silver	Avco
1975	Thank You Baby	72	9	—	—	5	BPI: Gold	Avco
1975	You Are Beautiful	99	12	100	—	26	BPI: Silver	Avco
1976	Fabulous	117	32	—	—	21	BPI: Silver	H&L
1976	Once Upon a Juke Box	209	45	—	—	—		H&L
1977	Sun & Soul	—	78	—	—	—		H&L
1977	Wonder Woman	—	—	—	—	—		H&L
1978	In Fashion	—	43	—	—	—		Mercury
1979	Love Spell	—	—	—	—	—		Mercury
1979	The Lion Sleeps Tonight	—	—	—	—	—		Dash
1980	Hurry Up This Way Again	127	11	—	—	—		TSOP
1981	Closer Than Close	210	44	—	—	—		TSOP
1982	1982	—	—	—	—	—		Philadelphia Int'l
1984	Some Things Never Change	—	63	—	—	—		Streetwise
1985	A Special Style	—	—	—	—	—		Streetwise
1991	Love Talk	—	65	—	—	—		Amherst
1992	Christmas	—	—	—	—	—		Amherst
1996	Love Is Back in Style	—	—	—	—	—		Bellmark
2008	That Same Way	—	—	—	—	—		LAC Mgmt
2025	Falling in Love with My Girl	—	—	—	—	—		
"—" denotes a recording that did not chart or was not released in that territory.

- ^{A} Heavy was released under the title From the Mountain in the UK.

=== Compilation albums ===
Year	Album	Peak chart positions				Certifications	Record label
Year	Album	US	US R&B	CAN	UK	Certifications	Record label
1975	The Best of the Stylistics	41	13	40	1	BPI: Platinum	Avco
1976	The Best of the Stylistics Volume II	—	—	—	1	BPI: Gold	H&L
1979	Hits	—	—	—	—		H&L
1985	The Best of the Stylistics	—	—	—	—		Amherst
1985	All-Time Classics	—	—	—	—		Amherst
1985	The Best of the Stylistics, Vol. 2	—	—	—	—		Amherst
1985	Greatest Love Hits	—	—	—	—		Amherst
1992	The Greatest Hits of the Stylistics	—	—	—	34		Mercury
1996	The Best of the Stylistics	—	—	—	—	BPI: Platinum	Spectrum Music
2005	The Very Best of the Stylistics… and More!	—	—	—	—		Amherst
2007	The Very Best of the Stylistics	—	—	—	30	BPI: Gold	UMTV
"—" denotes a recording that did not chart or was not released in that territory.

== Singles ==
Year	Single	Peak chart positions								Certifications	Album
Year	Single	US	US R&B	US A/C	US Dan	AUS	CAN	IRE	UK	Certifications	Album
1971	"You're a Big Girl Now"	73	7	—	—	—	—	—	—		The Stylistics
1971	"Stop, Look, Listen (To Your Heart)"	39	6	—	—	—	60	—	—		The Stylistics
1971	"You Are Everything"	9	10	24	—	17	25	18	—	RIAA: Gold	The Stylistics
1972	"Betcha by Golly, Wow"	3	2	7	—	83	20	—	13	RIAA: Gold	The Stylistics
1972	"People Make the World Go Round"	25	6	25	—	—	34	—	—		The Stylistics
1972	"I'm Stone in Love with You"	10	4	27	—	92	8	—	9	RIAA: Gold	Round 2
1973	"Break Up to Make Up"	5	5	20	—	—	37	—	34	RIAA: Gold	Round 2
1973	"You'll Never Get to Heaven (If You Break My Heart)"	23	8	4	—	83	35	—	—		Round 2
1973	"Peek-a-Boo"	—	—	—	—	—	—	—	35		Round 2
1973	"Rockin' Roll Baby"	14	3	44	—	65	57	—	6		Rockin' Roll Baby
1974	"You Make Me Feel Brand New"	2	5	6	—	3	3	—	2	RIAA: Gold; BPI: Silver	Let's Put It All Together
1974	"Let's Put It All Together"	18	8	26	—	80	18	—	9		Let's Put It All Together
1974	"Heavy Fallin' Out"	41	4	—	—	—	39	—	—		Heavy
1975	"Star on a TV Show"	47	13	27	—	—	61	8	12		Heavy
1975	"Hey Girl, Come and Get It"	—	—	—	4	—	—	—	—		Heavy
1975	"Thank You Baby"	70	7	—	—	—	85	—	—		Thank You Baby
1975	"Sing Baby Sing"	—	—	—	—	90	—	5	3	BPI: Silver	Thank You Baby
1975	"Can't Give You Anything (But My Love)"	51	18	34	—	36	74	1	1	BPI: Gold	Thank You Baby
1975	"Na-Na Is the Saddest Word"	—	—	—	—	—	—	3	5	BPI: Silver	You Are Beautiful
1975	"Funky Weekend"	76	23	—	—	—	70	6	10		You Are Beautiful
1976	"You Are Beautiful"	79	17	26	—	—	—	—	—		You Are Beautiful
1976	"Can't Help Falling in Love"	—	52	—	—	—	—	4	4		Fabulous
1976	"Because I Love You, Girl"	—	43	—	—	—	—	—	—		Fabulous
1976	"Sixteen Bars"	—	—	—	—	—	—	9	7		Fabulous
1976	"You'll Never Get to Heaven" (EP)	—	—	—	—	—	—	—	24		—N/a
1976	"Only You (And You Alone)"	—	—	—	—	—	—	—	—		Once Upon a Juke Box
1976	"Satin Doll"	—	—	—	—	—	—	—	—		Once Upon a Juke Box
1977	"Shame and Scandal in the Family"	—	87	—	—	—	—	—	—		Sun & Soul
1977	"$7000 and You"	—	—	—	—	—	—	—	24		Sun & Soul
1977	"I'm Coming Home"	—	90	—	—	—	—	—	—		Sun & Soul
1977	"Fool of the Year"	—	—	—	—	—	—	—	—		Wonder Woman
1978	"First Impressions"	—	22	—	—	—	—	—	—		In Fashion
1978	"You're the Best Thing in My Life"	—	—	—	—	—	—	—	—		In Fashion
1979	"Love at First Sight"	—	93	—	—	—	—	—	—		Love Spell
1980	"Hurry Up This Way Again"	—	18	—	—	—	—	—	—		Hurry Up This Way Again
1981	"And I'll See You No More"	—	70	—	—	—	—	—	—		Hurry Up This Way Again
1981	"Driving Me Wild"	—	—	—	51	—	—	—	—		Hurry Up This Way Again
1981	"What's Your Name?"	—	79	—	—	—	—	—	—		Closer Than Close
1981	"Mine All Mine"	—	—	—	—	—	—	—	—		Closer Than Close
1981	"I've Got This Feeling"	—	—	—	—	—	—	—	—		Closer Than Close
1982	"Call on You"	—	—	—	—	—	—	—	—		1982
1982	"We Should Be Lovers"	—	—	—	—	—	—	—	—		1982
1984	"Give a Little Love"	—	47	—	—	—	—	—	—		Some Things Never Change
1985	"Some Things Never Change"	—	86	—	—	—	—	—	—		Some Things Never Change
1985	"Love Is Not the Answer"	—	—	—	—	—	—	—	91		Some Things Never Change
1985	"Row Your Love"	—	—	—	—	—	—	—	—		Some Things Never Change
1986	"Special"	—	77	—	—	—	—	—	—		A Special Style
1986	"Let's Go Rockin' (Tonight)"	—	63	—	—	—	—	—	—		A Special Style
1991	"Love Talk"	—	68	—	—	—	—	—	—		Love Talk
1992	"Always on My Mind"	—	89	—	—	—	—	—	—		Love Talk
"—" denotes a recording that did not chart or was not released in that territory.
