= The Best of The Stylistics =

1975 compilation album by The Stylistics

The Best of the Stylistics

Compilation album by The Stylistics
- Released: February 1975
- Studio: Sigma Sound, Philadelphia; Mediasound, New York City
- Genre: R&B
- Length: 36:19
- Label: Avco; AV 69005
- Producer: Thom Bell, Hugo & Luigi

The Stylistics chronology
Heavy (1974)	The Best of the Stylistics (1975)	Thank You Baby (1975)

Professional ratings
Review scores
Source	Rating
Allmusic	4.5/5 stars
Christgau's Record Guide	A−
Tom Hull – on the Web	B+

The Best of The Stylistics is a compilation album released by the American soul group The Stylistics.

Released in 1975, the album became a big success in the UK when it reached No.1. Hitting the pinnacle three times during the year, the album remained at No.1 for 9 weeks in total. Helped largely by TV advertising, it became the biggest album of the group's career and the UK's top seller of 1975. It also reached No.41 in the US - although their popularity was beginning to decline there.

Following its success, several albums entered the charts including their latest, Thank You Baby, which reached No.5 at the same time the compilation was No.1.

Another version of the album (The Very Best of The Stylistics) with a similar cover but with an alternate track listing was released by H & L Records (Phonogram) in 1983. The album has since been released on CD as a compilation of this and Volume two.

== Track listing ==
All tracks are written by Thom Bell and Linda Creed, except where noted.

Side one
No.	Title	Writer(s)	Length
1.	"You Make Me Feel Brand New"		4:45
2.	"Betcha by Golly, Wow"		3:17
3.	"Rockin' Roll Baby"		3:15
4.	"Break Up to Make Up"	Thom Bell, Creed, Kenneth Gamble	4:00
5.	"You're a Big Girl Now"	Marty Bryant, Robert Douglas	3:14

Side two
No.	Title	Writer(s)	Length
6.	"I'm Stone in Love with You"	Thom Bell, Creed, Anthony Bell	3:12
7.	"Heavy Fallin' Out"	Hugo & Luigi, George David Weiss	5:18
8.	"Let's Put It All Together"	Hugo & Luigi, George David Weiss	2:55
9.	"You Are Everything"		2:55
10.	"People Make the World Go Round"		3:28

  - Original versions of this album had "Stop, Look, Listen to Your Heart" as track 7.

== Charts ==
Chart (1975)	Peak position
US Top LPs & Tape	41
US Top Soul LPs	13
UK Albums Chart	1

== Certifications ==
Region	Certification	Certified units/sales
Hong Kong (IFPI Hong Kong)	Gold	10,000^{*}
^{*} Sales figures based on certification alone.

== The Best of the Stylistics Volume II ==
The Best of the Stylstics Volume II Weekend

Compilation album by The Stylistics
- Released: September 1976
- Studio: Mediasound, New York City
- Genre: R&B
- Length: 42:04
- Label: H&L; 9109 010
- Producer: Hugo & Luigi

The Stylistics chronology
Fabulous (1976)	The Best of the Stylstics Volume II Weekend (1976)	Once Upon a Juke Box (1976)

Professional ratings
Review scores
Source	Rating
AllMusic	4/5 stars

A follow-up compilation was released the following year, subtitled Volume 2. The 1976 album mirrored the earlier success by also reaching No.1 in the UK Charts. This album featured the group's first No.1 single "Can't Give You Anything (But My Love)", which had been released since the previous compilation.

This album was released on the newly founded H&L Records, which had been formed after the break-up of Avco Records, The Stylistics being their biggest act.

=== Track listing ===
All tracks are written by Hugo & Luigi and George David Weiss.

Side one
No.	Title	Length
1.	"Can't Give You Anything (But My Love)"	3:13
2.	"Hey Girl, Come and Get It"	3:30
3.	"Sixteen Bars"	3:40
4.	"The Miracle"	4:22
5.	"Love Is the Answer"	3:00
6.	"You Are Beautiful"	4:08

Side two
No.	Title	Length
7.	"Can't Help Falling in Love"	3:16
8.	"Sing Baby Sing"	2:50
9.	"Star on a TV Show"	4:10
10.	"Na-Na Is the Saddest Word"	2:58
11.	"Thank You Baby"	3:43
12.	"Funky Weekend"	3:14

=== Charts ===
Chart (1976)	Peak position
UK Albums Chart	1
