= Rockin' Roll Baby =

Studio album by The Stylistics
- Released: November 1973
- Studio: Sigma Sound, Philadelphia, Pennsylvania
- Genre: R&B, soul
- Length: 42:36
- Label: Avco
- Producer: Thom Bell

The Stylistics chronology
| Round 2 (1972) | Rockin' Roll Baby (1973) | Let's Put It All Together (1974) |

Singles from Rockin' Roll Baby
- 1. "Rockin' Roll Baby" Released: October 1973; 2. "Only for the Children" Released: 1974

Professional ratings
Review scores
| Source | Rating |
|---|---|
| AllMusic | 4/5 stars |
| Christgau's Record Guide | C+ |

Rockin' Roll Baby is the third studio album recorded by American R&B group The Stylistics, released in November 1973 on the Avco label. It was produced by Thom Bell and recorded at Sigma Sound Studio North in Philadelphia. This was the group's last album produced by Bell.

Lead vocals are by Russell Thompkins, Jr.

== Background ==
While on Avco, they began working with producer/songwriter Thom Bell, and along with songwriter Linda Creed created a bunch of hit singles that used lavish production backing the lead vocals of Russell Thompkins, Jr. Every single that Bell produced was a hit. The album includes the original full version of the song, "You Make Me Feel Brand New".

== Chart performance ==
The album reached No. 66 on the Billboard LPs chart and No. 5 on the R&B albums chart. The title track reached No. 14 on the Billboard Hot 100, No. 3 on the R&B singles chart, and No. 6 on the UK Singles Chart.

== Track listing ==
All tracks are written by Thom Bell and Linda Creed, except where noted.

Side one
| No. | Title | Writer(s) | Length |
|---|---|---|---|
| 1. | "Only for the Children" | | 4:38 |
| 2. | "Could This Be the End?" | Joseph B. Jefferson, Bruce Hawes, Charles Simmons | 4:09 |
| 3. | "Let Them Work It Out" | | 3:58 |
| 4. | "Make It Last" | | 2:59 |
| 5. | "Pay Back Is a Dog" | Thom Bell, Kenneth Gamble | 4:31 |

Side two
| No. | Title | Writer(s) | Length |
|---|---|---|---|
| 6. | "Love Comes Easy" | | 4:58 |
| 7. | "There's No Reason" | Joseph B. Jefferson, Bruce Hawes | 3:58 |
| 8. | "Rockin' Roll Baby" | | 4:27 |
| 9. | "You Make Me Feel Brand New" (long version, not the 1974 hit single version) | | 5:30 |
| 10. | "I Won't Give You Up" | Charles Simmons, Bruce Hawes, Joseph B. Jefferson | 3:38 |

== Personnel ==
- Russell Thompkins Jr. – lead vocals, backing vocals
- Airrion Love – backing vocals, lead vocals on "You Make Me Feel Brand New"
- James Smith, Herb Murrell, James Dunn – backing vocals
- Linda Creed, Barbara Ingram, Evette Benton, Carla Benson – additional backing vocals
- Norman Harris, Bobby Eli – guitar
- Ronnie Baker – bass
- Earl Young – drums
- Larry Washington – timbales, congas, bongos
- Vince Montana – percussion
- Thom Bell – keyboards
- Joseph DeAngelis, Milton Fipps – French horn
- Jack Faith – alto saxophone, flute
- John Davis – tenor saxophone, baritone saxophone
- Bobby Hartzell, Rocco Bene – trumpet, flugelhorn, piccolo trumpet
- Freddy Joiner, Bobby Moore – tenor trombone
- Richard Genevese – bass trombone
- Walter File – harp
- Don Renaldo and His Swinging Strings – strings

== Charts ==
| Chart (1973–74) | Peak position |
|---|---|
| Australia (Kent Music Report) | 43 |
| U.S. Billboard Top LPs | 66 |
| U.S. Billboard Top Soul LPs | 5 |
| UK Albums Chart | 42 |

Singles

| Year | Single | Peak chart positions | | | |
| Year | Single | US | US R&B | US A/C | UK |
|---|---|---|---|---|---|
| 1973 | "Rockin' Roll Baby" | 14 | 3 | 44 | 6 |
