= Diana & Marvin =

Studio album by Diana Ross and Marvin Gaye
- Released: October 26, 1973
- Recorded: 1971–1973
- Studios: Motown Recording Studios, Hollywood, California
- Genres: Soul; smooth soul; R&B
- Length: 30:01
- Labels: Motown; M5-124V1; Universal Music
- Producers: Hal Davis; Berry Gordy; Margaret Gordy; Bob Gaudio; Ashford & Simpson

Diana Ross chronology
Touch Me in the Morning (1973)	Diana & Marvin (1973)	Last Time I Saw Him (1973)

Marvin Gaye chronology
Let's Get It On (1973)	Diana & Marvin (1973)	Anthology (1974)

Singles from Diana & Marvin
- 1. "You're a Special Part of Me" Released: September 1973; 2. "My Mistake (Was to Love You)" Released: January 17, 1974; 3. "You Are Everything" Released: January 1974; 4. "Don't Knock My Love" Released: June 18, 1974; 5. "Stop, Look, Listen (To Your Heart)" Released: May 5, 1974

Diana & Marvin is a duets album by American soul musicians Diana Ross and Marvin Gaye, released October 26, 1973, on Motown. Recording sessions for the album took place between 1971 and 1973 at Motown Recording Studios in Hollywood, California. Gaye and Ross were widely recognized at the time as two of the top pop music performers.

Diana & Marvin became a critical and commercial success that sold over a million copies worldwide. The album was remastered and re-released on compact disc with four bonus tracks on February 6, 2001.

== Background ==
Initial plans to make the Ross/Gaye duet album began as early as 1970, but due to Gaye being in a personal lull following the death of Tammi Terrell, Motown failed to bring the two together and instead focused on Ross' emerging solo career, which didn't take off until the release of her cover of Gaye and Terrell's "Ain't No Mountain High Enough", which became an international hit; however, during that time, Gaye had made a promise that he would never again record a duet with a female performer because he felt they were cursed by him recording with them (Mary Wells abruptly left Motown following the end of the Together album and her career failed to recover, Kim Weston also abruptly left the label following the end of their Take Two sessions and Terrell's complications with a brain tumor, which later resulted in her death, made duets between her and Gaye difficult).

In mid-1971, Gaye returned to the charts with the What's Going On album, released on May 21, 1971, which redefined his career and direction. Due to this, Gordy again approached him on doing a duet album with Ross. Though Gaye had insisted he wouldn't record any more duet albums, he later wrote that he felt the move to do a duet album with Ross would increase his popularity with Ross' wider audience.

== Recording ==
Engineer Russ Terrana later recalled that the start of sessions met difficulty as Gaye, who had the habit of coming to recording studios late, came unusually early but was inside the studio smoking reefer. Terrana said when Ross, still pregnant with her first child, daughter Rhonda, walked in, she immediately walked out, upset that Gaye was smoking reefer and told Gordy to stop him from smoking because of her pregnancy, fearing her baby might die from the smoke. When Gordy asked Gaye to put the reefer out, Gaye told him, "if I can't smoke, I can't sing." Eventually, however, Gaye did put the reefer out and Ross re-entered the studio with Gaye recording a cover of Wilson Pickett's "Don't Knock My Love". According to the album's later liner notes, Ross hated "Don't Knock My Love" and reportedly asked Gaye "why are we recording this song?"

Later recording sessions proved to be difficult as Ross had her baby and lay low following Rhonda's birth. She had also finished work on the movie, Lady Sings the Blues. Gaye, in the meantime, was busy on other projects putting future recording sessions in limbo. Due to this, Motown decided to do what they had done with Gaye and Terrell - record them separately. Ross and Gaye ended up recording in different sessions with Terrana mixing the duo's vocals together.

The album would feature the last Ashford & Simpson production for Motown, "Just Say, Just Say", though the duo would later reunite with Ross on her The Boss album. Gaye later said of the experience: "I'm not sure I handled the situation very well. Musically I may have overplayed my hand. I was too cavalier. I should have done everything in the world to make Diana comfortable. After all, she was making movies, recording two or three albums a year, starring in her own TV specials, and about to have a baby. I could have been a little more understanding. But I went the other way. It's hard for me to deal with prima donnas. We were like two spoiled kids going after the same cookie..."

Album sessions dragged on throughout 1971 and into early 1973. Ross reported in an early 1973 interview in Blues & Soul magazine that the album, produced by Ashford & Simpson, was to be titled Art & Honey and was due in September that year. Since the album was not under Gaye's Tamla contract where Gaye had become the first Motown-established artist to have full autonomous creative control, the album was instead issued under the Motown imprint, which Ross recorded with. Motown held the album from being released, as Ross and Gaye had solo albums ready for release. Ross released the solo album, Touch Me in the Morning, which coincidentally included a cover of another Marvin single, "Save the Children", which was included in a socially conscious medley along with the song, "Brown Baby". Gaye released his solo album, Let's Get It On, that August. Both albums brought huge success as both peaked in the top ten with Gaye's album eventually selling more than three million copies, becoming his best-selling Motown album ever surpassing What's Going On.

== Release ==
Motown decided to issue the long-awaited Diana & Marvin album in 1973. Assured that the album would be a success, Motown billed it with Diana Ross' name in front of Gaye's. Gaye recalled he smirked and chuckled at the decision. Gaye tried in vain to get Gordy to allow him to name the album Marvin & Diana and give him production credit; since the album was not issued on Tamla, the producer refused Gaye's demands. Despite a huge promotional push, the album was only a modest success in the U.S. reaching number 26 on the Billboard 200 and number 7 on the R&B albums chart, selling over 500,000 copies in America.

In the United Kingdom, where Gaye and Ross had substantial fan bases, reaching number 6 on the UK albums chart and was certified gold for sales in excess of 100,000 copies. In the States, Motown issued three singles: "You're a Special Part of Me" (number 12 pop, number 4 R&B), "My Mistake (Was to Love You)" (number 19 pop, number 15 R&B) and "Don't Knock My Love" (number 46 pop, number 25 R&B), the latter song went to number one in Brazil. In the UK, two singles were released and they were both covers of Stylistics songs. The first, "Stop, Look, Listen (To Your Heart)", reached number 25 there (the original Stylistics single failed to chart there), while the second, "You Are Everything", became a smash reaching number 5. Despite their initial problems, both Gaye and Ross would tell the press that they enjoyed working on the album, with Gaye telling Soul Train host Don Cornelius on a February 16, 1974 episode that he'd love to work with Ross in the future.

The artists would eventually reunite to sing together for two duets to be featured on the Berry Gordy Sr. tribute album, Pops We Love You in 1978, including the title song, "Pops, We Love You" along with Smokey Robinson and Stevie Wonder, and a pop-gospel tune, "I'll Keep My Light in My Window". Unlike most of the sessions for Diana & Marvin, the two stars recorded the songs in the studio together.

== Reception ==
Professional ratings
Review scores
Source	Rating
AllMusic	4/5 stars
Christgau's Record Guide	B+
Tom Hull	B+
Q	4/5 stars
The New Rolling Stone Album Guide	3.5/5 stars

The album received generally positive reviews upon release. Robert Christgau gave it a B+, saying, "Of the six Motown-composed tracks, only Ashford & Simpson's 'Just Say, Just Say' and the hit, 'My Mistake', have any charm of their own. But this girl-boy duo sound just great on two Bell-Creed songs and the follow-up single, Wilson Pickett's, 'Don't Knock My Love'. And while I suspect it was Marvin who edged Diana into the warmest and loosest—and streetest—performance of her career, maybe it was just the proximity of 'Pledging My Love'."

== Legacy and covers ==
The duo's cover of "Stop, Look, Listen (To Your Heart)" has been sampled and interpolated by several hip-hop artists over the years including 50 Cent, Smilez and Southstar (who had their one and only hit with "Tell Me", which sampled the song), while Ja Rule and Ashanti's "Mesmerize" interpolated the song's melody. Michael McDonald and Toni Braxton re-recorded the duet cover for McDonald's album, Motown II.

"You Are Everything" has also been covered many times including duet versions by Billy Ocean & Elaine Paige and a 1994 version by UK soul singer Melanie Williams and Joe Roberts that became a UK Top 30 hit.

The album's cover featuring Ross and Gaye's hair facing different sides would also be imitated by several artists following its release. In 2001, the album was re-released with four additional songs including three outtakes from the 1972 sessions including "Alone", "The Things I Will Not Miss" and the Ashford & Simpson written and produced "I've Come To Love You So Much", with the duo's 1978 duet, "I'll Keep My Light In My Window" also included on the reissue.

== Track listing ==
=== Side one ===
1. "You Are Everything" (Thom Bell, Linda Creed) – 3:10
2. "Love Twins" (Mel Bolton, Marilyn McLeod) – 3:28
3. "Don't Knock My Love" (Wilson Pickett, Brad Shapiro) – 2:20
4. "You're a Special Part of Me" (Harold Johnson, Andrew Porter, Greg Wright) – 3:35
5. "Pledging My Love" (Don Robey, Ferdinand Washington) – 3:34

=== Side two ===
1. "Just Say, Just Say" (Nickolas Ashford, Valerie Simpson) – 4:10
2. "Stop, Look, Listen (to Your Heart)" (Thom Bell, Linda Creed) – 2:53
3. "I'm Falling in Love with You" (Margaret Gordy) – 2:42
4. "My Mistake (Was to Love You)" (Gloria Jones, Pam Sawyer) – 2:55
5. "Include Me in Your Life" (Mel Bolton, Marilyn McLeod) – 3:04

=== Bonus tracks ===
Bonus cuts featured on the 2001 reissue.

1. "Alone" (Wade Brown, Jr., David Jones) – 3:49
2. "The Things I Will Not Miss" (Hal David, Burt Bacharach)– 3:10
3. "I've Come To Love You So Much" (Nickolas Ashford, Valerie Simpson)– 4:10
4. "I'll Keep My Light in My Window" (Leonard Caston, Theresa McFaddin)– 4:28

== Charts ==
Chart (1974)	Peak position
Australia (Kent Music Report)	26
Canada Top Albums/CDs (RPM)	86
UK Albums (Official Charts)	6
US Billboard 200	26
US Top R&B/Hip-Hop Albums (Billboard)	7
US Cashbox Top Albums	18

== Certifications ==
Region	Certification	Certified units/sales
United Kingdom (BPI)	Gold	100,000^{^}
^{^} Shipments figures based on certification alone.

== Personnel ==
- Arranged By – David Blumberg (tracks: A1 to A3, A5, B4, B5), Gene Page (tracks: B2), James Carmichael (tracks: A4), Paul Riser (tracks: B1)
- Engineer (Recording, Mixing) – Russ Terrana
- Engineer (Recording) – Art Stewart, Cal Harris
- Producer – Nickolas Ashford & Valerie Simpson (tracks: B1), Berry Gordy (tracks: A4), Hal Davis (tracks: A1 to A3, B2, B4, B5), Margaret Gordy (tracks: B3)
- Producer (Assistant & Coordinator) – Suzee Wendy Ikeda
- Producer (Executive) – Berry Gordy
- Producer, Arranged By – Bob Gaudio (tracks: A5), Mark Davis (tracks: B3)
- Vocals – Marvin Gaye, Diana Ross

== Sources ==
- Adrahtas, Tom (2006). Diana Ross: The American Dream Girl; a Lifetime to Get Here. AuthorHouse. ISBN 978-1-42597-140-3.
