= Let's Put It All Together =

1974 album by R&B group The Stylistics

Studio album by The Stylistics
- Released: May 9, 1974
- Studio: Mediasound, New York City
- Genre: R&B
- Length: 37:42
- Label: Avco
- Producer: Hugo & Luigi, Thom Bell

The Stylistics chronology
Rockin' Roll Baby (1973)	Let's Put It All Together (1974)	Heavy (1974)

Singles from Let's Put It All Together
- 1. "You Make Me Feel Brand New" Released: May 5, 1974; 2. "Let's Put It All Together" Released: 1974; 3. "We Can Make It Happen Again" Released: 1974 (Brazil); 4. "Love is the Answer" Released: 1974 (South Africa)

Professional ratings
Review scores
Source	Rating
Allmusic	3/5 stars

Let's Put It All Together is the fourth studio album recorded by American R&B group The Stylistics, released in May 1974 on the Avco label. It was produced by Hugo & Luigi and recorded at Mediasound Studios in New York City. This was the group's first album fully recorded outside of Philadelphia.

== History ==
The album reached #14 on the Billboard 200, their highest ever position on that chart, and #4 on the R&B albums chart. "You Make Me Feel Brand New", which originally appeared in a five-minute version on their previous album, Rockin' Roll Baby, was included in an edited version. This version was released as a single and became a huge hit, reaching #2 on the Billboard Hot 100 and the UK Singles Chart. It also peaked at #5 on the R&B singles chart and #6 on the Easy Listening chart. The title track was also successful, peaking at number #18 on the Billboard Hot 100, their last big hit on that chart, #8 on the R&B singles chart, and #9 on the UK Singles chart. The Hugo & Luigi tracks were arranged and conducted by Van McCoy.

The song "Love Is the Answer" was sampled in E-40's song "Show Me What You Workin' Wit" featuring Too Short, taken from his 2010 album Revenue Retrievin': Night Shift and also received disco treatment as an eight minute instrumental by Van McCoy on a 12-inch record paired with "That Old Black Magic" by The Softones.

== Track listing ==
All tracks are written by Hugo & Luigi and George David Weiss, except where noted.

Side one
No.	Title	Writer(s)	Length
1.	"Let's Put It All Together"		3:25
2.	"I Got a Letter"		3:33
3.	"We Can Make It Happen Again"		3:43
4.	"Keeping My Fingers Cross"	Van McCoy	3:28
5.	"You Make Me Feel Brand New"	Thom Bell, Linda Creed	4:45

Side two
No.	Title	Length
6.	"I Got Time on My Hands"	4:50
7.	"Doin' the Streets"	3:49
8.	"I Take It Out on You"	3:32
9.	"Love Is the Answer" (vocal)	3:00
10.	"Love Is the Answer" (instrumental)	3:37

== Personnel ==
- Russell Thompkins, Jr. – lead vocals
- Airrion Love – backing vocals, co-lead vocals on "We Can Make It Happen", "You Make Me Feel Brand New" and "Doin' the Streets"
- James Smith, Herb Murrell, James Dunn – backing vocals
- Van McCoy – arranger, conductor

== Charts ==
Chart (1974)	Peak
Australia (Kent Music Report)	63
UK Albums Chart	26
US Billboard Top LPs	14
US Billboard Top Soul LPs	4

Singles

Year	Single	Peak chart positions					
Year	Single	US	US R&B	US A/C	AUS	CAN	UK
1974	"You Make Me Feel Brand New"	2	5	6	3	3	2
1974	"Let's Put It All Together"	18	8	26	80	18	9
