= Round 2 (The Stylistics album) =

Studio album by The Stylistics
- Released: October 1972
- Recorded: April 1972
- Studio: Sigma Sound, Philadelphia, Pennsylvania; Regent Sound Studios, New York City
- Genre: R&B
- Length: 37:36
- Label: Avco
- Producer: Thom Bell

The Stylistics chronology
| The Stylistics (1971) | Round 2 (1972) | Rockin' Roll Baby (1973) |

Singles from Round 2
- 1. "I'm Stone in Love with You" Released: 1972; 2. "Break Up to Make Up" Released: 1973; 3. "You'll Never Get to Heaven (If You Break My Heart)" Released: 1973; 4. "Peek-a-Boo" Released: 1973; 5. "You and Me" Released: 1973 (Japan)

Professional ratings
Review scores
| Source | Rating |
|---|---|
| Allmusic | 4.5/5 stars |
| Christgau's Record Guide | B+ |

Round 2 is the second studio album recorded by American R&B group The Stylistics, released in October 1972 on the Avco label. The album was produced by Thom Bell.

== History ==
The album reached #32 on the Billboard 200 and #3 on the R&B albums chart. It features the hit singles "Break Up to Make Up", "I'm Stone in Love with You", and "You'll Never Get to Heaven (If You Break My Heart)". All three singles reached the top-ten on the R&B charts. "Break Up to Make Up" and "I'm Stone in Love with You" also reached the top-ten on the Billboard Hot 100.

== Track listing ==
All tracks are written by Thom Bell and Linda Creed, except where noted.

Side one
| No. | Title | Writer(s) | Length |
|---|---|---|---|
| 1. | "I'm Stone in Love with You" | Thom Bell, Linda Creed, Anthony Bell | 3:19 |
| 2. | "If You Don't Watch Out" | | 2:34 |
| 3. | "You and Me" | | 2:43 |
| 4. | "It's Too Late" | Carole King, Toni Stern | 4:34 |
| 5. | "Children of the Night" | | 7:00 |

Side two
| No. | Title | Writer(s) | Length |
|---|---|---|---|
| 1. | "You'll Never Get to Heaven (If You Break My Heart)" | Burt Bacharach, Hal David | 3:38 |
| 2. | "Break Up to Make Up" | Thom Bell, Linda Creed, Kenneth Gamble | 4:00 |
| 3. | "Peek-a-Boo" | Gregory Guess, Norman Knox | 2:53 |
| 4. | "You're as Right as Rain" | | 3:46 |
| 5. | "Pieces" | | 3:09 |

== Personnel ==
- Russell Thompkins, Jr. – lead vocals
- Airrion Love, James Smith, Herb Murrell, James Dunn – backing vocals
- Linda Creed, Barbara Ingram – additional backing vocals
- Norman Harris, Roland Chambers, Tony Bell, Eli Tartarsky – guitar
- Ronnie Baker – bass
- Earl Young – drums
- Larry Washington – congas
- Vincent Montana Jr. – percussion
- Thom Bell – piano, harpsichord
- Joe DeAngelis, Stephanie Fauber, Robert Martin – French horn
- Rocco Bene, Bobby Hartzell – trumpet
- Jack Faith – alto saxophone, flute
- George Shaw – flute
- Vincent Forchetti, Bob Moore, Richard Genevese – trombone
- Don Renaldo, Tony Sinagoga, Albert Berone, Rudy Malizia, Angelo Pretrella, Romeo Di Stefano, Charles Apollonia, Davis Barnett, Richard Jones, Herschel Wise – strings
- Mary Gale – harp
- Fredric Cohen – oboe

== Charts ==
| Chart (1972) | Peak |
|---|---|
| U.S. Billboard Top LPs | 32 |
| U.S. Billboard Top Soul LPs | 3 |

Singles

| Year | Single | Peak chart position | | | |
| Year | Single | US | US R&B | US A/C | UK |
|---|---|---|---|---|---|
| 1972 | "I'm Stone in Love with You" | 10 | 4 | 27 | 9 |
| 1973 | "Break Up to Make Up" | 5 | 5 | 20 | 34 |
| 1973 | "You'll Never Get to Heaven (If You Break My Heart)" | 23 | 8 | 4 | — |
| 1973 | "Peek-A-Boo" | — | — | — | 35 |
