= Stylistics (disambiguation) =

Stylistics is the study of language and its context. Stylistics may also refer to:

- The Stylistics, a Philadelphia soul group
  - The Stylistics (album), a 1971 album by the group
