= Thank You Baby (The Stylistics album) =

Studio album by the Stylistics
- Released: May 15, 1975
- Studios: Mediasound, New York City
- Genres: R&B, Philadelphia soul
- Length: 34:59; 39:40 (selected international versions)
- Labels: Avco; AV 69008
- Producer: Hugo & Luigi

The Stylistics chronology
The Best of the Stylistics (1975)	Thank You Baby (1975)	You Are Beautiful (1975)

Singles from Thank You Baby
- 1. "Sing Baby Sing" Released: May 9, 1975; 2. "Thank You Baby" Released: June 1975; 3. "Disco Baby" Released: June 1975; 4. "Can't Give You Anything (But My Love)" Released: July 18, 1975; 5. "Tears And Souvenirs" Released: 1975

Thank You Baby is the sixth studio album recorded by Philadelphia soul group the Stylistics, released on May 15, 1975. It was produced by Hugo & Luigi and recorded at Mediasound Studios in New York City.

== Overview ==
The album continues the group's collaboration with producers Hugo & Luigi, lyricist George David Weiss, and arranger Van McCoy.

Avco issued the album with "Can't Give You Anything (But My Love)" (b/w "I'd Rather Be Hurt by You") in July 1975. The single reached No. 1 on the UK Singles Chart, No. 51 on Billboard Hot 100, No. 18 on the Billboard R&B chart.

In some international versions, the song "From The Mountain" from their previous studio album "Heavy" is slated in between Tracks 5 & 6." While Track 8 is placed after Track 2, and Track 3 is placed after Track 7.

== Track listing ==
All tracks are written by Hugo & Luigi and George David Weiss.

Side one
No.	Title	Length
1.	"Thank You Baby"	3:43
2.	"Can't Give You Anything (But My Love)"	3:13
3.	"What Goes Around Comes Around"	3:09
4.	"I'd Rather Be Hurt by You (Than Be Loved by Somebody Else)"	3:38
5.	"Disco Baby"	3:15

Side two
No.	Title	Length
6.	"Tears And Souvenirs"	4:07
7.	"A Honky Tonk Cafe"	3:30
8.	"I'm Gonna Win"	4:16
9.	"Stay"	3:04
10.	"Sing Baby Sing"	2:50

== Charts ==
Chart (1975)	Peak position
UK Albums Chart	5

== Certifications ==
Region	Certification	Certified units/sales
United Kingdom (BPI)	Gold	100,000^{^}
^{*} Sales figures based on certification alone.^{^} Shipments figures based on certification alone.

== Personnel ==
- Russell Thompkins Jr. – lead vocals
- Airrion Love – backing vocals, co-lead vocals on "Thank You Baby", "What Goes Around Comes Around" & "Stay"
- Herb Murrell – backing vocals, lead vocals on "Disco Baby"
- James Smith – backing vocals
- James Dunn – backing vocals
- Van McCoy – arranger, conductor
- Sounds engineered: Gilbert Kong & Michael DeLugg
