= The Stylistics (album) =

Studio album by The Stylistics
- Released: November 6, 1971
- Recorded: 1969 ("You're a Big Girl Now"); 1970–1971
- Studios: Sigma Sound, Philadelphia, Pennsylvania
- Genres: R&B, soul, Philadelphia soul
- Length: 29:24
- Label: Avco
- Producer: Thom Bell

The Stylistics chronology
The Stylistics (1971)	Round 2 (1972)

Singles from The Stylistics
- 1. "You're a Big Girl Now" Released: 1971; 2. "Stop, Look, Listen (to Your Heart)" Released: March 4, 1971; 3. "You Are Everything" Released: May 13, 1971; 4. "Betcha by Golly, Wow" Released: February 17, 1972; 5. "People Make the World Go Round" Released: 1972

Professional ratings
Review scores
Source	Rating
Allmusic	4.5/5 stars
BBC	(favorable)
Christgau's Record Guide	A−
Tom Hull – on the Web	A−

The Stylistics is the debut album by American R&B group the Stylistics, released in November 1971 on the Avco record label. It was produced by Thom Bell and recorded at Sigma Sound Studios in Philadelphia. The album has been called "a sweet soul landmark."

Group members Airrion Love, Herb Murrell, James Dunn, and James Smith can be heard on "You're a Big Girl Now," recorded and released as a single prior to the beginning of production on the album, but according to lead singer Russell Thompkins Jr., they're absent from the album's other eight songs aside from Love's harmony vocals on "You Are Everything." In John A. Jackson's book A House on Fire: The Rise and Fall of Philadelphia Soul (2004), Sigma Sound Studios founder and engineer Joe Tarsia says, "I don't care if it was the Stylistics or Harold Melvin and the Blue Notes, or whoever. All the backgrounds on all those songs were sung not by the groups, but by either Kenny Gamble, Leon Huff, Thom Bell, Carl Helm [or] Bunny Sigler," while Sigler says that "most" of the male background vocals on the Stylistics' hit songs were provided by himself, Gamble, Bell and Helm.

== History ==
The Stylistics reached No. 23 on the Billboard 200 and #3 on Billboard's R&B albums chart. It features the hit singles "Betcha by Golly, Wow," "You Are Everything," "People Make the World Go Round," "Stop, Look, Listen (to Your Heart)," and "You're a Big Girl Now." All five singles reached the top ten on the R&B chart, beginning a stretch of 12 top-ten hits in a row. "Betcha by Golly, Wow" and "You Are Everything" also reached the top ten on the Billboard Hot 100.

== Track listing ==
All tracks are written by Thom Bell and Linda Creed, except where noted.

Side one
No.	Title	Writer(s)	Length
1.	"Stop, Look, Listen (to Your Heart)"		2:54
2.	"Point of No Return"		2:45
3.	"Betcha by Golly, Wow"		3:47
4.	"Country Living"		2:57
5.	"You're a Big Girl Now"	Marty Bryant, Robert Douglas	3:14

Side two
No.	Title	Length
6.	"You Are Everything"	2:55
7.	"People Make the World Go Round"	6:26
8.	"Ebony Eyes"	2:21
9.	"If I Love You"	2:05

== Personnel ==
- Russell Thompkins Jr. – lead and backing vocals
- Linda Creed, Barbara Ingram – additional background vocals
- Norman Harris, Roland Chambers – guitar
- Ronnie Baker – bass
- Earl Young – drums
- Larry Washington – congas
- Vincent Montana Jr. – percussion
- Lenny Pakula – piano, organ
- Joe DeAngelis, Stephanie Fauber, Robert Martin – French horn
- Rocco Bene, Bobby Hartzell – trumpet
- Jack Faith – alto saxophone, flute
- George Shaw – flute
- Vincent Forchetti, Bob Moore, Richard Genevese – trombone
- Don Renaldo, Tony Sinagoga, Albert Berone, Rudy Malizia, Angelo Pretrella, Romeo Di Stefano, Charles Apollonia, Davis Barnett, Richard Jones, Herschel Wise – strings
- Mary Gale – harp
- Fredric Cohen – oboe

== Charts ==
Chart (1971/72)	Peak
Australia (Kent Music Report)	23
U.S. Billboard Top LPs	23
U.S. Billboard Top Soul LPs	3

Singles

Year	Single	Peak chart positions			
Year	Single	US	US R&B	US A/C	UK
1971	"You're a Big Girl Now"	73	7	—	—
1971	"Stop, Look, Listen (To Your Heart)"	39	6	—	—
1971	"You Are Everything"	9	10	24	—
1972	"Betcha by Golly, Wow"	3	2	7	13
1972	"People Make the World Go Round"	25	6	25	—
