= Russell Thompkins Jr. =

American soul singer (born 1951)

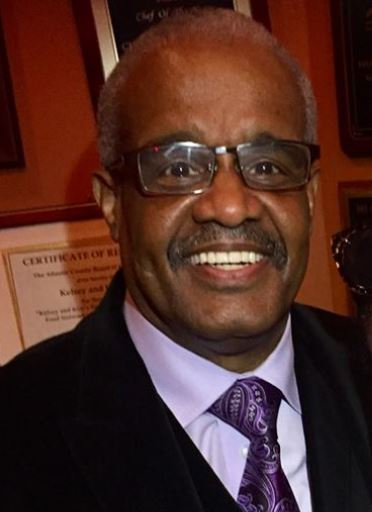
- Russell in Atlantic City in 2018

Background information
- Born: Russell Allen Thompkins Jr. March 21, 1951 (age 75); Philadelphia, Pennsylvania, U.S.
- Genres: Philadelphia soul, R&B, Pop, Disco, Jazz
- Occupation: Singer
- Years active: 1968–present
- Member of: The New Stylistics Featuring Russell Thompkins Jr.
- Formerly of: The Stylistics
- Website: russellthompkinsjr.com

Russell Allen Thompkins Jr. (born March 21, 1951) is an American Philadelphia soul singer, best known as the original lead singer of the vocal group The Stylistics and noted for his high tenor, countertenor, and falsetto vocals. With Russell as lead singer, The Stylistics had 12 straight Top 10 Billboard R&B singles, and 5 gold singles from 1971 through 1974.

== Early years ==
Born in Philadelphia, Thompkins was introduced to music by his father and started singing formally in school. During high school, Thompkins was a member of a local vocal group called the Monarchs who defeated another group called the Percussions in a talent show at Benjamin Franklin High School. Both groups disbanded shortly thereafter. Their remaining members, Thompkins, James Smith, and Airrion Love from The Monarchs, and James Dunn and Herbie Murrell from the Percussions, joined to form a new group called The Stylistics in 1968.

== Career ==
In 1970, the Stylistics recorded "You're a Big Girl Now", which soon became a regional hit for Sebring Records. The larger Avco Records soon signed the Stylistics, and the single eventually climbed to number seven on the R&B charts in early 1971. Avco approached record producer Thom Bell to work with the group. After the Stylistics auditioned for Bell he was unimpressed, but he ultimately agreed to produce them, because he believed in the potential of Thompkins's soaring high tenor voice. Thom Bell focused the group's sound completely around Thompkins's voice. On most of the group's hits, Bell would have Thompkins sing virtually solo.

From 1971 to 1974, the Stylistics had twelve consecutive U.S. R&B top ten hits and five top ten U.S. pop hits, including "Stop, Look, Listen (To Your Heart)", "You Are Everything", "Betcha by Golly, Wow", "Break Up to Make Up", and "You Make Me Feel Brand New". All of these songs (and most of the material the group recorded) were led by Thompkins, with the exception of "You're a Big Girl Now", written and composed by Thom Bell and lyricist Linda Creed. 1974's "You Make Me Feel Brand New", a No. 2 pop hit, was lead sung by group member Airrion Love.

Thom Bell stopped working with the group in 1974, and the split proved commercially devastating to the group's success in the U.S. However, in 1975, the Stylistics did release one single which was commercially successful as an early disco track entitled, "Hey, Girl, Come and Get It". After 1976, the Stylistics general commercial decline was more pronounced, and they would only sporadically make the R&B charts in the next two decades. However, just as U.S. success began to wane, their popularity in Europe, and especially the United Kingdom, increased. The lighter "pop" sound fashioned by Van McCoy and Hugo & Luigi gave the band a UK No. 1 in 1975 with "Can't Give You Anything (But My Love)".

In 2000, Thompkins left the group saying he regretted that he had not left much earlier. After his split from the group, Thompkins studied music formally and learned to play the piano.

In 2002, he released a solo album entitled A Matter of Style, which included cover versions of George and Ira Gershwin's "Embraceable You" and the Thom Bell and Linda Creed song "Jealousy", originally recorded by Dionne Warwick.

In 2004, Thompkins started a new group, The New Stylistics Featuring Russell Thompkins Jr., with Raymond Johnson, James Ranton, and Jonathan Buckson. They continued to tour and were featured on the DVD Old School Soul Party Live!, which was part of the PBS My Music series. James Ranton left the group for health reasons but the group continued as a trio.

In 2007, Thompkins along with Ted Mills (original lead singer of Blue Magic) and William Hart (original lead singer of The Delfonics) teamed up to record an album entitled, All The Way From Philadelphia, under the name The 3 Tenors of Soul, on Shanachie Records.

As of 2026, The New Stylistics Featuring Russell Thompkins Jr. were still performing and touring.

In 2023, Rolling Stone ranked Thompkins at number 142 on its list of the 200 Greatest Singers of All Time.

== Discography ==
=== With The Stylistics ===
Further information: The Stylistics discography

=== Other projects ===
- Russell Thompkins Jr.: Matter of Style - 2002 (album)
- The 3 Tenors Of Soul: All The Way From Philadelphia - 2007 (album)
- Russel Thompkins Jr.: Between Love Songs - 2018 (album)
- Russel Thompkins Jr.: The Lost Love Songs - 2025 (album) Recorded 1997
