= Rockin' Roll Baby (song) =

Single by The Stylistics

from the album Rockin' Roll Baby
- B-side: "Pieces"
- Released: October 1973
- Genre: Soul
- Length: 4:31 (album version); 3:17 (single edit)
- Label: Avco
- Songwriters: Linda Creed, Thom Bell
- Producer: Thom Bell

The Stylistics singles chronology
"You'll Never Get to Heaven (If You Break My Heart)" (1973)	"Rockin' Roll Baby" (1973)	"You Make Me Feel Brand New" (1974)

Official audio
- "Rockin' Roll Baby" on YouTube

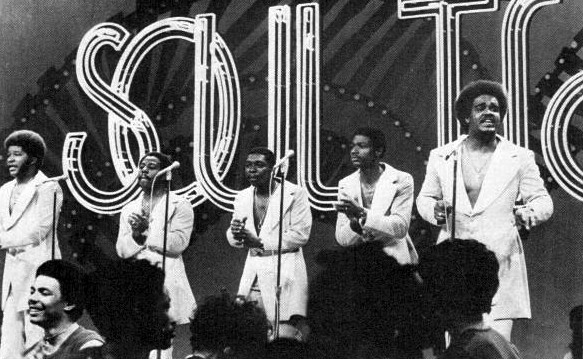
The Stylistics performing on Soul Train in 1974

"Rockin' Roll Baby" is a song written by Linda Creed and Thom Bell and performed by The Stylistics. It reached No. 3 on the U.S. R&B chart, No. 6 on the UK Singles Chart, No. 14 on the U.S. pop chart, No. 44 on the U.S. adult contemporary chart, and No. 57 on the Canadian pop chart in 1974. It was featured as the title song from their 1973 eponymous album.

The song was arranged and produced by Thom Bell. Lead vocals are by Russell Thompkins Jr.

The song ranked No. 96 on Billboard magazine's Top 100 singles of 1974.

== Lyrical content ==
The narrator, a hard-working touring musician, describes his infant son, a child prodigy, who was "born in a theater in Bluefield, West Virginia". Although only a toddler, "Little Joey" has great singing talent and has a "funky walk in his little orthopedic shoes." The musician is successful and buys a house in Beverly Hills, attributing his success to the child.

== Other versions ==
- The Fleshtones released a version of the song on their 1999 album Hitsburg Revisited.
