= Don't Knock My Love =

1971 song performed by Wilson Pickett

"Don't Knock My Love - Pt. 1"

Single by Wilson Pickett

from the album Don't Knock My Love
- B-side: "Don't Knock My Love - Pt. 2"
- Released: April 1971
- Genre: Funk , Soul, R&B
- Length: 2:13
- Label: Atlantic
- Songwriters: Wilson Pickett, Brad Shapiro
- Producer: Wilson Pickett

Wilson Pickett singles chronology
"Don't Let the Green Grass Fool You" (1971)	"Don't Knock My Love - Pt. 1" (1971)	"Call My Name, I'll Be There" (1971)

"Don't Knock My Love" is a hit song performed by R&B singer Wilson Pickett and written by Pickett with Brad Shapiro. Released in the spring of 1971 from the album of the same title, it spent a week at number-one on the Billboard Best Selling Soul Singles Chart and peaked at #13 on the Billboard Hot 100 Singles Chart. The song, which was produced under a funk tempo was Pickett's last number-one single and one of his last hits for Atlantic Records.

== Personnel ==
- Lead vocals by Wilson Pickett
- Instrumentation by assorted musicians
  - Bass by David Hood
  - Congas by Eddie Brown
  - Drums by Roger Hawkins
  - Guitar by Dennis Coffey and Tippy Armstrong
  - Keyboards by Barry Beckett and Dave Crawford
  - Percussion by Jack Ashford
  - Tenor saxophone by Andrew Love
  - Trumpet by Wayne Jackson
- Produced by Wilson Pickett
- Arranged by Wade Marcus

== Certifications ==
Certifications for "Don't Knock My Love"
Region	Certification	Certified units/sales
United States (RIAA)	Gold	1,000,000^{^}
^{^} Shipments figures based on certification alone.

== Marvin Gaye and Diana Ross version ==
"Don't Knock My Love"

Single by Diana Ross & Marvin Gaye

from the album Diana & Marvin
- B-side: "Just Say, Just Say"
- Released: June 18, 1974
- Recorded: 1971
- Genre: Soul
- Length: 2:13
- Label: Motown
- Songwriters: Wilson Pickett, Brad Shapiro
- Producer: Hal Davis

Diana Ross & Marvin Gaye singles chronology
"You Are Everything" (1974)	"Don't Knock My Love" (1974)	"Stop, Look, Listen (To Your Heart)" (1974)

Marvin Gaye singles chronology
"You Are Everything" (1974)	"Don't Knock My Love" (1974)	"Stop, Look, Listen (To Your Heart)" (1974)

Diana Ross singles chronology
"Sleepin'" (1974)	"Don't Knock My Love" (1974)	"Stop, Look, Listen (To Your Heart)" (1974)

A cover version of the song was recorded by Diana Ross and Marvin Gaye for their 1973 duet album, Diana & Marvin. It peaked at #46 on the Billboard Hot 100 Singles Chart and #25 on the Hot Soul Singles Chart. Outrside the US, the duo had a #1 hit in Brazil with their cover.

=== Personnel ===
- Lead vocals by Marvin Gaye and Diana Ross
- Background vocals by assorted singers
- Instrumentation by The Funk Brothers
- Produced by Hal Davis
