= You're a Special Part of Me =

Single by Diana Ross & Marvin Gaye

from the album Diana & Marvin
- B-side: "I'm Falling in Love With You"
- Released: September 1973
- Recorded: 1972
- Genre: Soul
- Length: 3:35 (LP version); 3:24 (single version)
- Label: Motown
- Songwriters: Harold Johnson; Andrew Porter; Greg Wright
- Producer: Berry Gordy

Diana Ross & Marvin Gaye singles chronology
"You're a Special Part of Me" (1973)	"My Mistake (Was to Love You)" (1974)

Marvin Gaye singles chronology
"Let's Get It On" (1973)	"You're a Special Part of Me" (1973)	"Come Get to This" (1973)

Diana Ross singles chronology
"Touch Me in the Morning" (1973)	"You're a Special Part of Me" (1973)	"Last Time I Saw Him" (1973)

"You're a Special Part of Me" was a successful duet single for soul singers and Motown label mates Diana Ross & Marvin Gaye, released in 1973. The original duet was one of the few originals featured on their famed album, Diana & Marvin, and was among the most successful of the songs the Motown label mates made reaching #4 on the Billboard R&B Singles chart and #12 on the Billboard Pop Singles chart.

Record World said that "the combination [of Ross and Gaye] is beautiful.

== Remixes ==
There are several mixes of this song which have been released: the single mix, the album mix, the Japanese Quadraphonic album mix, and an alternate mix released in 1995 on the "Motown Year By Year: 1973" CD, which clocks in at 4:29.

== Personnel ==
- Lead vocals by Marvin Gaye and Diana Ross
- Background vocals by The Devastating Affair
- Instrumentation by The Funk Brothers

== Chart performance ==
Chart (1973)	Peak position
US Billboard Easy Listening	43
US Hot R&B/Hip-Hop Songs (Billboard)	4
US Billboard Hot 100	12
