= I'm Stone in Love with You =

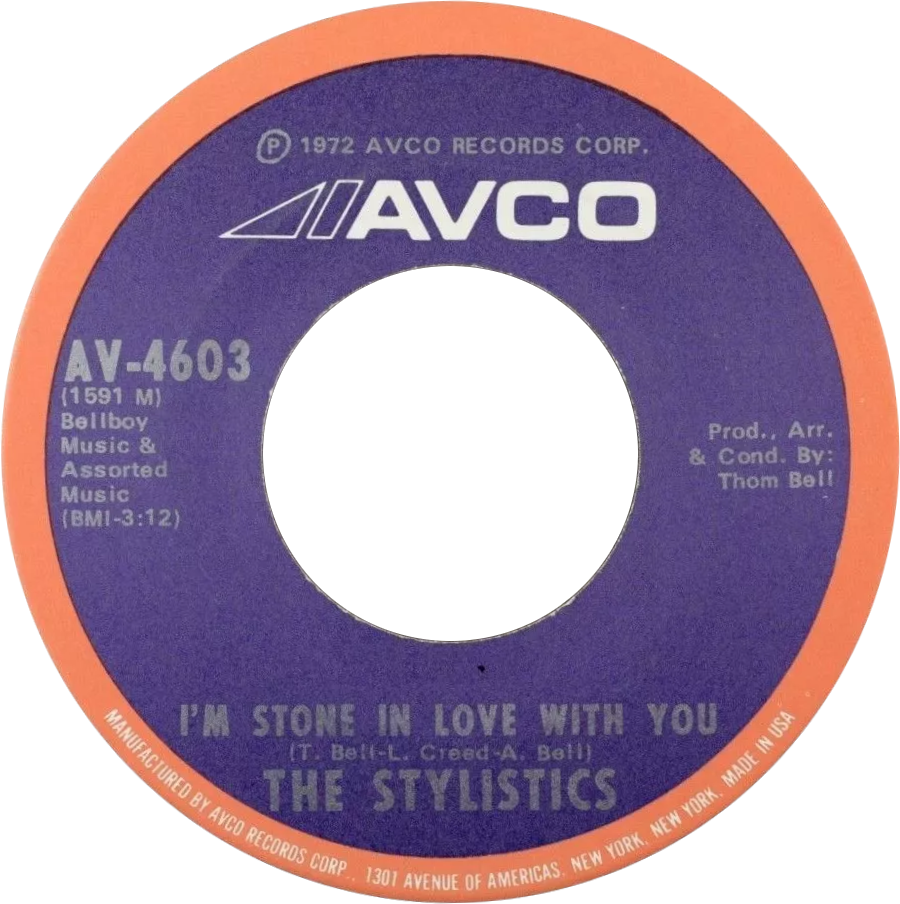
- One of side-A labels of the US single

Single by The Stylistics

from the album Round 2
- B-side: "Make It Last"
- Released: October 1972
- Genre: Soul, Philly soul
- Length: 3:19
- Label: Avco
- Songwriters: Thom Bell, Linda Creed, Anthony Bell
- Producer: Thom Bell

The Stylistics singles chronology
"People Make the World Go Round" (1972)	"I'm Stone in Love with You" (1972)	"Break Up to Make Up" (1973)

"I'm Stone in Love with You" is a 1972 single by the Philadelphia soul group The Stylistics. The song is noted for lead singer Russell Thompkins Jr.'s distinctive falsetto singing, which he employs through most of the record. The song was written by Thom Bell, Linda Creed, and Anthony Bell.

It was the first track from the band's 1972 album Round 2 and was released as a single which reached number 10 on the US Billboard Hot 100. It also climbed to number 4 in the Billboard R&B chart and went to number 9 in the UK Singles Chart, in December 1972. The Stylistics' recording sold over one million copies globally, earning them a gold disc The award was presented by the RIAA on December 13, 1972. It was the band's third gold disc.

== Chart performance ==
=== Weekly charts ===
Weekly charts for The Stylistics version
Chart (1972–73)	Peak position
Australia	92
Canada RPM Top Singles	8
France	9
New Zealand (Listener)	10
UK	9
US Billboard Hot 100	10
US Billboard Adult Contemporary	27
US Billboard R&B	4
US Cash Box Top 100	9

=== Year-end charts ===
Year-end charts for The Stylistics version
Chart (1972)	Rank
US (Joel Whitburn's Pop Annual)	96

== Johnny Mathis version ==
Johnny Mathis recorded the song in 1973. His version became a 1975 hit on the Adult Contemporary charts, reaching number five in Canada and number 16 U.S. In the UK, the version started its twelve-week run on January 25, 1975, and made it to number ten.

Weekly charts for the Johnny Mathis version
Chart (1975)	Peak position
Canada RPM Adult Contemporary	5
Ireland (IRMA)	8
UK Singles (OCC)	10
US Billboard Adult Contemporary	16

== The Beautiful South version ==
English pop group The Beautiful South covered the song for their 2004 album Golddiggas, Headnodders and Pholk Songs.
