= Spinner (surname) =

Spinner is a surname. In English and German, the surname is derived from the profession of spinning. Notable people with the surname include:

- Bryson Spinner (born 1980), American football quarterback
- Francis E. Spinner (1802–1890), U.S. Representative from New York
- Jackie Spinner (born 1970), American journalist
- Leopold Spinner (1906–1980), Ukrainian-born, British-domiciled composer and editor
- Noah Spinner, American politician
- Sonja Stettler Spinner (born 1969), Swiss footballer
- Steve Spinner (born 1969), American business executive
- Tony Spinner (born 1963), American rock and blues singer and guitarist

== See also ==
- Spinner (disambiguation)
