= Live at Caesars Palace =

Live album by Diana Ross
- Released: May 1974
- Recorded: February 1973
- Venues: Caesars Palace (Las Vegas, Nevada)
- Genres: Soul; pop
- Length: 46:13
- Label: Motown

Diana Ross chronology
Last Time I Saw Him (1973)	Live at Caesars Palace (1974)	Diana Ross (1976)

Professional ratings
Review scores
Source	Rating
AllMusic	3/5 stars
The Encyclopedia of Popular Music	3/5 stars
The Rolling Stone Album Guide	3/5 stars

Live at Caesars Palace is a live album by the American singer Diana Ross, released in 1974. It was recorded during a 1973 performance at Las Vegas' Caesars Palace. It was the first of two live albums Ross recorded for Motown. It reached No. 64 in the USA (No. 15 R&B).

== Critical reception ==
AllMusic wrote that "the staged conversations, often awkward monologues, and rough pacing were balanced by some excellent performances, and the album was produced well enough to keep her voice at the core of the sound."

== Track listing ==
Side A:

1. "Overture" - 0:49
2. "Don't Rain on My Parade" [from Funny Girl] (Jule Styne, Bob Merrill) - 2:21
3. "Big Mable Murphy" (Dallas Frazier) - 3:02
4. "Reach Out and Touch (Somebody's Hand)" (Nickolas Ashford, Valerie Simpson) - 6:57
5. "The Supremes Medley: Stop! In the Name of Love / My World Is Empty Without You / Baby Love /I Hear a Symphony" (Lamont Dozier, Eddie Holland, Brian Holland) - 5:19
6. "Ain't No Mountain High Enough" (Nickolas Ashford, Valerie Simpson) - 4:57

Side B:

1. "Corner of the Sky" [from Pippin] (Stephen Schwartz) - 4:04
2. "Bein' Green" (Joe Raposo) - 2:49
3. "I Loves You, Porgy" (George Gershwin, Ira Gershwin, DuBose Heyward) - 1:37
4. "Lady Sings the Blues Medley: Lady Sings the Blues / God Bless the Child / Good Morning Heartache / 'Tain't Nobody's Biz-ness if I Do" (Billie Holiday, Ervin Drake, Porter Grainger, Arthur Herzog Jr., Dan Fisher, Irene Higginbotham) - 7:24
5. "The Lady Is a Tramp" (Richard Rodgers, Lorenz Hart) - 2:29
6. "My Man" (Channing Pollock) - 4:25

== Personnel ==
- Diana Ross - vocals
- Gil Askey - arranger, conductor
- Marty Harris - piano
- Gene Pello - drums
- Greg Poree - guitar
- Jerry Steinholtz - percussion, conga
- Nat Brandwynne and His Orchestra
- Devastating Affair - background vocals
- Orlando "Papito" Hernandez - bass

Technical

- Armin Steiner - recording engineer
- John E. Mills, Ralph Lotten - remix engineers
- Bill "The Blade" Lazerus - engineer
- David Larkham, Ed Caraeff, Michael Ross - art direction, package concept
- Ed Caraeff - photography

== The Devastating Affair ==
The Devastating Affair
- Genres: R&B, soul
- Years active: 1970–1975
- Labels: Motown; MoWest
- Past members: Andrew Porter; Greg Wright; Harold Johnson; Karin Patterson; Olivia Foster

The Devastating Affair, consisting of Andrew Porter, Greg Wright, Harold Johnson, Karin Patterson, and Olivia Foster, were an American quintet of soul vocalists signed to MoWest that evolved into a Motown travelling opening and backing vocalist act for Diana Ross.

Heralded as the first in a "new generation of hugely promising soul acts" from the Los Angeles-headquartered Motown subsidiary label MoWest Records, Motown launched their MoWest imprint with their debut single "I Want To Be Humble", a crossover-soul record that has become a sought-after collector's item. Both albums the group recorded (the first, Devastating Affair Mountain (1972) on MoWest, and then a second album, titled The Devastating Affair (1973) on Motown) were unfortunately shelved. The group performed backing vocals on Ross & Marvin Gaye's hit single "You're a Special Part of Me" from the 1973 album Diana & Marvin, after the 3 male members of the group co-wrote the single and submitted the demo for inclusion, as well as Ross's 1970 album Everything Is Everything.

During their tenure as a group, three singles were released: "I Want To Be Humble/My Place" (1971 - MoWest), "That's How It Was (Right From The Start)" (1973 - MoWest), and "You Don't Know (How Hard It Is To Make It)" (1974 - Motown).

== Charts ==
Chart (1974)	Peak position
Australia (Kent Music Report)	92
Canada Top Albums/CDs (RPM)	40
UK Albums (Official Charts)	21
US Billboard 200	64
US Top R&B/Hip-Hop Albums (Billboard)	15
