= Stop, Look, Listen (To Your Heart) =

1971 song first recorded by The Stylistics

"Stop, Look, Listen (to Your Heart)"
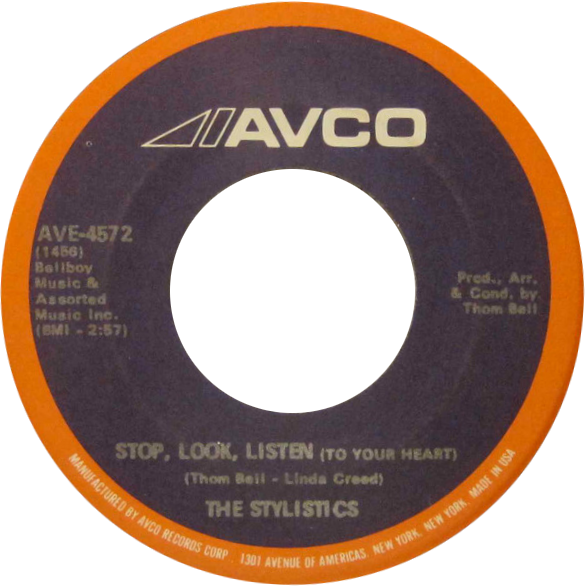
- One of side-A labels of the US single

Single by the Stylistics

from the album The Stylistics
- B-side: "If I Love You"
- Released: March 4, 1971
- Studio: Sigma Sound, Philadelphia, Pennsylvania
- Genre: Soul; Philly soul
- Length: 2:57
- Label: Avco
- Songwriters: Thom Bell; Linda Creed
- Producer: Thom Bell

The Stylistics singles chronology
"You're a Big Girl Now" (1971)	"Stop, Look, Listen (to Your Heart)" (1971)	"You Are Everything" (1971)

"Stop, Look, Listen (to Your Heart)" is a soul song written by Thom Bell and Linda Creed originally recorded by Philadelphia soul group the Stylistics.

== The Stylistics original version ==
An R&B ballad, it was the first track from their debut self-titled album and was released as a single in 1971, reaching No. 39 on the U.S. Billboard Hot 100 chart and No. 6 on the Billboard R&B chart.

=== Personnel ===
- Lead vocals by Russell Thompkins Jr.
- Background vocals by Thom Bell, Carl Helm, Bunny Sigler, Kenny Gamble, and Phil Hurtt
- Produced by Thom Bell

== Diana Ross and Marvin Gaye version ==
"Stop, Look, Listen (to Your Heart)"
- Solid center variant of the UK single

Single by Diana Ross and Marvin Gaye

from the album Diana & Marvin
- B-side: "Love Twins"
- Released: May 5, 1974
- Genre: Soul
- Length: 2:53
- Label: Motown
- Songwriters: Thom Bell, Linda Creed
- Producer: Hal Davis

Diana Ross and Marvin Gaye singles chronology
"Don't Knock My Love" (1974)	"Stop, Look, Listen (to Your Heart)" (1974)

Marvin Gaye singles chronology
"Don't Knock My Love" (1974)	"Stop, Look, Listen (To Your Heart)" (1974)	"Distant Lover (live)" (1974)

Diana Ross singles chronology
"Don't Knock My Love" (1974)	"Stop, Look, Listen (To Your Heart)" (1974)	"Love Me" (1974)

Around the same time, Motown wanted their most successful label mates Diana Ross and Marvin Gaye to record a duet album. Among the songs they released, their version of "Stop, Look, Listen (To Your Heart)" was recorded in separate studios, and was released as a UK-only single from their duet album Diana & Marvin, in 1974. The song became a hit in the UK, reaching No. 25 on the UK Singles Chart.

In 2001, the Diana Ross and Marvin Gaye duet version was included on the soundtrack to the film Bridget Jones's Diary.

=== Personnel ===
- Lead vocals by Diana Ross and Marvin Gaye
- Instrumentation by the Funk Brothers
- Produced by Hal Davis
