= My Mistake (Was to Love You) =

Single by Diana Ross & Marvin Gaye

from the album Diana & Marvin
- B-side: "Include Me in Your Life"
- Released: January 1974
- Recorded: 1973
- Genre: Soul
- Length: 2:55
- Label: Motown
- Songwriters: Gloria Jones; Pam Sawyer
- Producer: Hal Davis

Diana Ross & Marvin Gaye singles chronology
"You're a Special Part of Me" (1973)	"My Mistake (Was to Love You)" (1974)	"You Are Everything" (1974)

Marvin Gaye singles chronology
"You Sure Love to Ball" (1974)	"My Mistake (Was to Love You)" (1974)	"You Are Everything" (1974)

Diana Ross singles chronology
"Last Time I Saw Him" (1973)	"My Mistake (Was to Love You)" (1973)	"You Are Everything" (1974)

"My Mistake (Was to Love You)" is a song recorded as a duet by Diana Ross and Marvin Gaye which was the second single released off the singers' duet album Diana & Marvin in February 1974. One of the original songs featured on that album, "My Mistake (Was to Love You)" was written by Gloria Jones and Pam Sawyer, the team responsible for the Gladys Knight & the Pips' classic "If I Were Your Woman". Pam Sawyer was also the co-writer (with Michael Masser) of the Diana Ross hit "Last Time I Saw Him" which dropped out of the Top 40 just prior to the Top 40 debut of "My Mistake (Was to Love You)" in March 1974: Sawyer would subsequently co-write (with Marilyn Mcleod) Diana Ross' 1976 #1 hit "Love Hangover". "My Mistake" peaked at #15 on the Billboard R&B singles chart and #19 on the Billboard Pop singles chart. It reached #16 in Canada.

== Background ==
The narrative of "My Mistake (Was to Love You)" outlines how two lovers' relationship fell apart because the man, according to the woman, felt as if "a girl loves you, you only call them weak", while the man admits that he let his lover "slip through, like grains of sand".

== Personnel ==
- All vocals by Marvin Gaye & Diana Ross
- Instrumentation by The Funk Brothers
- Produced by Hal Davis

== Chart performance ==
Chart (1974)	Peak position
Canada	16
US Billboard Hot 100	19
US Billboard Hot Soul Singles	15
