= Spinner =

Spinner may refer to:

== Technology ==
- Spinner (aeronautics), the aerodynamic cone at the hub of an aircraft propeller
- Spinner (cell culture), laboratory equipment for cultivating plant or mammalian cells
- Spinner (computing), a graphical widget in a GUI
- Spinner (MIT Media Lab), software that can automatically edit video to fit a narrative structure

== Arts and entertainment ==
- Spinner (album), a 1995 album by Brian Eno & Jah Wobble
- Spinner (Blade Runner), a flying car from the film Blade Runner

== People ==
- Spinner (surname)
- Brian Spencer (1949–1988), Canadian National Hockey League player nicknamed "Spinner"

== Fictional characters ==
- Spinner (My Hero Academia), a character in the manga series My Hero Academia
- Spinner Mason, in the TV series Degrassi: The Next Generation
- Spinner, in the animated TV series Clutch Cargo
- Dorothy Spinner, a DC Comics character.
- Spinner, a villain of Batman from DC Comics

== Sports and games ==
- Spinner (dominoes), a domino tile that may be played on four ways
- a spin bowler in cricket
- a style of delivery in Ten-pin bowling
- Fidget spinner, a stress relieving toy
- Teetotum, a form of spinning top most commonly used for gambling games

== Other uses ==
- a person who spins textiles
- a person who engages in article spinning
- Spinnerbait, a type of fishing lure
- Spinner (website), a music website owned by AOL
- Spinner (wheel), an accessory that goes on an automobile wheel and spins independently
- Spinner, a locomotive of the former Midland Railway 115 Class in the UK
- a machine used to do spin coating in manufacturing
- a wind spinner or whirligig

== See also ==
- Spinner dolphin, a dolphin species
- Spinner shark, a shark species
- Spinor (mathematics)
- Spinners (disambiguation)
- Bamboo-copter, a spinner toy
