= People Make the World Go Round =

1972 single by The Stylistics

Single by The Stylistics

from the album The Stylistics
- B-side: "Point of No Return"
- Released: 1971
- Recorded: 1971
- Studio: Sigma Sound, Philadelphia, Pennsylvania
- Genre: Philadelphia soul
- Length: 6:26 (album version); 3:28 (single version)
- Label: Avco; AV-4595
- Songwriters: Thom Bell; Linda Creed
- Producer: Thom Bell

The Stylistics singles chronology
"Betcha by Golly, Wow" (1972)	"People Make the World Go Round" (1971)	"I'm Stone in Love with You" (1972)

"People Make the World Go Round" is a song written by Thom Bell and Linda Creed, originally recorded by The Stylistics and released in 1972 through Avco Records as the final single from their self-titled debut studio album, The Stylistics (1971). It reached No. 25 on the Billboard Hot 100 singles chart, No. 25 on the Adult Contemporary chart, and No. 6 on the Soul Singles chart in the United States.

== Track listing ==
All tracks are written by Thom Bell and Linda Creed.

"People Make the World Go Round" 7-inch vinyl
No.	Title	Length
1.	"People Make the World Go Round"	3:28
2.	"Point of No Return"	2:44

== Charts ==
Chart (1972)	Peak position
US Billboard Hot 100	25
US Adult Contemporary (Billboard)	25
US Hot R&B/Hip-Hop Songs (Billboard)	6

== Marc Dorsey version ==
"People Make the World Go Round"

Single by Marc Dorsey

from the album Music from the Motion Picture Soundtrack Crooklyn - A Spike Lee Joint! Volume 1
- Released: May 10, 1994
- Recorded: 1994
- Genre: Rhythm and blues
- Length: 5:05
- Label: MCA
- Songwriters: Thom Bell; Linda Creed
- Producers: Spike Lee (exec.); Narada Michael Walden

Marc Dorsey singles chronology
"People Make the World Go Round" (1994)	"If You Really Wanna Know" (1999)

American R&B artist Marc Dorsey recorded his take on the song specifically for Spike Lee's 1994 film Crooklyn - A Spike Lee Joint!. It was produced by Narada Michael Walden and released as a promotional single on May 10, 1994, by MCA Records. It peaked at No. 65 on the Hot R&B/Hip-Hop Songs chart and at No. 66 on the R&B/Hip-Hop Airplay chart in the United States. Both the Stylistics' and Marc Dorsey's versions were featured in the film, as well as in its soundtrack album.

=== Track listing ===
All tracks are written by Thom Bell and Linda Creed.

"People Make the World Go Round"
No.	Title	Length
1.	"People Make the World Go Round" (Single Edit)	4:36
2.	"People Make the World Go Round" (Album Version)	5:05
3.	"People Make the World Go Round" (Instrumental)	5:05

=== Charts ===
Chart (1994)	Peak position
US Hot R&B/Hip-Hop Songs (Billboard)	65
US R&B/Hip-Hop Airplay (Billboard)	66

== Michael Jackson version ==
"People Make the World Go Round"

Song by Michael Jackson

from the album Ben
- Released: August 4, 1972
- Length: 3:15
- Label: Motown
- Songwriters: Thom Bell; Linda Creed

Michael Jackson recorded a version of the song for his second solo album, Ben, released on August 4, 1972. His recording featured new verses written by Thom Bell and Linda Creed.

== Richard Elliot version ==
"People Make the World Go Round"

Song by Richard Elliot

from the album Metro Blue
- Released: 2005
- Studio: Brauntosoarus Studio
- Genre: Smooth jazz
- Length: 4:25
- Label: ARTizen Music Group
- Songwriters: Thom Bell; Linda Creed
- Producers: Richard Elliot; Rick Braun

Scottish-born American saxophonist Richard Elliot recorded a smooth jazz rendition which was featured in his 2005 studio album Metro Blue, released via ARTizen Music Group. Produced by Elliot and Rick Braun, the song reached No. 5 on the Smooth Jazz Songs chart in the United States.

=== Charts ===
Chart (2005)	Peak position
US Smooth Jazz Airplay (Billboard)	5

== Angela Bofill version ==
This song was on the 1979 Angel of the Night album.

"People Make the World Go Round"

Song by Angela Bofill

from the album Angel of the Night
- Released: 1979
- Studio: A&R Studios New York City
- Genre: Soul
- Length: 4:32
- Label: Arista Records LLC
- Songwriters: Thom Bell; Linda Creed
- Producers: Dave Grusin; Larry Rosen

== Jamaica Boys version ==
"People Make the World Go Round"

Song by Jamaica Boys

from the album Jamaica Boys
- Released: 1987
- Studio: Minot Sound, Quadrasonic Sound, N.Y., 39th Street Music Studio N.Y., Rawlston Recording, Brooklyn, N.Y.
- Genre: Dub
- Length: 5:40
- Label: Warner Records
- Songwriters: Thom Bell; Linda Creed
- Producers: Marcus Miller; Lenny White; Ray Bardani

The dub cover of this song was included on the 1987 self-titled album by Jamaica Boys, a short-lived band created by vocalist Marc Stevens, jazz bass player Marcus Miller and jazz drummer Lenny White

== Sampled credits ==
The song was sampled by several hip hop recording artists, including:

- Naughty by Nature in "World Go Round" from Poverty's Paradise (1995)
- Westside Connection in "Gangstas Make the World Go Round" from Bow Down (1996)
- Scarface in "Money Makes the World Go 'Round" from The Untouchable (1997)
- Rick Ross in "I Think She Like Me" from Rather You Than Me (2017)
- Snoop Dogg and Dr. Dre in "Fore Play" from Missionary (2024)
