= You Make Me Feel Brand New =

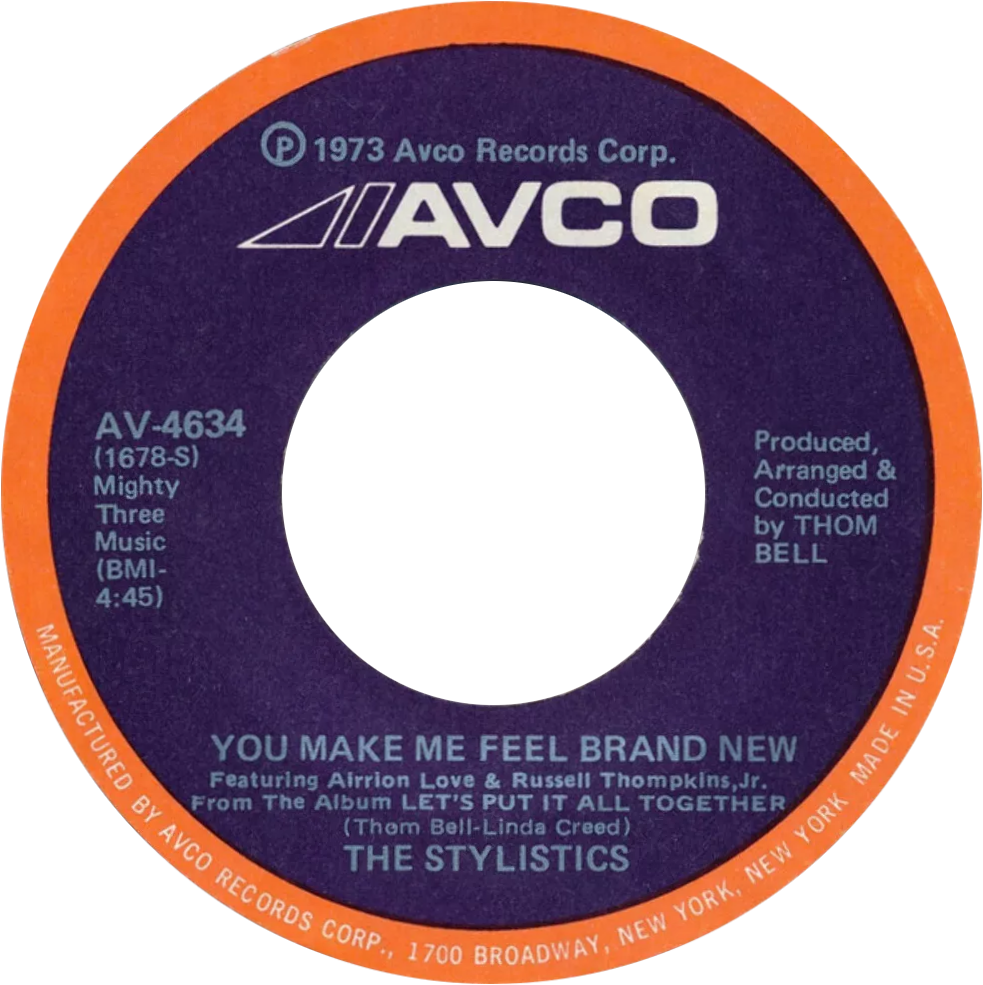
- One of pressings of the US single

Single by The Stylistics

from the album Rockin' Roll Baby & Let's Put It All Together
- B-side: "Only for the Children"
- Released: May 5, 1974
- Studio: Sigma Sound, Philadelphia, Pennsylvania
- Genre: Philadelphia soul; R&B
- Length: 4:45; 5:30 (long version)
- Label: Avco
- Songwriters: Thom Bell, Linda Creed
- Producer: Thom Bell

The Stylistics singles chronology
"Rockin' Roll Baby" (1973)	"You Make Me Feel Brand New" (1974)	"Let's Put It All Together" (1974)

"You Make Me Feel Brand New" is a 1974 single by the Philadelphia soul group The Stylistics. An R&B ballad, the song was written by Thom Bell and Linda Creed.

== Background and composition ==
According to a Thom Bell interview for Record Collector :

"When Creed broke one of their golden songwriting rules by mentioning religion (“God bless you”) in You Make Me Feel Brand New, Bell tore a strip off her. He then felt like a heel when she told him that she had written the song about him, and the lyric stayed intact."

Stylistics co-founder, baritone Airrion Love opens the song, then alternates with the falsetto of lead vocalist Russell Thompkins Jr. The song, in a longer five-minute version, had first appeared as a track on the Stylistics' 1973 album, Rockin' Roll Baby, though that version was not released as a single.

== Chart performance ==
"You Make Me Feel Brand New" was the fifth track from their 1974 album, Let's Put It All Together and was released as a single and reached No. 2 on the US Billboard Hot 100 for two weeks, barred from the No. 1 spot by "Billy Don't Be a Hero" by Bo Donaldson and The Heywoods. In addition, it climbed to No. 5 on the Billboard R&B chart. Billboard ranked it as the No. 14 song for 1974.

"You Make Me Feel Brand New" also reached No. 2 (for one week) behind "When Will I See You Again by The Three Degrees on the UK Singles Chart in August 1974. The Stylistics' recording sold over one million copies in the US, earning the band a gold disc The award was presented by the RIAA on May 22, 1974. It was the band's fifth gold disc.

=== Weekly charts ===
Chart (1974)	Peak position
Australia (Kent Music Report)	3
Brazil (Brazilian Top 100)	5
Canada RPM Top Singles	3
Ireland (IRMA)	18
New Zealand (Listener)	11
South Africa (Springbok)	6
UK	2
US Billboard Hot 100	2
US Billboard Adult Contemporary	6
US Billboard Hot Soul Singles	5
US Cash Box Top 100	1

=== Year-end charts ===
Chart (1974)	Rank
Australia (Kent Music Report)	27
Brazil	5
Canada	51
UK	19
US Billboard Hot 100	14

== Influence ==
Neil Sedaka used the song as inspiration to compose the melody of "The Hungry Years", noting that it contained a three-semitone key change that he found particularly appealing and called a "drop-dead chord."

== Other versions ==
"You Make Me Feel Brand New" has been recorded by jazz and pop artists including:

- In 1974 by Peggy Lee.
- In 1975 by Vicky Leandros.
- In 1982 by The Salsoul Orchestra (vocals by Christine Wiltshire and Ray Stevens).
- In 1986 by Babyface.
- In 2003 by Simply Red (on their studio album Home). The Simply Red version reached number 10 on the Billboard Adult Contemporary Chart.
- In 2004, the song was covered by Boyz II Men.
- Swedish singer Björn Skifs released Med varann' (in English Together), a cover of the song in Swedish on his album Schiffz! in 1975 as a duet with ABBA member Anni-Frid Lyngstad.
- Jamaican reggae singer Jacob Miller of Inner Circle recorded the song with Augustus Pablo.
- Japanese musician Tatsuro Yamashita recorded his version in 1986, included on the album On the Street Corner 2.
- Italian singer Mina included the song on the album Rane supreme, in 1987.
- Roberta Flack recorded the song in 1992, reaching No. 50 on the U.S. R&B chart.
- In 2003, Lil Mo made her version of the song and named it, Brand Nu. The instruments had also been enhanced and the lyrics are completely different. This song was included in her second album, Meet the Girl Next Door.
- The song was recorded by Ronnie Milsap on his album Summer Number 17.
- Jazz guitarist Norman Brown recorded the song in 1999.
- Filipino R&B singer Jay R included the song from his 2008 album, Soul in Love.
- American pop singer Johnny Mathis covered the song on his 2008 album, A Night to Remember.
- Rod Stewart recorded it with Mary J. Blige on the former's 2009 album Soulbook.
- Larry Carlton released a mostly instrumental version on his 2011 album Plays the Sounds of Philadelphia.
- Jazz harpist Brandee Younger and bassist Dezron Douglas played an instrumental version on the 2020 album Force Majeure.

== Samples ==
- The song was sampled in American rapper Yung Joc's song "Brand New", which featured Snoop Dogg and Rick Ross.
- In January 2014, South Korean rappers Verbal Jint, San E, Bumkey, Swings, Phantom and Kanto, all from the Brand New Music agency, released "You Make Me Feel Brand New (Brand New Year 2013)", which contains a sample of this song.
- Mystique used a sample of this song for their 2014 song, "Brand New".

== Popular culture ==
- It was also used in TV commercials for Woolite in the mid 1980s and in TV advertisements for Australian department store Myer in the late 1980s. In Britain, a version was used to advertise BioTex stain removing powder.
