= Can't Give You Anything (But My Love) =

1975 single by the Stylistics

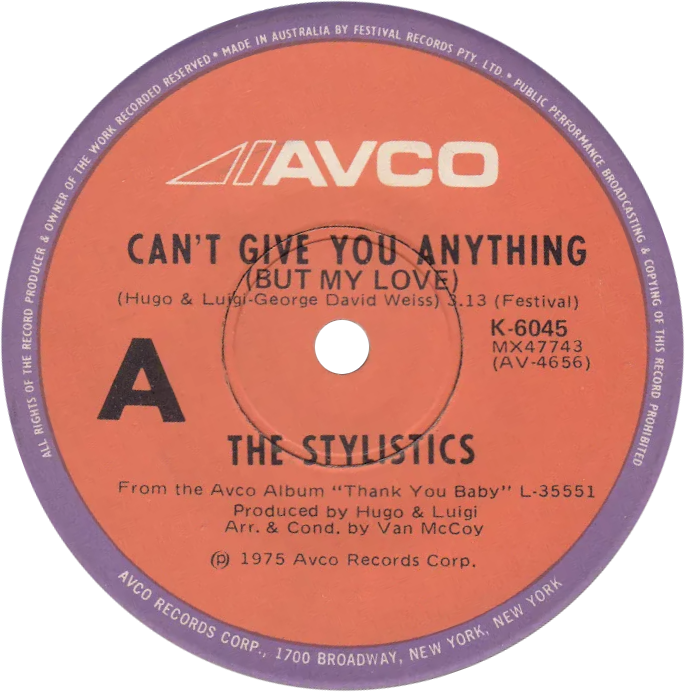
- Side A of the Australian single

Single by The Stylistics

from the album Thank You Baby
- B-side: "I'd Rather Be Hurt by You (Than Be Loved by Somebody Else)"
- Released: July 1975
- Genre: R&B, Philadelphia soul, disco
- Length: 3:13
- Label: Avco
- Songwriters: Hugo Peretti, Luigi Creatore, George David Weiss

The Stylistics singles chronology
"Sing Baby Sing" (1975)	"Can't Give You Anything (But My Love)" (1975)	"Na-Na Is the Saddest Word" (1975)

"Can't Give You Anything (But My Love)" is a 1975 single by the Stylistics. It reached number one for three weeks in the UK in August 1975.

After splitting from record producer Thom Bell in 1974, songwriters/producers Hugo & Luigi and George David Weiss took over, with arrangements by Van McCoy. Although the split with Bell negatively affected the group in the US, the Stylistics continued to be popular in the UK and this was their first and only UK number one single. The track reached number 51 on the US Billboard Hot 100, and number 18 on the corresponding US R&B chart.

== Charts ==
=== Weekly charts ===
Chart (1975–1976)	Peak position
Australia (Kent Music Report)	36
Belgium (Ultratop 50 Flanders)	5
Belgium (Ultratop 50 Wallonia)	9
Canada Top Singles (RPM)	74
Ireland (IRMA)	1
Japan (Oricon)	20
Japan (Oricon Western Music chart)	1
Netherlands (Dutch Top 40)	2
Netherlands (Single Top 100)	2
New Zealand (Recorded Music NZ)	7
Sweden (Sverigetopplistan)	15
UK Singles (Official Charts)	1
US Billboard Hot 100	51
US Billboard Adult Contemporary	34
US Billboard R&B	18
US Billboard Dance Club Songs	13
US Cash Box Top 100	54
West Germany (GfK)	34

=== Year-end charts ===
Chart (1975)	Position
UK Singles (British Market Research Bureau)	3
Netherlands (Dutch Top 40)	18
Netherlands (Single Top 100)	22

== Certifications ==
Region	Certification	Certified units/sales
United Kingdom (BPI)	Gold	500,000^{^}
^{^} Shipments figures based on certification alone.

== Thomas Anders version ==
"Can't Give You Anything (But My Love)"

Single by Thomas Anders

from the album Whispers
- B-side: "Más que amor (Can't Give You Anything But My Love)"
- Released: August 1991
- Recorded: 1990
- Genre: Europop
- Length: 4:10
- Label: East West
- Songwriter: George David Weiss
- Producers: Mike Paxman and Paul Muggleton

Thomas Anders singles chronology
"The Sweet Hello, The Sad Goodbye" (1991)	"Can't Give You Anything (But My Love)" (1991)	"True Love" (1991)

The cover version by Thomas Anders was the second single off his second album, Whispers. The single included versions in both English and Spanish ("Más que amor").

=== Track listings ===
7" single EastWest 9031-75025-7 (Warner), 08.1991

1. "Can't Give You Anything (But My Love)" – 4:10
2. "Más que amor" – 4:09

12" Single EastWest 9031-76005-0 (Warner), 08.1991

1. 'Can't Give You Anything (But My Love)" (Basic Love Mix) – 5:07
2. "Más que amor" (Spanish Club Mix) – 5:09
3. "Can't Give You Anything (But My Love)" (Instrumental Groove Mix) – 5:11

CD-Maxi EastWest 9031-75026-2 (Warner), 08.1991

1. "Can't Give You Anything (But My Love)" (Radio version) – 4:10
2. "Can't Give You Anything (But My Love)" (Extended version) — 6:43
3. "Más que amor" (Extended version) — 6:44
4. "Más que amor" — 4:09

=== Chart positions ===
The single stayed five weeks on the German charts, from October 14 to November 24, 1991, peaking at number 73.

Chart (1991)	Highest position
Germany	73

=== Credits ===
- Producer: Mike Paxman and Paul Muggleton
- Publisher: Music Sales Crop, Melodie der Welt MV
- Mix: Mark "Tufte" Evans
- Lyrics: George David Weiss
- Spanish lyrics: Gómez y Argandoña G.
- Music: George David Weiss
- Chorus: Judie Tzuke, Paul Muggleton, Don Snow, Deborah Robson

== Other versions ==
In 1996, Irish boy band OTT released their version as a single that reached No. 10 in Ireland.

== See also ==
- List of number-one singles from the 1970s (UK)
