= Spinners =

Spinners can refer to:

In music:

- The Spinners (American R&B group), an American R&B/soul group active from 1957 to the present
  - Spinners (album), the group's third studio album, released in 1973
  - The Spinners: Their Early Years, a compilation album
- The Spinners (English band), a British folk group active from 1959 to 1989

Sports teams:

- Greenville Spinners, a former minor league baseball team located in Greenville, South Carolina
- Landis Spinners, a former minor league baseball team in Landis, North Carolina, that existed from 1935 to 1951
- Lowell Spinners, a minor league baseball affiliate of the Boston Red Sox
- Philadelphia Spinners, a professional ultimate (frisbee) team based in Philadelphia, Pennsylvania
- Spartanburg Spinners, a former minor league baseball team located in Spartanburg, South Carolina
- Lancashire Spinners, a semi-professional British basketball club based in Bury, Lancashire, England

== See also ==
- Las Hilanderas (Velázquez) (The Spinners), a 17th-century painting by Diego Velázquez
- Spinner (disambiguation)
