= You Are Everything =

1971 single by the Stylistics

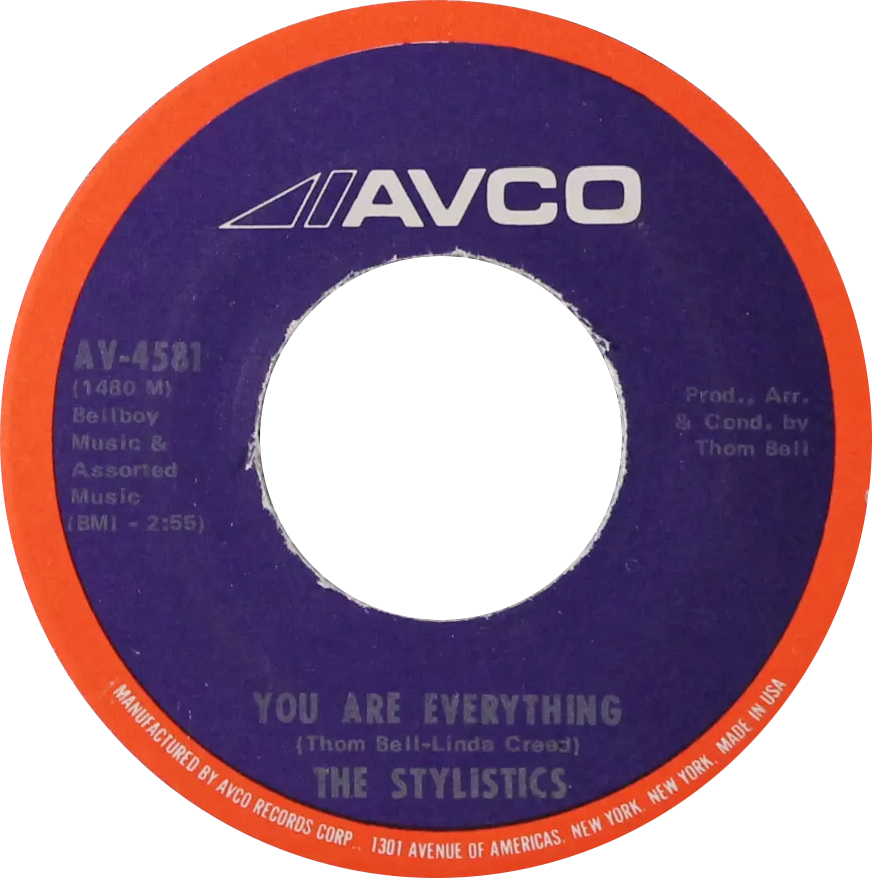
- One of side-A labels of the US single

Single by the Stylistics

from the album The Stylistics
- B-side: "Country Living"
- Released: May 13, 1971
- Recorded: 1971
- Studio: Sigma Sound, Philadelphia, Pennsylvania
- Genre: Philadelphia soul; pop
- Length: 2:55
- Label: Avco
- Songwriters: Thom Bell, Linda Creed
- Producer: Thom Bell

The Stylistics singles chronology
"Stop, Look, Listen (To Your Heart)" (1971)	"You Are Everything" (1971)	"Betcha by Golly, Wow" (1972)

Music video
- "You Are Everything" (Official Lyric Video) on YouTube

"You Are Everything" is a soul song written by Thom Bell and Linda Creed and originally recorded by the Philadelphia soul group the Stylistics.

== The Stylistics version ==
An R&B ballad, it was the sixth track from the Stylistics' self-titled debut album and was released as a single in 1971. It reached number 9 on the U.S. Billboard Hot 100 chart, number 10 on the R&B chart and reached number 24 on the Easy Listening chart. The Stylistics' record sold over one million copies globally, earning the band their first gold disc; the award was presented by the RIAA on January 3, 1972.

Group member Airrion Love sang only the opening harmony with Russell Thompkins, Jr..

The actual background vocals were done by Russell Thompkins, Jr., producer Thom Bell, Carl Helm, Bunny Sigler, Kenny Gamble, and Phil Hurtt.

The rest of the Stylistics never sang on the first three albums that Thom Bell produced, as Russell Thompkins, Jr. explained in several interviews.

The song appeared in two episodes of The Wonder Years, "Denial" and "Double Double Date". It was also used in a 2002 episode of The King of Queens, "Business Affairs". The song was featured at a dance in the 2005 comedy The Ringer.

Chart (1971–1972)	Peak position
Australia KMR	17
Canada RPM Top Singles	25
U.S. Billboard Hot 100	9
U.S. Billboard Easy Listening	24
U.S. Billboard R&B Singles	10

== Marvin Gaye and Diana Ross version ==
"You Are Everything"

Single by Diana Ross & Marvin Gaye

from the album Diana & Marvin
- B-side: "Include Me in Your Life"
- Released: January 1974
- Genre: Soul
- Length: 3:10
- Label: Motown
- Songwriters: Thom Bell, Linda Creed
- Producer: Hal Davis

Diana Ross & Marvin Gaye singles chronology
"My Mistake (Was to Love You)" (1974)	"You Are Everything" (1974)	"Don't Knock My Love" (1974)

Marvin Gaye singles chronology
"My Mistake (Was to Love You)" (1974)	"You Are Everything" (1974)	"Don't Knock My Love" (1974)

Diana Ross singles chronology
"My Mistake (Was to Love You)" (1974)	"You Are Everything" (1974)	"Sleepin'" (1974)

Another version of the song was recorded by one-time Motown singing duo, Diana Ross & Marvin Gaye. Released as the second UK single from their Diana & Marvin album, the song reached #5 in the UK Singles Chart in April 1974, and also became the first official Motown single to be awarded with silver disc for sales in excess of 250,000 copies. It also reached #13 on the Dutch charts and #20 on the Irish Singles Chart. It was never released as a single in the U.S.

=== Certifications ===
Region	Certification	Certified units/sales
United Kingdom (BPI)	Silver	200,000^{‡}
^{‡} Sales+streaming figures based on certification alone.

== Other notable versions ==
Many artists have covered the song. Among the most widely known are:

- In 1973, the Pearls, a 1970s vocal girl duo from Liverpool, were the first artists to chart with this song in the UK, early that year. It was released on the Bell label and reached number 41 on the UK Singles Chart.
- In early 1988, British heavy metal band Judas Priest recorded "You Are Everything" with Stock Aitken Waterman, a British songwriting and record-producing trio. Though this version of the song was never officially released, an excerpt of the recording leaked on YouTube in 2015.
- In 1995, British singers Melanie Williams and Joe Roberts scored a UK top 40 hit with their version of the track, which peaked at number 28.
- In 2005, Vanessa Williams performed the song on her covers album titled Everlasting Love. Her version was a hit on the smooth jazz, dance and Adult Contemporary charts.
