= Betcha by Golly, Wow =

1970 single by Connie Stevens and 1972 hit for the Stylistics

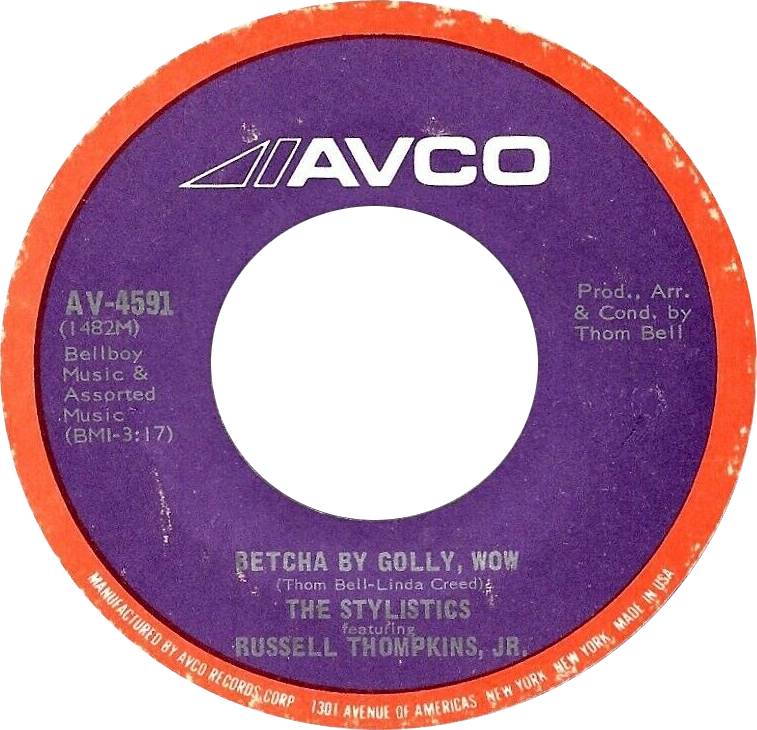
- One of side-A labels of the US single

Single by the Stylistics

from the album The Stylistics
- B-side: "Ebony Eyes"
- Released: February 17, 1972
- Studio: Sigma Sound, Philadelphia, Pennsylvania
- Genre: Philadelphia soul; R&B
- Length: 3:48 (album version); 3:17 (single edit)
- Label: Avco
- Songwriters: Thom Bell; Linda Creed
- Producer: Thom Bell

The Stylistics singles chronology
"You Are Everything" (1971)	"Betcha by Golly, Wow" (1972)	"People Make the World Go Round" (1972)

"Betcha by Golly, Wow" is a song written by Thom Bell and Linda Creed, originally titled "Keep Growing Strong" and recorded by American actress and singer Connie Stevens under the Bell label in 1970. Stevens' recording runs two minutes and thirty seconds. The composition later became a hit when it was released by the Philadelphia soul group the Stylistics in 1972 under its better known title, "Betcha by Golly, Wow".

== The Stylistics version ==
One year after Stevens' original version was released, the Stylistics recorded a more successful cover version as an R&B ballad under the name the song is best known, "Betcha by Golly, Wow". It was the third track from the Stylistics' 1971 debut self-titled album; released as a single in 1972, it reached No. 3 on the US Billboard Hot 100 chart. Billboard ranked it as the No. 18 song for 1972. It also peaked at No. 2 on the Billboard R&B chart, and No. 13 on the UK Singles Chart in July. The single sold over one million copies globally, earning the band a gold disc, their second. The award was presented by the RIAA on April 17. There are two mixes of the song; the 3:17 version released as a single is the one most familiar to listeners, while the 3:48 album version has an instrumental break prior to the song's finale.

== Charts ==
=== Weekly charts ===
Chart (1972)	Peak position
Canada Top Singles (RPM)	20
New Zealand (Listener)	5
UK Singles (OCC)	13
US Billboard Hot 100	3
US Adult Contemporary (Billboard)	7
US Soul Singles (Billboard)	2

=== Year-end charts ===
Chart (1972)	Position
Canada Top Singles (RPM)	48
US Billboard Hot 100	18

== Norman Connors / Phyllis Hyman version ==
Another version of "Betcha by Golly, Wow!" was released 1976 by American musician Norman Connors on his Buddah Records album You Are My Starship, featuring Phyllis Hyman on vocals. What sets this version apart is the extended length (6:23), with alto and soprano saxophone riffs by Carter Jefferson and Gary Bartz. This version reached No. 29 on 1976 US R&B chart.

== Prince version ==
"Betcha by Golly Wow!"
- UK CD single

Single by Prince

from the album Emancipation
- B-side: "Right Back Here in My Arms"
- Released: November 13, 1996
- Recorded: 1995
- Studio: Paisley Park, Chanhassen, Minnesota, US
- Genre: Soul
- Length: 3:30
- Label: NPG/EMI
- Songwriters: Linda Creed; Thom Bell
- Producer: Prince

Prince singles chronology
"Dinner with Delores" (1996)	"Betcha by Golly Wow!" (1996)	"The Holy River" (1997)

Music video
- "Betcha by Golly, Wow" on YouTube

Another version of "Betcha by Golly, Wow!" was released by American musician Prince (his stage name at that time being a symbol with no known pronunciation, see cover art) on his 20th album, Emancipation (1996). Prince had stated that he always wanted to release his own version but his record company, Warner Bros. Records, had not permitted it. The CD single was released in two formats in the UK, one with a picture sleeve and one with an orange cardboard sleeve that included a picture disc and a mini-poster. The song was also issued on cassette. All versions of the single had "Right Back Here in My Arms" as the B-side. Both tracks were the album versions. The track was released as a promotional single in the US; a music video was also produced.

The song was released on Mayte Garcia's (Prince's then-wife) 23rd birthday. Garcia also appeared in the video; she played herself in the doctor's office, confirming she is pregnant and revealing this to Prince when he walks into the room. One of the backgrounds of the video is Prince's own Paisley Park Studios.

It charted fairly well in the US, based on airplay figures (in the US promotional singles were not allowed to chart until late 1998) and almost made the top 10 of the UK Singles Chart.

=== Critical reception ===
Larry Flick from Billboard magazine stated, "He follows the blueprint of the Stylistics' original recording almost to the letter, offering only the scant and fleeting hints of the offbeat brilliance on which he has built his career. That said, this is certainly a pleasant and hit-worthy effort, thanks in large part to a sweetly romantic falsetto vocal and the warm familiarity of the song." Everett True from Melody Maker was negative, writing, "Insipid cover of Stylistics oldie. Breathy vocals and saccharine sentiments recall the worst of the Seventies. This is music punk set out to destroy." A reviewer from Music Week gave the cover version a score of four out of five, adding, "This smoothly-produced debut for The Artist's new label is a sleek and seamless cover of the Stylistics' seventies hit. A hit no doubt, but not one of his classics."

=== Charts ===
Weekly chart performance for Prince's cover
Chart (1996–97)	Peak position
Australia (ARIA)	18
Belgium (Ultratip Bubbling Under Flanders)	5
Europe (European Dance Radio)	2
Germany (GfK)	62
Israel (Israeli Singles Chart)	24
Italy (Musica e dischi)	20
Italy Airplay (Music & Media)	2
Netherlands (Dutch Top 40)	31
Netherlands (Single Top 100)	42
New Zealand (Recorded Music NZ)	24
Switzerland (Schweizer Hitparade)	27
Scottish Singles Sales (Official Charts)	17
UK Singles (Official Charts)	11
UK Hip Hop/R&B (Official Charts)	2
US Hot 100 Airplay (Billboard)	31
US Hot R&B/Hip-Hop Airplay (Billboard)	10
US Rhythmic Top 40 (Billboard)	10
US Mainstream Top 40 (Billboard)	23
US Hot Adult Top 40 Tracks (Billboard)	38
