= Break Up to Make Up =

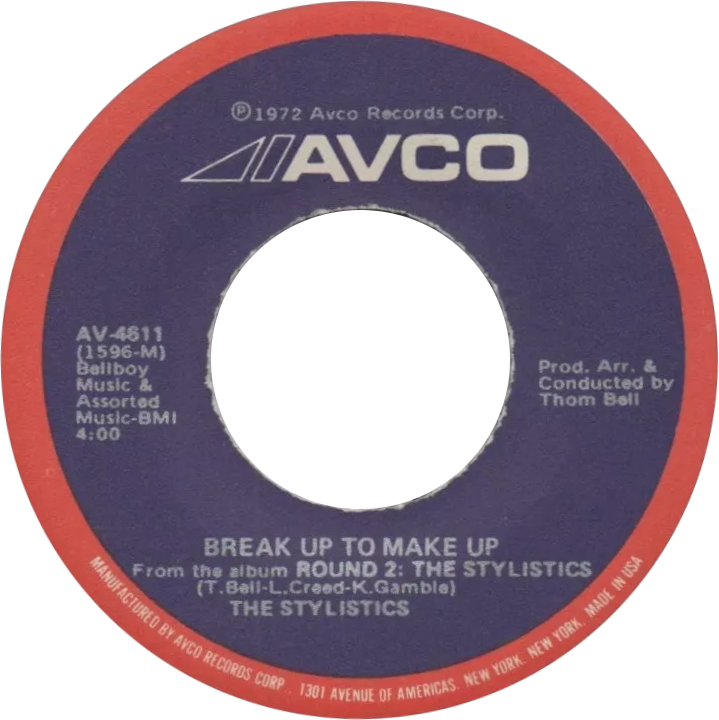
- One of side-A labels of the US single

Single by the Stylistics

from the album Round 2
- B-side: "You and Me"
- Released: February 1973
- Recorded: 1972
- Genre: Philadelphia soul; R&B
- Length: 4:00
- Label: Avco
- Songwriters: Thom Bell, Linda Creed, Kenneth Gamble
- Producer: Thom Bell

The Stylistics singles chronology
"I'm Stone in Love with You" (1972)	"Break Up to Make Up" (1973)	"You'll Never Get to Heaven (If You Break My Heart)" (1973)

"Break Up to Make Up" is a 1973 song by the Philadelphia soul group the Stylistics. The song was written by Thom Bell, Linda Creed, and Kenneth Gamble.

An R&B ballad, it was the seventh track from their 1972 album Round 2. It was released as a single and reached number 5 on the US Billboard Hot 100 chart. The song also climbed to number 5 on the Billboard R&B chart and reached number 34 on the UK Singles Chart in April 1973.

The Stylistics' recording sold over one million copies in the US, earning the band their fourth gold disc The award was presented by the RIAA on April 6, 1973.

== Chart performance ==
Chart (1973)	Peak position
Canada RPM Top Singles	37
UK Singles (OCC)	34
US Billboard Hot 100	5
US R&B (Billboard)	5
US Adult Contemporary (Billboard)	21
