= Linda Creed =

American songwriter (1948–1986)

Linda Creed (Songwriter)
- Linda Creed in Paris, France

Background information
- Born: Linda Diane Creed; December 6, 1948; Philadelphia, Pennsylvania, U.S.
- Died: April 10, 1986 (aged 37) Ambler, Pennsylvania, U.S.
- Education: Germantown High School
- Genres: R&B, soul, pop
- Occupations: Songwriter, lyricist, record producer, background singer

Linda Diane Creed (December 6, 1948 – April 10, 1986), also known by her married name Linda Creed Epstein, was an American songwriter, lyricist, record producer, and background vocalist. She was a prominent contributor to the development of Philadelphia soul during the 1970s and 1980s, particularly through her songwriting partnership with producer and arranger Thom Bell. Their collaborations helped establish the genre's distinctive combination of orchestral arrangements, soulful melodies, and emotionally expressive lyrics.

Creed wrote or co-wrote songs recorded by numerous artists, including The Stylistics, The Spinners, Teddy Pendergrass, Johnny Mathis, Dionne Warwick, George Benson, and Whitney Houston. Her best-known compositions include "You Are Everything", "Betcha by Golly, Wow", "You Make Me Feel Brand New", "The Rubberband Man", and "Greatest Love of All". Her songwriting contributed to numerous commercially successful recordings and became an important part of the Philadelphia soul repertoire.

In collaboration with composer Michael Masser, Creed co-wrote "Greatest Love of All", originally recorded by George Benson for the 1977 film The Greatest. Whitney Houston's later recording reached number one on the Billboard Hot 100 in May 1986, shortly after Creed's death from breast cancer at the age of 37.

Creed was posthumously inducted into the Songwriters Hall of Fame in 1992 and the Rock and Roll Hall of Fame in 2026, receiving the latter institution's Musical Excellence Award in recognition of her contributions to popular music.

== Career ==
=== Early Musical Career ===
Creed grew up in the Mount Airy neighborhood of Philadelphia, Pennsylvania, and attended Germantown High School. As a teenager, she performed as the lead singer of a local group called Raw Soul, which appeared at venues including the Philadelphia Athletic Club and Sid Booker's Highline Lounge.

Following high school, Creed moved to New York City, where she worked as a secretary for the music publishing company Mills Music. During this period, she pursued opportunities as a songwriter before returning to Philadelphia after approximately eight months. Her experiences away from home later inspired the composition "I'm Coming Home", which she co-wrote with Thom Bell.

Creed's professional songwriting career gained momentum in 1970 when Dusty Springfield recorded her composition "I Wanna Be a Free Girl". She subsequently became associated with the Philadelphia songwriting and production circle of Kenny Gamble, Leon Huff, and Thom Bell.

=== Collaboration with Thom Bell and Philadelphia Soul ===
Creed formed a songwriting partnership with composer, arranger, and producer Thom Bell. Their collaboration became closely associated with the developing Philadelphia soul sound, which incorporated orchestral arrangements, sophisticated production, and elements of rhythm and blues. Bell's compositions and arrangements were paired with Creed's lyrics, which frequently explored themes of love, relationships, and personal experiences.

Their first major success together was "Stop, Look, Listen (To Your Heart)", recorded by The Stylistics in 1971. Creed and Bell subsequently wrote several of the group's best-known recordings, including "You Are Everything", "Betcha by Golly, Wow", "Break Up to Make Up", "People Make the World Go Round", and "You Make Me Feel Brand New". They also co-wrote "I'm Stone in Love with You" with Bell's brother Tony Bell.

Creed and Bell also wrote songs recorded by The Spinners, including "Ghetto Child" and "The Rubberband Man". Their compositions contributed to the commercial success of both the Stylistics and the Spinners during the 1970s and became closely associated with the Philadelphia soul movement.

Creed's songwriting was recorded by numerous other performers, including Johnny Mathis, Teddy Pendergrass, Dionne Warwick, and Phyllis Hyman. Her credits included "Life Is a Song Worth Singing", recorded by Mathis and Pendergrass, and "Old Friend", recorded by Hyman.

In addition to songwriting, Creed worked as a background vocalist and record producer. She contributed background vocals to recordings by the Spinners and the Stylistics, expanding her involvement in the recording process beyond lyric writing.

=== Later Songwriting & Production ===
In 1976, Creed relocated to Hollywood with her husband and daughter. During this period, she undertook a production project with Lonnie Jordan, the lead singer and keyboardist of the funk band War.

Creed subsequently collaborated with composer and producer Michael Masser. Together they wrote "Greatest Love of All" for the 1977 film The Greatest, a biographical film about boxer Muhammad Ali. The song was originally recorded by George Benson, whose recording reached number 24 on the Billboard Hot 100.

Following her return to the Philadelphia area in 1980, Creed resumed her collaboration with Thom Bell. A November 1980 report in Billboard documented their reunion after several years of pursuing separate professional projects.

Throughout the early 1980s, Creed continued writing material recorded by artists including Johnny Gill, Stacy Lattisaw, the Stylistics, and Teddy Pendergrass. She also co-wrote "Hold Me" with Michael Masser, which was recorded as a duet by Pendergrass and Whitney Houston in 1984.

Creed continued working in record production during the final years of her life, including projects associated with Johnny Gill.

=== Commercial Success of "Greatest Love of All" ===
Whitney Houston recorded "Greatest Love of All" for her 1985 self-titled debut album, Whitney Houston. Released as a single in March 1986, Houston's recording brought renewed commercial attention to the composition, which Creed and Michael Masser had written nearly a decade earlier.

On April 10, 1986, Creed died of breast cancer at the age of 37, while Houston's recording was climbing the music charts. The single reached number one on the Billboard Hot 100 chart dated May 17, 1986, just 37 days after Creed's death. It remained at number one for three consecutive weeks and became Houston's third consecutive chart-topping single.

The song had previously reached number one on the Billboard Adult Contemporary chart dated April 26, 1986, where it remained for five consecutive weeks.

The commercial success of Houston's recording occurred shortly after Creed's death, bringing one of her compositions to the top of the American pop charts nearly a decade after its original release. Contemporary reporting in Billboard noted both the song's chart performance and Creed's death during the same period.

== Personal Life ==
In 1972, Creed married Stephen Lee Epstein, a Philadelphia music promoter known as "Eppy". Their marriage coincided with the early success of her songwriting career and her growing association with the Philadelphia soul music scene.

The couple had two daughters, Roni Lee and Dana Creed. In 1976, Creed and her husband relocated from Philadelphia to Hollywood, California. While living in California, Creed continued her involvement in the recording industry, including a production project with Lonnie Jordan of the band War.

In 1980, the family returned to the Philadelphia area. Their second daughter, Dana Creed, was born that year. Following the family's return, Creed continued her songwriting and production work, including renewed collaborations with Thom Bell and projects with other recording artists.

Creed was diagnosed with breast cancer in the late 1970s and continued her professional career while undergoing treatment and raising her family. Her work during this period included her collaboration with Michael Masser on "Greatest Love of All", originally recorded by George Benson in 1977 and later made internationally successful by Whitney Houston.

Creed and Epstein remained married until her death in April 1986. She was 37 years old. Contemporary obituaries identified Epstein and their two daughters among her surviving family members.

== Death ==
Though diagnosed with breast cancer at 26, Creed continued working, teaming with composer Michael Masser on the song "The Greatest Love of All". Creed wrote the lyrics in the midst of her struggle with cancer. They describe her feelings about coping with challenges one faces, being strong whether you succeed or fail, and passing that strength on to children to carry with them into their adult lives.

"The Greatest Love of All" was the main theme of The Greatest, a 1977 biopic of boxer Muhammad Ali. The song was originally recorded by George Benson and was released as a single in 1977, peaking at No. 2 on the R&B chart. In December 1984, "The Greatest Love of All" was recorded by Whitney Houston for her 1985 self-titled debut album; it topped the singles charts in May 1986.

Weeks before Houston's version reached number one, Creed died of breast cancer on April 10, 1986, at the age of 37. The following year, her family and friends established the Linda Creed Breast Cancer Organization in her honor. The organization serves women in Pennsylvania and the surrounding counties.

In 1992, Creed was posthumously inducted into the Songwriters Hall of Fame. In 2026, Creed was inducted into the Rock and Roll Hall of Fame through the musical excellence category.

== Rock & Roll Hall of Fame ==
In 2026, Linda Creed was posthumously inducted into the Rock and Roll Hall of Fame as a recipient of the Musical Excellence Award, recognizing her contributions to songwriting, recorded music, and the development of Philadelphia soul. Her induction marked forty years since her death in 1986.

The induction ceremony was held on November 14, 2026, at the Peacock Theater in Los Angeles, California, as part of the Rock & Roll Hall of Fame's 41st annual induction celebration. Creed was honored alongside other recipients of the Musical Excellence Award, including Arif Mardin, Jimmy Miller, and Rick Rubin.

Creed's induction was commemorated through a video tribute featuring reflections on her songwriting and musical influence. Among those participating in the tribute were John Oates, Jimmy Jam, and members of Talking Heads. The presentation recognized Creed's contributions to recordings by The Stylistics, The Spinners, and other artists whose work helped define the Philadelphia soul sound.

Her induction followed the Rock & Roll Hall of Fame's earlier recognition of several of her Philadelphia soul contemporaries, including Kenny Gamble and Leon Huff in 2008 and her longtime songwriting collaborator Thom Bell in 2025.

== Selected Songwriting Credits ==
This is a partial list of songs written or co-written by Linda Creed.

- "The Greatest Love of All" – originally recorded in 1977 by George Benson; later covered by Whitney Houston.
- "Stop, Look, Listen (To Your Heart)" – originally recorded by The Stylistics; also covered by Diana Ross and Marvin Gaye.
- "You Are Everything" – originally recorded by The Stylistics; later covered by Diana Ross and Marvin Gaye.
- "Betcha by Golly, Wow" – originally recorded by Connie Stevens as "Keep Growing Strong", later made famous by The Stylistics, later covered by Phyllis Hyman and Prince.
- "People Make the World Go Round" – originally recorded by The Stylistics; later covered by Angela Bofill and Michael Jackson.
- "I'm Stone in Love with You" – The Stylistics.
- "Break Up to Make Up" – The Stylistics.
- "Rockin' Roll Baby" – The Stylistics.
- "You Make Me Feel Brand New" – originally recorded by The Stylistics, later recorded by Roberta Flack.
- "Ghetto Child" – The Spinners.
- "I'm Coming Home" – originally recorded by Johnny Mathis, later covered by The Spinners.
- "Life Is a Song Worth Singing" – originally recorded by Johnny Mathis, later covered by Teddy Pendergrass.
- "I Don't Want to Lose You" – The Spinners.
- "The Rubberband Man" – The Spinners.
- "Old Friend" – Phyllis Hyman.
- "Half Crazy" – Johnny Gill.
- "Hold Me" – Teddy Pendergrass (duet with Whitney Houston).
- "You Are the Love of My Life" – George Benson (duet with Roberta Flack).
- "Help Me Find a Way (To Say I Love You) – Little Anthony & The Imperials.
- "If I Love You"- originally recorded by Little Anthony & The Imperials, later covered by The Stylistics.

=== Music Publishing & Unreleased Compositions ===
Linda Creed's songwriting legacy also includes unreleased compositions. DeCreed Music Publishing is associated with the management and potential licensing of previously unreleased material written by Creed. Adam Donahue serves as a contact for inquiries concerning these works.
