= The Stylistics =

American music group

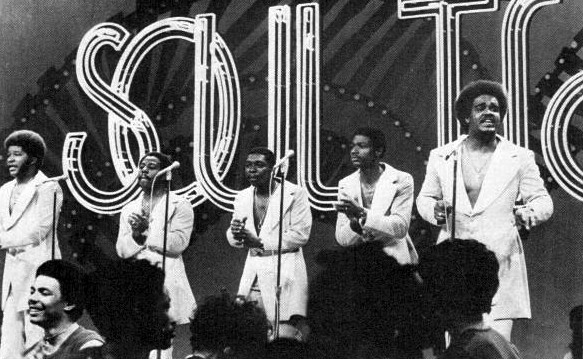
- The Stylistics performing on Soul Train in 1974

Background information
- Origin: Philadelphia, Pennsylvania, U.S.
- Genres: Philadelphia soul, R&B, Pop
- Years active: 1968–present
- Labels: Sebring; Avco; H&L; Mercury; TSOP; Philadelphia International; Streetwise; Amherst; Marathon
- Members: Airrion Love; Herb Murrell; Jason Sharp
- Past members: Russell Thompkins Jr.; James Dunn; James Smith; Raymond Johnson; Van Fields; Harold Eban Brown; Barrington "Bo" Henderson
- Website: thestylistics.org

The Stylistics are an American Philadelphia soul group that achieved their greatest chart success in the 1970s. They formed in 1968, with a lineup of singers Russell Thompkins Jr., Herb Murrell, Airrion Love, James Smith, and James Dunn. All of their U.S. hits were ballads characterized by the falsetto of Russell Thompkins Jr. and the production of Thom Bell. During the early 1970s, the group had twelve consecutive R&B top ten hits including "Stop, Look, Listen", "You Are Everything", "Betcha by Golly, Wow", "I'm Stone in Love with You", "Break Up to Make Up", "People Make the World Go Round" and "You Make Me Feel Brand New". They had five gold singles and three gold albums.

== Career ==
=== Early years ===
The Stylistics were created from two Philadelphia groups, the Percussions and the Monarchs. The two bands attended the same high school. The Stylistics was first conceived when Airrion Love's English teacher, Beverly Hamilton, suggested the two bands merge. Russell Thompkins Jr., James Smith, and Airrion Love came from the Monarchs. James Dunn and Herb Murrell were in the Percussions. The name "the Stylistics" came from their guitar player Robert Douglas.

Three original members, Airrion Love, James Dunn, and Russell Thompkins Jr., were born in Philadelphia. Herb Murrell was born in Lane, South Carolina and James Smith was born in New York City, but moved to Philadelphia after his father's death in 1962. In 1970, the group recorded "You're a Big Girl Now", a song their road manager Marty Bryant co-wrote with Robert Douglas, a member of their backing band Slim and the Boys, and the single became a regional hit for Sebring Records. Producer Bill Perry spent $400 to record the song in the Virtue Studios in Philadelphia. The larger Avco Records soon signed the Stylistics, and the single eventually climbed to No. 7 on the US Billboard R&B chart in early 1971.

=== Success: The Bell/Creed years ===
After signing to Avco, the record label approached producer Thom Bell, who had already produced a catalogue of hits for the Delfonics, to work with the group. The Stylistics auditioned for Bell, but he was initially unimpressed. He ultimately agreed to produce the group because he believed in the potential of lead singer Russell Thompkins, Jr.'s distinctive, nasal high tenor and falsetto voice. Avco gave Bell complete creative control over the Stylistics and he proceeded to focus the group's sound exclusively around Thompkins's voice. On most of the group hits, Bell would have Thompkins sing virtually solo. The first song recorded with Bell and his collaborator, lyricist Linda Creed, was "Stop, Look, Listen".

The Stylistics with Thom Bell in 1972

Their hits from the period which are on three albums included "Betcha by Golly, Wow" (U.S. No. 3), "I'm Stone in Love with You", "Break Up to Make Up" (U.S. No. 5), "You Make Me Feel Brand New" featuring Thompkins singing a lead vocal duet with Airrion Love, "Stop, Look, Listen (To Your Heart)", "You Are Everything" and the Top 20 pop chart hit "Rockin' Roll Baby" (U.S. No. 14). "You Make Me Feel Brand New", the group's biggest U.S. hit, holding at No. 2 for two weeks in 1974, was one of the group's five U.S. gold singles, and was nominated for a Grammy Award that year in the category Best Pop Vocal Performance By A Duo, Group Or Chorus.

The Stylistics also found a path on to adult contemporary airwaves, and the group made Billboard magazine's Easy Listening singles chart twelve times from 1971 to 1976, with three entries ("Betcha by Golly, Wow", "You Make Me Feel Brand New" and "You'll Never Get to Heaven (If You Break My Heart)") reaching the Top 10. Every single that Bell produced for the Stylistics was a Top Ten R&B hit, and several—"You Are Everything", "Betcha by Golly Wow!", "I'm Stone in Love with You", "Break Up to Make Up" and "You Make Me Feel Brand New"—were also Top Ten pop chart hits. The group also had commercial success with hits with the songs throughout Europe.

=== Changing style: Continuing international success ===
Thom Bell stopped working with the Stylistics in 1974, and the split proved commercially difficult for the group in the U.S. They struggled to find the right material, although their partnership with label owners Hugo & Luigi as producers and arranger Van McCoy started well, with "Let's Put It All Together" (No. 18 pop, No. 8 R&B) and "Heavy Fallin' Out" (No. 4 R&B, No. 41 pop). Later singles were notably less successful, but as U.S. success began to wane, their popularity in Europe, and especially the United Kingdom, increased. Indeed, the lighter 'pop' sound fashioned by McCoy and Hugo & Luigi gave the group a U.K. No. 1 in 1975 with "Can't Give You Anything (But My Love)". Further success with "Sing Baby Sing", "Na Na Is the Saddest Word", "Funky Weekend" and "Can't Help Falling in Love" continued the group's European popularity. The Stylistics recorded "Disco Baby", "Love is the Answer" and "16 Bars" also. They are one of the few U.S. acts to have two chart-topping greatest hits albums in the U.K.

The Stylistics switched record labels during this period as Avco Records transitioned into H&L Records in 1976. Notwithstanding this, the band began to struggle with increasingly weak material, and although the singles and albums came out as before, by 1978 chart success had vanished; even a move to Mercury in 1978, for two albums produced by Teddy Randazzo, failed to produce any major success. Russell Thompkins Jr. wrote (in the sleevenotes for the re-issue of the 1976 album, Fabulous) that the group began to feel that the music they were recording was becoming dated, and not in keeping with the popular disco sound of the late 1970s.

In 1979, they had a small part in the movie Hair, directed by Miloš Forman, where they play conservative army officers. They double Nell Carter in singing a song called "White Boys".

=== Later years ===
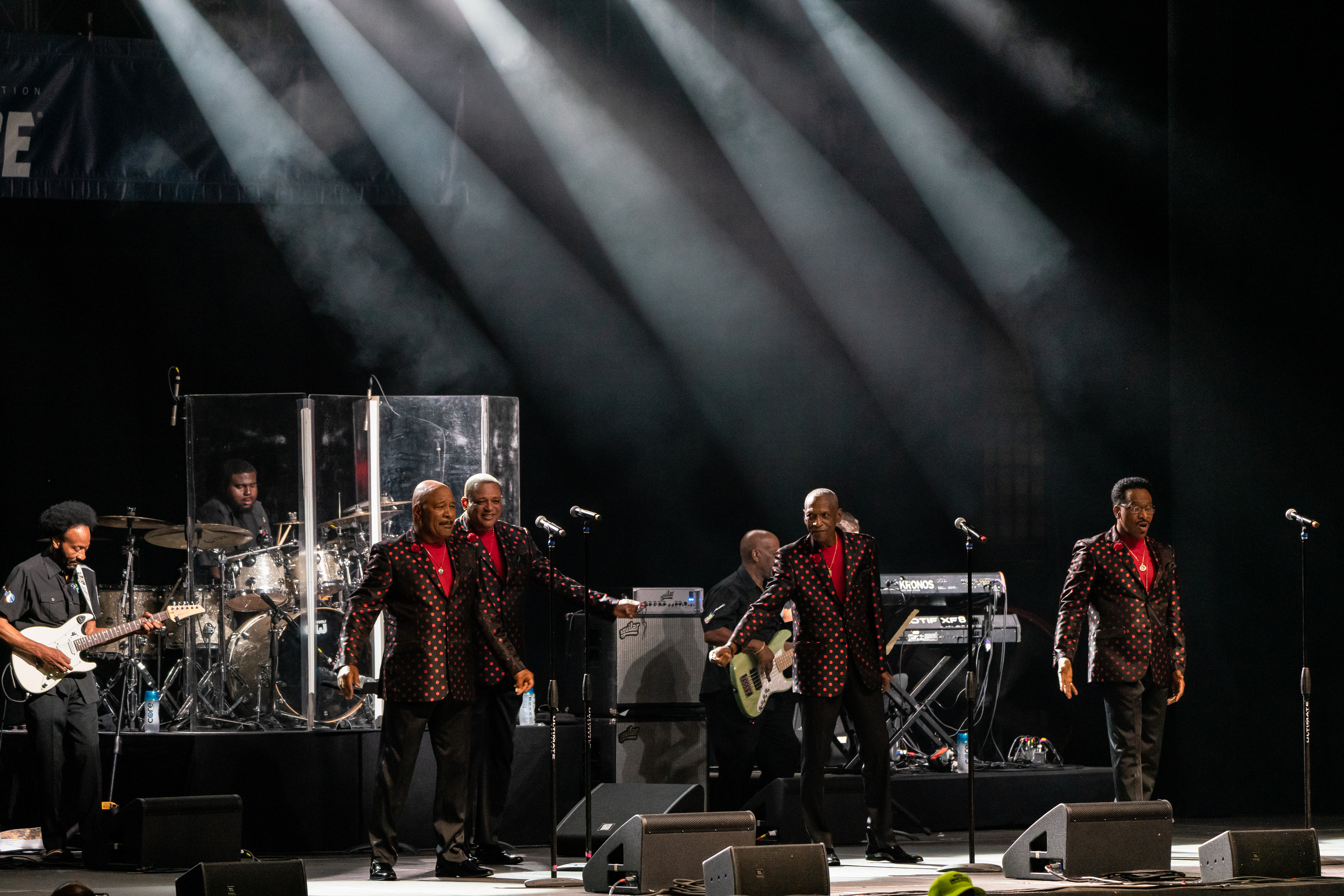
The Stylistics performing at Ford Amphitheater at Coney Island in 2019

In 1980, the group reunited with Thom Bell and signed with Philadelphia International Records subsidiary, TSOP Records. They released the single "Hurry Up This Way Again" in 1980 which was in the R&B Top 20 (peaking at No. 18). Both James Dunn and James Smith departed due to conflicts over the direction of the group; Dunn left before the recording of the album Hurry Up This Way Again (1980) and Smith after the recording of Closer Than Close in 1981. Nevertheless, the group continued, recruiting new member Raymond Johnson, but Johnson departed in 1985, leaving the group as a trio. Love, Murrell, and Thompkins continued to tour until 2000, when Thompkins, Jr. left the group.

In 2000, singer Eban Brown (formerly of the Delfonics, the Manhattans, and Ray, Goodman and Brown) replaced Thompkins as lead singer. That same year, tenor singer Van Fields, who had previously sung with the A Cappella group "A Perfect Blend", joined, enabling the Stylistics to grow from a trio back to a quartet. The group was featured live on the DVD The Stylistics Live at the Convocation Center (2006), as well as with other artists of the 1970s on the DVD, 70s Soul Jam.

In 2004, after having left the Stylistics in 2000, former lead singer Thompkins launched his own group called Russell Thompkins Jr, & the New Stylistics, returning with former member Johnson, plus James Ranton and Jonathan Buckson. They were featured on the DVD Old School Soul Party Live!, which was part of the PBS My Music series. In 2010, they released an album entitled That Same Way by LAC Management. In 2011, Fields departed from the group after 11 years, due to creative differences, and was replaced by singer Jason Sharp.

In January 2018, after 18 years with the Stylistics, Brown, who is also a jazz guitarist and composer, announced his departure to concentrate on his solo career. He since performed at venues in the States and overseas as a solo artist. Brown was initially replaced by Michael Muse, and after a few months, he was replaced by former Temptation Barrington "Bo" Henderson. In 2018, the Stylistics celebrated their 50th anniversary in the music industry. The accomplishment was acknowledged at venues throughout the year during their 50th anniversary tour in the U.S. and overseas.

As of 2024, the remaining members of the original group, Love and Murrell (joined by Jason Sharp, a newer member) are still performing, continuing the Stylistics' legacy with their unit, while Thompkins and his New Stylistics continue to perform as well. James Smith and James Dunn are retired from singing. Barrington "Bo" Henderson left the Stylistics in August 2024, and instead of replacing him, bass singer Sharp moved to lead tenor vocals, making the group a trio for the first time since 2000. On February 1, 2025, it was announced that The Stylistics will be inducted into The Atlantic City Walk of Fame on Monday, April 28, 2025. Recording artists Ray, Goodman & Brown, Blue Magic, Jean Carne, and Phyllis Hyman are also being inducted.

== Members ==
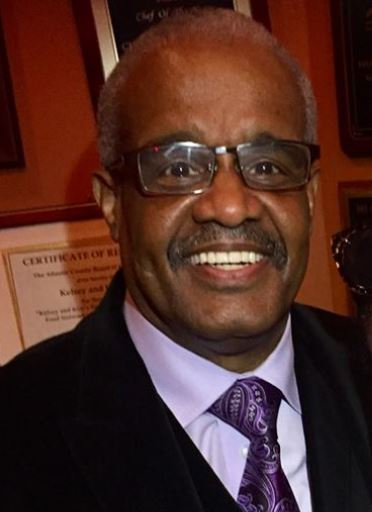
Russell Thompkins Jr. was the tenor lead singer for the Stylistics from 1968 to 2000.

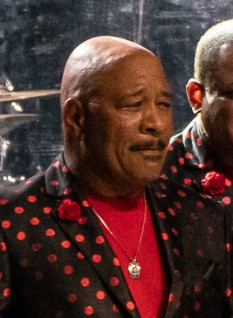
Airrion Love has served as baritone singer since 1968.

=== Current members ===
- Airrion Love – baritone (1968–present)
- Herb Murrell – baritone (1968–present)
- Jason Sharp – bass / tenor (2011–2024), lead tenor (2024–present)

=== Former members ===
- Russell Thompkins Jr. – tenor lead vocals (1968–2000)
- James Dunn – baritone (1968–1980)
- James Smith – bass (1968–1981)
- Raymond Johnson – bass (1981–1985)
- Harold Eban Brown – tenor lead vocals (2000–2018)
- Van Fields – bass (2000–2011)
- Barrington "Bo" Henderson – tenor lead vocals (2018–2024)

Group Lineup

1968-1977	1977-1981	1981-1985	1985-2000
Airrion Love - baritone; Herb Murrell - baritone; Russell Thompkins, Jr. - lead tenor; James Dunn - baritone; James Smith - bass	Airrion Love - baritone; Herb Murrell - baritone; Russell Thompkins, Jr. - lead tenor; James Smith - bass	Airrion Love - baritone; Herb Murrell - baritone; Russell Thompkins, Jr. - lead tenor; Raymond Johnson - bass	Airrion Love - baritone; Herb Murrell - baritone; Russell Thompkins, Jr. - lead tenor
2000-2011	2011-2018	2018-2024	2024–present
Airrion Love - baritone; Herb Murrell - baritone; Harold Eban Brown - lead tenor; Van Fields - bass	Airrion Love - baritone; Herb Murrell - baritone; Harold Eban Brown - lead tenor; Jason Sharp - tenor	Airrion Love - baritone; Herb Murrell - baritone; Barrington “Bo” Henderson - lead tenor; Jason Sharp - tenor	Airrion Love - baritone; Herb Murrell - baritone; Jason Sharp - lead tenor

== Awards and recognition ==
=== Inductions ===
- In 1994, the Stylistics were inducted into the Philadelphia Music Alliance Walk of Fame.
- The Stylistics were inducted into the Vocal Group Hall of Fame in 2004.
- The Stylistics were inducted into the National R&B Music Society's Atlantic City Walk of Fame, on Monday, April 28, 2025, in Brighton Park. Russell Thompkins Jr., Airron Love, Herb Murrell, James Smith and James Dunn are the inductees. Ray, Goodman & Brown, Blue Magic, Jean Carne and Phyllis Hyman were also inducted.

=== RIAA Gold certifications ===
Between January 1972 and August 1974 the Stylistics had five gold singles and three gold albums.

==== Albums ====
- February 16, 1973 - The Stylistics
- June 14, 1973 - Round 2
- August 12, 1974 - Let's Put It All Together

==== Singles ====
- January 3, 1972 - "You Are Everything"
- April 17, 1972 - "Betcha by Golly Wow"
- December 13, 1972 - "I'm Stone in Love with You"
- April 6, 1973 - "Break Up to Make Up"
- May 22, 1974 - "You Make Me Feel Brand New"

== Film and television appearances ==
The Stylistics television appearances.
Top of the Pops
The Stylistics appeared 10 times on Top of the Pops between 1972 and 1978.

- Episode #15.14 (1978)
- Episode #14.39 (1977)
- Episode #14.15 (1977)
- Episode #14.13 (1977)
- Episode #13.16 (1976)
- Top of the Pops '75: Part 2 (1975)
- Episode #11.18 (1974)
- Episode #11.4 (1974)
- Episode #9.42 (1972)
- Episode #9.30 (1972)

The Mike Douglas Show
The Stylistics appeared six times on the show between 1972 and 1978.

- Episode #17.219 (1978)
- Episode #15.217 (1976)
- Episode #15.143 (1976)
- Episode #14.155 (1975)
- Episode #14.40 (1974)
- Episode #12.80 (1972)

The Midnight Special
The Stylistics appeared in four episodes of the show.

- 4th appearance (1974)
- 3rd appearance (1973)
- 2nd appearance (1973)
- 1st appearance (1973)

Soul Train
The Stylistic appeared in two episodes of Soul Train.

- Episode #10.15 (1984)
- Episode #3.27 (1974)

Friday Night with Jonathan Ross

- Episode #17.9 (2009)

Showtime at the Apollo

- Episode #17.15 (2004)

Sinbad's "Soul Music Festival: Part 5 1999"

- The Stylistics appeared on the TV Special that took place in St. Thomas, Virgin Islands and was aired on HBO

The Vera Lynn Show

- Episode #2.1 (1975)

Saturday Night Live
In 1975, the Stylistics appeared on the 1st season of Saturday Night Live.

- Episode #1.8 (1975)

The Dinah Shore Show
The Stylistics appeared on the first season of The Dinah Shore Show.

- Episode #1.181 (1974)

Your Hit Parade

- Episode #2 (1974)

Don Kirshner's Rock Concert

- Episode #2.3 (1974)

60s and 70s Soul Celebration (My Music Presents) (PBS)

- November 30, 2024

== See also ==
- List of soul musicians
- List of R&B musicians
- List of disco artists (S-Z)
- List of people from Philadelphia
- Music of Philadelphia
- List of artists who reached number one on the UK Singles Chart
- List of guests appearing on The Midnight Special
- List of performers on Top of the Pops
