= Thom Bell =

American producer, arranger, and songwriter (1943–2022)

- Bell at the Beacon Theatre in Manhattan, New York for the Grammy Salute to Music Legends, 2017

Background information
- Born: Thomas Randolph Bell; January 26, 1943; Kingston, Colony of Jamaica
- Origin: Philadelphia, Pennsylvania, U.S.
- Died: December 22, 2022 (aged 79) Bellingham, Washington, U.S.
- Genres: Philadelphia soul; R&B; soul; pop
- Occupations: Record producer; arranger; songwriter; composer; pianist; singer
- Years active: 1959–2022
- Formerly of: MFSB

Thomas Randolph Bell (January 26, 1943 – December 22, 2022) was an American record producer, arranger, and songwriter known as one of the creators of Philadelphia soul in the 1970s. Hailed as one of the most prolific R&B songwriters and producers ever, Bell found success crafting songs for the Delfonics, the Stylistics, and the Spinners. In June 2006, Bell was inducted into the Songwriters Hall of Fame. In 2016, Bell was inducted into the Musicians Hall of Fame and Museum. In 2025, Bell was posthumously inducted into the Rock and Roll Hall of Fame in the Musical Excellence Award category.

== Background ==
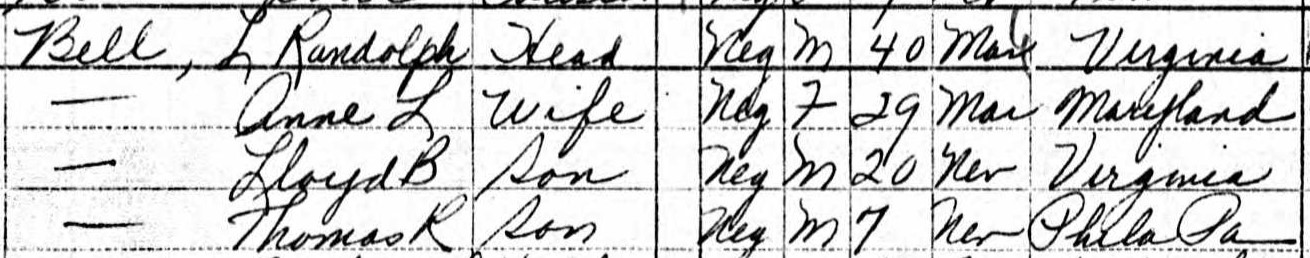
Thom Bell, listed with his parents and an older brother, Lloyd in a US census in 1950

Bell was born on January 26, 1943 in Kingston, Jamaica, to Anna and Leroy Bell, and moved to Philadelphia with his parents when he was four, according to an interview Bell had with Terry Gross on NPR's Fresh Air. Both of Bell's parents were from Jamaica. Thomas Bedward Burke, Bell's maternal grandfather, was born in Kingston.

Known as Thom, Bell was one of eleven siblings. His mother, Anna, worked as a stenographer and was a pianist. Leroy, his father, owned a fish market and restaurant in addition to being musical, playing the accordion and Hawaiian guitar.

== Career ==
Bell was classically trained as a musician and sang as a teenager with Kenny Gamble, Leon Huff, and Daryl Hall (of Hall & Oates fame). Bell's first big break in soul music was with Cameo Records in Philadelphia where he worked as a session player and arranger. In 1967, he was introduced to a local group called The Delfonics, and he produced two early singles for them on the Moon Shot and Cameo labels. Soon Bell's production aesthetic yielded several big hits for the group on the Philly Groove label, run by their manager Stan Watson. The releases included "La-La (Means I Love You)" and "Didn't I (Blow Your Mind This Time)," the latter of which was nominated for a Grammy Award in 1970.

Bell joined the fast-growing record production company operated by Kenny Gamble and Leon Huff in Philadelphia, working as an arranger for acts including Jerry Butler, Archie Bell & the Drells, Jerry Bell, The O'Jays, and Dusty Springfield. He arranged big hits, including the O'Jays' popular "Back Stabbers," on Gamble and Huff's record label, Philadelphia International Records, which the two launched in 1971. Bell then joined Gamble and Huff in setting up a publishing company for their songs, Mighty Three Music.

By 1971, Bell had moved on to produce a local group, the Stylistics on Avco Records. He had started to work with songwriter Linda Creed, from Philadelphia; their partnership became one of the era's dominant soul songwriting teams, writing Stylistics hits including "Stop, Look, Listen (To Your Heart)", "You Are Everything", "Betcha by Golly, Wow", "Break Up to Make Up", "You Make Me Feel Brand New", and "I'm Stone in Love with You" (the last co-written with Bell's brother Tony). In 1972, Bell agreed to produce The Spinners for Atlantic Records. The group had left their longtime label, Motown, after years of only occasional success there. He made The Spinners a hit recording act, producing five gold albums and top-ten singles including "I'll Be Around", "Could It Be I'm Falling in Love", "Games People Play", and "The Rubberband Man". In 1974, he was awarded a Grammy for Best Producer of the Year.

In 1975, Bell produced an album for Dionne Warwick called Track of the Cat, which followed "Then Came You," her collaboration with Bell and the Spinners from 1974. It topped the Billboard Hot 100 reaching number two on the R&B chart. Bell worked in the mid-to-late 1970s with Johnny Mathis (two albums), Billy Paul, Ronnie Dyson, Little Anthony and the Imperials, the R&B group New York City, and others. Then Bell had success with Deniece Williams including her R&B number-one and top-ten remake of The Royalettes' "It's Gonna Take a Miracle" in 1982; Elton John, whose EP The Thom Bell Sessions featured backing vocals by the Spinners and produced the top-ten hit "Mama Can't Buy You Love" in 1979; and James Ingram, whose "I Don't Have the Heart" became Bell's second number-one pop hit, in 1990. Other artists Bell produced in the 1980s included The Temptations, Phyllis Hyman, and Dee Dee Bridgewater; he also re-united briefly with the Stylistics in 1981 on Philadelphia International's subsidiary, TSOP. Warner Chappell Music acquired Mighty Three Music in 1990. A December 2008 interview with Bell featured on the Philly Soul box set, Love Train, stated he would soon compose a piece for the Philadelphia Orchestra. Past Orchestra members played in MFSB, the house band who played on many Bell productions.

Bell was known for being a perfectionist in his writing and very budget-conscious, demanding that session musicians play his compositions as they were written and not improvise.

== Personal life ==
He married Vanessa Joanne Wittrock in Seattle on December 29, 1985. He had six children.

On December 22, 2022 at the age of 79, Bell died at his home in Bellingham, Washington, north of Everett, after a lengthy illness.

== Producing and songwriting ==
- 1965: "Pass Me By" – Hattie Winston
- 1968: "La-La (Means I Love You)" – The Delfonics
- 1969: "Brand New Me" - Dusty Springfield
- 1970: "Didn't I (Blow Your Mind This Time)" – The Delfonics
- 1971: "Hey Love" – The Delfonics
- 1971: "Stop, Look, Listen (To Your Heart)" – The Stylistics
- 1971: "You Are Everything" – The Stylistics
- 1972: "People Make the World Go Round" – The Stylistics
- 1972: "Betcha by Golly, Wow" – The Stylistics
- 1972: "I'm Stone in Love with You" – The Stylistics
- 1972: "I'll Be Around" – The Spinners
- 1972: "Could It Be I'm Falling in Love" – The Spinners
- 1973: "I'm Doing Fine Now" – New York City (R&B band)
- 1973: "One of a Kind (Love Affair)" – The Spinners
- 1973: "Ghetto Child" – The Spinners
- 1973: "Break Up to Make Up" – The Stylistics
- 1973: "Rockin' Roll Baby" – The Stylistics
- 1974: "You Make Me Feel Brand New" – The Stylistics
- 1974: "Mighty Love (Part I)" – The Spinners
- 1974: "Then Came You" – The Spinners (with Dionne Warwick)
- 1975: "They Just Can't Stop It (The Games People Play)" – The Spinners
- 1976: "The Rubberband Man" – The Spinners
- 1979: "Are You Ready for Love" – Elton John (with The Spinners)
- 1979: "Mama Can't Buy You Love" – Elton John
- 1980: Dee Dee Bridgewater. - Dee Dee Bridgewater
- 1981: "Silly" – Deniece Williams
- 1982: "It's Gonna Take a Miracle" – Deniece Williams
- 1990: "I Don't Have the Heart" – James Ingram
