= Avco Records =

American record label

- Parent company: Avco (1968-1975)
- Founded: 1968 (as Avco Embassy Records)
- Founder: Hugo Peretti; Luigi Creatore; Joseph E. Levine
- Defunct: 1978
- Status: Filed for bankruptcy & sold to Amherst Records.
- Distributor(s): Self-distributed
- Genre: various
- Country of origin: United States
- Location: New Jersey

Avco Records was a record label started by music producers/composers Hugo Peretti and Luigi Creatore together with film and TV producer Joseph E. Levine in 1968 as Avco Embassy Records.

== History ==
Hugo and Luigi had previously worked together from the late 1950s for a number of labels, including Mercury, Roulette, and RCA Victor, where they were involved with acts such as Elvis Presley, the Tokens, and Sam Cooke. Levine was the head of Avco Embassy Pictures following a long career in the film industry.

Avco's best-known artists were the R&B/soul groups the Stylistics, who had a series of major hits in the pop and R&B charts mainly produced by Thom Bell, and Little Anthony & the Imperials. One of the most memorable albums recorded for Avco was 1975's Disco Baby by top producer/arranger/writer Van McCoy. This featured the classic disco hit "The Hustle", a million-seller that topped both the Billboard Hot 100 and the R&B chart, as well as charts worldwide (#3 in the UK). The release was the company's only Number 1 success in the US, although the Stylistics' "You Make Me Feel Brand New" stayed at #2 for two weeks in the Hot 100 in 1974. In the UK, the same group's "Can't Give You Anything (But My Love)" was a #1 hit in mid-1975.

Early on, the other artists released on the label covered a wide range of music. Of the many soul acts on their roster, they included Donnie Elbert, the Softones, Maxine Brown, Chocolate Syrup, Limmie & the Family Cookin'. Pop song stylist turned actress and talk show hostess Della Reese had a disco-styled outing on the label with "If It Feels Good".

The label was named simply Avco Records when the 'Embassy' part was dropped in 1971. In 1976, with Avco deciding to exit the record business, Hugo & Luigi bought out the label & renamed it to H&L Records. In 1978, H&L Records filed for bankruptcy, soon after opening their own new studios in Englewood Cliffs, New Jersey. In 1984, Amherst Records of Buffalo, New York, acquired the Avco/H&L Records catalog.
