= Pick of the Litter (The Spinners album) =

Studio album by The Spinners
- Released: August 1975
- Studio: Sigma Sound, Philadelphia, Pennsylvania
- Genre: R&B
- Length: 33:49
- Label: Atlantic
- Producer: Thom Bell

The Spinners chronology
Spinners Live! (1975)	Pick of the Litter (1975)	Happiness Is Being with the Spinners (1976)

The Spinners studio albums chronology
New and Improved (1974)	Pick of the Litter (1975)	Happiness Is Being with the Spinners (1976)

Professional ratings
Review scores
Source	Rating
AllMusic	4.5/5 stars
Christgau's Record Guide	A−
Tom Hull – on the Web	B+

Pick of the Litter is the sixth studio album by American R&B group The Spinners, released in August 1975 on the Atlantic label. The album was produced by Thom Bell and recorded at Sigma Sound Studios in Philadelphia.

== History ==
Pick of the Litter is generally considered the last of the quartet of classic Bell-produced studio albums the Spinners released between 1973 and 1975, and to mark the end of the most creative phase of the group’s career – while future releases would have memorable moments, contemporary critical opinion is that none of the group’s later material matches the enduring quality and top-notch consistency of these four albums.

Pick of the Litter became the Spinners’ highest placing album on the Billboard 200, reaching number eight; however it was the group’s first Atlantic album to miss the top of the R&B albums chart, peaking at number two. The album includes the distinctive "Games People Play", one of the group’s signature songs, which became their fifth single to top the R&B chart and a top 5 hit on the Billboard singles chart. The second single "Love or Leave" also made the R&B top 10.

Although not credited on the album sleeve, "Just as Long as We Have Love" includes vocal contributions from Dionne Warwick.

== Track listing ==
Side one
No.	Title	Writer(s)	Length
1.	"Honest I Do"	Sherman Marshall, Philip Pugh, Thom Bell	4:00
2.	"I Don't Want to Lose You"	Linda Creed, Bell	3:42
3.	"Love or Leave"	Bruce Hawes, Joseph B. Jefferson, Charles Simmons	4:59
4.	"Sweet Love of Mine"	Vinnie Barrett, Bobby Eli	4:20

Side two
No.	Title	Writer(s)	Length
5.	"All That Glitters Ain't Gold"	Philip Terry, Theodore Life, Talmadge Conway	3:47
6.	"You Made a Promise to Me"	Hawes, Jefferson, Simmons	3:56
7.	"Games People Play"	Hawes, Jefferson, Simmons	4:41
8.	"Just as Long as We Have Love"	Barrett, Hawes	4:06

== Personnel ==
- Billy Henderson, Bobby Smith, Philippé Wynne, Henry Fambrough, Pervis Jackson – vocals
- Barbara Ingram, Carla Benson, Evette Benton – backing vocals
- MFSB – strings, horns
- Tony Bell, Bobby Eli, Don Murray – guitars
- Thom Bell – keyboards
- Bob Babbitt – bass guitar
- Andrew Smith – drums
- Larry Washington – congas, bongos
- Dionne Warwick – vocals on "Just as Long as We Have Love" (uncredited)

== Charts ==
Chart (1975)	Peak
U.S. Billboard Top LPs	8
U.S. Billboard Top Soul LPs	2

Singles

Year	Single	Peak chart positions		
Year	Single	US	US R&B	US A/C
1975	"Games People Play"	5	1	2
1975	"Love or Leave"	36	8	—
