= Happiness Is Being with the Spinners =

Studio album by The Spinners
- Released: July 1976
- Studio: Sigma Sound, Philadelphia, Pennsylvania; Kaye-Smith Studios, Seattle, Washington
- Genre: R&B
- Length: 35:36
- Label: Atlantic
- Producer: Thom Bell

The Spinners chronology
Pick of the Litter (1975)	Happiness Is Being with the Spinners (1976)	Yesterday, Today, & Tomorrow (1977)

Professional ratings
Review scores
Source	Rating
Allmusic	2.5/5 stars
Christgau's Record Guide	B−
Tom Hull – on the Web	B+

Happiness Is Being with the Spinners is the seventh studio album recorded by American R&B group The Spinners, released in July 1976 on the Atlantic label. It was produced by Thom Bell and recorded at Sigma Sound Studios in Philadelphia and Kaye-Smith Studios in Seattle.

== History ==
The album reached the top ten of the R&B albums chart, their last to do so, peaking at number five. It also reached #25 on the Billboard 200. The single edit version of the seven-minute "The Rubberband Man" became the group's sixth and final R&B chart-topper and peaked at number two on the Billboard Hot 100. It also reached #16 on the UK Singles Chart. Another single, "Wake Up Susan", had moderate success on the charts.

== Track listing ==
Songs written by Joseph B. Jefferson, Bruce Hawes, and Charles Simmons unless otherwise stated.

Side one
No.	Title	Writer(s)	Length
1.	"Now That We're Together"	Philip Terry, Talmadge G. Conway, Theodore Life	3:35
2.	"You're All I Need in Life"	LeRoy Bell, Linda Creed	4:28
3.	"If You Can't Be in Love"		3:52
4.	"The Rubberband Man"	Creed, Thom Bell	7:23

Side two
No.	Title	Writer(s)	Length
5.	"Toni My Love"		3:41
6.	"Four Hands in the Fire"		4:00
7.	"The Clown"	Michael Burton	5:08
8.	"Wake Up Susan"	T. Bell, Sherman Marshall	3:29

== Personnel ==
- Henry Fambrough, Billy Henderson, Pervis Jackson, Bobby Smith, Philippé Soul Wynne – vocals
- Carla Benson, Evette Benton, Barbara Ingram – backing vocals
- Tony Bell, Bobby Eli – guitars
- Thom Bell – keyboards, producer, arranger, conductor
- Bob Babbitt – bass guitar
- Andrew Smith – drums
- Larry Washington – percussion
- MFSB – orchestra

== Charts ==
Chart (1976)	Peak
U.S. Billboard Top LPs	25
U.S. Billboard Top Soul LPs	5

Singles

Year	Single	Peak chart positions		
Year	Single	US	US R&B	UK
1976	"Wake Up Susan"	56	11	—
1976	"The Rubberband Man"	2	1	16
