= The Rubberband Man =

Single by the Spinners

from the album Happiness Is Being with the Spinners
- B-side: "Now That We're Together"
- Released: August 1976
- Studio: Sigma Sound, Philadelphia, Pennsylvania
- Genre: Soul • funk • Philadelphia soul
- Length: 7:23 (album version); 3:33 (single edit)
- Label: Atlantic
- Songwriters: Thom Bell, Linda Creed
- Producer: Thom Bell

The Spinners singles chronology
"Wake Up Susan" (1976)	"The Rubberband Man" (1976)	"You're Throwing a Good Love Away" (1977)

Official audio
- "The Rubberband Man" on YouTube

"The Rubberband Man" is a song recorded by American vocal group the Spinners. The song, written by producer Thom Bell and singer-songwriter Linda Creed, originated because of Bell's son Mark, who was being teased by his classmates for being overweight. Intended to improve his son's self-image, the song eventually evolved from being about "The Fat Man" to "The Rubberband Man".

The last major hit by the Spinners to feature Philippé Wynne on lead vocals, "The Rubberband Man" spent three weeks at number two on the US Billboard Hot 100, number 3 on the US Cash Box Top 100 and topped the U.S. R&B chart. It also reached number 16 on the UK Singles Chart.

The song was included in the Detroit Free Press's "Detroit's 100 Greatest Songs" list, ranking 70th.

== Arrangement and structure ==
Wynne alternates between singing the verse and interjecting verbal asides and improvises the eight bars linking the chorus with the bridge. The backing singers' retort of "do-do-do-do" recalls the distinctive chorus in Stephen Stills' song "Love the One You're With."

== Instrumentation ==
Reviewing the song for AllMusic, Lindsay Planer says: "The opening clavinet and percussion establish the jaunty pace before the entry of Bell's legendarily subtle Philly strings arrangement. The tempo is punctuated by brief bursts from the horn section and a tasty piano building up to Wynne's elastic lead. There are arguably no better examples of the synergy that existed between Bell's scores and Wynne's singularly expressive delivery."

The bassline of the song is intended to mimic the sound of a rubber band. This sound was achieved by bassist Bob Babbitt, an experienced Motown session musician, by running the instrument through a device he called a "funk box."

== Later uses ==
- The song was used as the walk-on theme for Pittsburgh Pirates closing pitcher Kent Tekulve beginning in 1979.
- Performed by Lynda Carter twice on TV in 1980: during her first (of five) Lynda Carter Special, and in an episode of The Muppet Show accompanied by a band of Rubberband Men Muppets.
- The song also appears in the 1981 movie Stripes.
- "The Rubberband Man" was used on the TV show Suits in the 2012 episode "Discovery".
- In 2018, the song was featured in the Marvel Cinematic Universe film Avengers: Infinity War. Star-Lord (Chris Pratt) sings it to the mostly non-receptive Guardians of the Galaxy. The song was chosen by executive producer and director of the Guardians trilogy James Gunn, and it enjoyed a surge in popularity as a result of its use.
- From 2004–2007 in several back-to-school advertising campaigns for OfficeMax, the song Rubberband Man was used as the theme for The 'Rubberband Man', a character played by actor Eddie Steeples, who would happily distribute school / office supplies to surprised and somewhat disappointed children or thankful office employees. In one commercial, Steeple's character has lost his rubber ball, and the commercial documents his search for the missing ball. At that time, Steeples was popular portraying the character of Darnell "Crab Man" Turner on the television sitcom My Name Is Earl.
- The song was featured in the CBS sitcom Young Sheldon in the final episode of the series. It played right before Sheldon Cooper was baptized.
- The song was covered on the 2010 album Zodiac by Electric Six.

== Personnel ==
- Lead vocals: Philippé Wynne
- Background vocals: Bobby Smith, Pervis Jackson, Henry Fambrough and Billy Henderson
- Additional background vocals: the Sigma Sweethearts (Barbara Ingram, Carla L. Benson and Yvette Benton)
- Instrumentation: MFSB:
  - Thom Bell: keyboards
  - Tony Bell, Bobby Eli: guitars
  - Bob Babbitt: bass guitar, funk box
  - Andrew Smith: drums
  - Larry Washington: percussion
- Produced, arranged and conducted by Thom Bell

== Charts ==
=== Weekly charts ===
Chart (1976–1977)	Peak Position
Canada Top Singles (RPM)	7
Australia (ARIA)	20
UK Singles Chart (The Official Charts Company)	16
US Billboard Hot 100	2
US Billboard Hot Soul Singles	1
US Cash BoxTop 100	3

=== Year-end charts ===
Chart (1976)	Rank
Canada Top Singles (RPM)	92
US Cash BoxTop 100	24

Chart (1977)	Rank
Canada Top Singles (RPM)	101
US Billboard Hot 100	81

== Certifications ==
Region	Certification	Certified units/sales
United Kingdom (BPI)	Silver	200,000^{‡}
^{‡} Sales+streaming figures based on certification alone.
