= On My Own (Patti LaBelle and Michael McDonald song) =

1986 duet written by Burt Bacharach and Carole Bayer Sager

Single by Patti LaBelle and Michael McDonald

from the album Winner in You
- B-side: "Stir It Up"
- Released: February 23, 1986
- Recorded: 1985
- Genre: Pop
- Length: 4:50
- Label: MCA
- Songwriters: Burt Bacharach; Carole Bayer Sager
- Producers: Burt Bacharach; Carole Bayer Sager

Patti LaBelle singles chronology
"Stir It Up" (1985)	"On My Own" (1986)	"Oh, People" (1986)

Michael McDonald singles chronology
"No Lookin' Back" (1985)	"On My Own" (1986)	"Sweet Freedom" (1986)

Music video
- "On My Own" on YouTube

"On My Own" is a duet by American singers Patti LaBelle and Michael McDonald. It was written and produced by Burt Bacharach and his then-wife Carole Bayer Sager and originally recorded by singer Dionne Warwick for inclusion on her album Friends (1985). The song was eventually recorded by LaBelle and McDonald for her eighth studio album, Winner in You (1986). It was released as the album's lead single on March 22, 1986, by MCA Records. Lyrically, "On My Own" was based on a relationship that had reached its end with both parties going their separate ways in a melancholy state with the occasional option of coming back together again one day.

The song was initially not intended to be a duet at all, but LaBelle decided to invite McDonald to help her turn the song into one, as she stated: "The song was sent to me and I did a version of it but somehow it just didn't quite work. We were going over things I'd done and we talked about turning it into a duet. Someone asked, 'If you could do it with anyone, who would you sing it with?', and Michael was my first choice."

The two performers were in separate cities when they recorded their individual parts, which were then "married" during mixing. This was reflected in the music video produced to promote the song, which depicted LaBelle and McDonald performing the song simultaneously on different coasts. The singers were shown on separate sides of a split screen, each singing the song while walking through apartments that had identical layouts but different decor and furniture. The views from their respective porches, where they finished the song, made clear their separation by the continent.

== Commercial performance ==
"On My Own" became the most successful single ever for both singers as it reached number one on the Billboard Hot 100 for three weeks. The song also reached the number-one spot on the Hot Black Singles chart (for four weeks) and number two on the Hot Adult Contemporary chart. In the United Kingdom, the song peaked at number two on the UK Singles Chart and has been certified gold by the British Phonographic Industry (BPI), becoming the 22nd best-selling single of 1986 in the country.

== Personnel ==
- Patti LaBelle, Michael McDonald: vocals
- Burt Bacharach: acoustic piano
- Greg Phillinganes: Yamaha DX7
- David Foster, Peter Wolf: synthesizers
- Dann Huff: guitars
- Neil Stubenhaus: bass
- Carlos Vega: drums
- Paulinho da Costa: percussion
- The Sweeties (Carla Benson, Evette Benton and Barbara Ingram), Clydene Jackson, Julia Tillman, Maxine Willard: backing vocals

Frank DeCaro: music contractor

== Charts ==
=== Weekly charts ===
Weekly chart performance for "On My Own"
Chart (1986)	Peak position
Australia (Kent Music Report)	12
Austria (Ö3 Austria Top 40)	20
Belgium (Ultratop 50 Flanders)	3
Canada (The Record)	2
Canada Top Singles (RPM)	1
Canada Adult Contemporary (RPM)	2
Europe (European Hot 100 Singles)	10
Ireland (IRMA)	1
Netherlands (Dutch Top 40)	2
Netherlands (Single Top 100)	1
New Zealand (Recorded Music NZ)	4
Sweden (Sverigetopplistan)	15
UK Singles (Official Charts)	2
US Billboard Hot 100	1
US Adult Contemporary (Billboard)	2
US Dance Singles Sales (Billboard)	1
US Hot R&B/Hip-Hop Songs (Billboard)	1
US Cash Box Top 100	1
US Black Contemporary Singles (Cash Box)	1
West Germany (GfK)	18

=== Year-end charts ===
Year-end chart performance for "On My Own"
Chart (1986)	Position
Australia (Kent Music Report)	88
Belgium (Ultratop 50 Flanders)	13
Canada Top Singles (RPM)	6
Europe (European Hot 100 Singles)	58
Netherlands (Dutch Top 40)	26
Netherlands (Single Top 100)	41
New Zealand (RIANZ)	24
UK Singles (OCC)	22
US Billboard Hot 100	4
US Adult Contemporary (Billboard)	9
US 12-inch Singles Sales (Billboard)	5
US Hot Black Singles (Billboard)	1
US Cash Box Top 100	10
US Black Contemporary Singles (Cash Box)	8

== Certifications ==
Certifications for "On My Own"
Region	Certification	Certified units/sales
United Kingdom (BPI)	Silver	250,000^{^}
United States (RIAA)	Gold	1,000,000^{^}
^{^} Shipments figures based on certification alone.

== Reba McEntire version ==
"On My Own"

Single by Reba McEntire Featuring Martina McBride, Linda Davis and Trisha Yearwood

from the album Starting Over
- B-side: "Read My Mind"
- Released: September 16, 1995
- Genre: Country
- Length: 4:34
- Label: MCA Nashville
- Songwriters: Burt Bacharach; Carole Bayer Sager
- Producers: Tony Brown; Reba McEntire

Reba McEntire Featuring Martina McBride, Linda Davis and Trisha Yearwood singles chronology
"And Still" (1995)	"On My Own" (1995)	"Ring on Her Finger, Time on Her Hands" (1995)

In September 1995, country entertainer Reba McEntire released a cover version of the song as the first single from her album Starting Over. Her version, featuring guest vocals from Martina McBride, Linda Davis and fellow MCA labelmate Trisha Yearwood, peaked at number 20 on Hot Country Singles & Tracks chart, although only McEntire received chart credit for it. Its music video was directed by Dominic Orlando and was filmed on the Chaplin Stage.

The four artists performed the song at the 1995 Country Music Association Awards, and again at the 1996 Academy of Country Music Awards.

=== Charts ===
Chart performance for "On My Own"
Chart (1995)	Peak position
Canada Country Singles (RPM)	22
US Hot Country Songs (Billboard)	20
