= The Best of Spinners (1978 album) =

Greatest hits album by The Spinners
- Released: 1978
- Recorded: Various sessions from 1970 to 1977
- Studio: Kaye–Smith Studios, Seattle, Washington, US; Sigma Sound, Philadelphia, Pennsylvania, US
- Genre: Soul
- Language: English
- Label: Atlantic
- Producer: Thom Bell

The Spinners chronology
8 (1977)	The Best of Spinners (1978)	From Here to Eternally (1979)

The Spinners compilations chronology
Smash Hits (1977)	The Best of Spinners (1978)

The Best of Spinners is a 1978 greatest hits album from Philly soul vocal group The Spinners, released on Atlantic Records.

== Recording and release ==
This is the second domestic Spinners compilation (after a 1977 British compilation, Smash Hits) and includes recordings from a series of successful albums produced by Thom Bell for Atlantic Records in the 1970s. A previous compilation by the same name from 1973 collects the group's first singles and tracks from their two Motown albums. By 1977, vocalist Philippé Wynne left the group for a solo career and to work in the music business, leading to a commercial decline for the group and a pair of less successful albums in 1977. This compilation came at the end of their collaboration with Bell: they would record the 1979 release From Here to Eternally with him, as well as a few tracks for his film The Fish That Saved Pittsburgh, but the group enlisted a different producer for their disco release Dancin' and Lovin' later that year.

== Reception ==
The editors of AllMusic Guide scored this compilation 4.5 out of five stars, with reviewer Ron Wynn calling this "a definitive work" until Atlantic released a two-disc set in the compact disc era.

== Track listing ==
1. "I'll Be Around" – 3:10
2. "How Could I Let You Get Away" – 3:45
3. "One of a Kind (Love Affair)" – 3:19
4. "Mighty Love" – 4:56
5. "Ghetto Child" – 3:47
6. "Then Came You (With Dionne Warwick)" – 3:57
7. "Sadie" – 3:30
8. "Could It Be I'm Falling in Love" – 4:12
9. "They Just Can't Stop It The (Games People Play)" – 3:28
10. "The Rubberband Man" – 3:32

== Chart performance ==
The Best of Spinners reached 56 on the R&B chart and peaked at 115 on the Billboard 200.

== See also ==
- List of 1978 albums
