= Aiming at Your Heart (song) =

- UK sleeve cover.

Single by The Temptations

from the album The Temptations
- B-side: "The Life of a Cowboy"
- Released: 1981
- Genre: R&B
- Length: 5:58 (full-length version); 3:33 (single version)
- Label: Gordy (Motown); G 7208F; Motown (UK); TMGT 1243
- Songwriters: J.B. Jefferson, C.B. Simmons, R. Roebuck
- Producer: Thom Bell

The Temptations singles chronology
"Silent Night" (1980)	"Aiming at Your Heart" (1981)	"Oh, What a Night" (1981)

"Aiming at Your Heart" is a song recorded by the American R&B group the Temptations, produced by Thom Bell, arranged by Bill Neale, written by Joseph Jefferson, Charles Simmons, and Richard Roebuck.

== Details ==
"Aiming at Your Heart" was released as the lead single from the group's 1981 self-titled album, The Temptations.

== Chart performance ==
The single peaked at No. 67 on the Billboard Hot 100. It was more successful on the Hot Soul Singles chart, reaching No. 36.

== Track listing ==
7-inch vinyl
No.	Title	Writer(s)	Length
1.	"Aiming at You Heart"	Jefferson, Simmons, Roebuck	3:33
2.	"The Life of a Cowboy"	Jefferson, Roebuck	3:34

12-inch vinyl
No.	Title	Length
1.	"Aiming at Your Heart"	5:57
2.	"The Life of a Cowboy"	3:34

== Personnel ==
=== Musicians ===
- Otis Williams, Melvin Franklin, Dennis Edwards, Glenn Leonard, Richard Street – background vocals
- Richard Street, Glenn Leonard- lead vocals
- Thom Bell – keyboards
- Bobby Eli, Bill Neale – guitars
- Bob Babbitt – bass
- Charles E. Collins – drums
- Larry B. Washington, Edward W. Shea – percussion
- Don Renaldo and His Strings and Horns – strings and horns

=== Production ===
- Bill Neale – arrangements, conductor
- Dirk Dalvin – chief engineer
- Bruce Bluestein, Rob Perkins, Rick Fisher – assistant engineer
- Tammara Bell – production coordinator
- Johnny Lee – art direction
- Terry Taylor – design
- Francesco Alexander – photography
