= 8 (Spinners album) =

Studio album by The Spinners
- Released: December 1977
- Studio: Kaye–Smith Studios, Seattle, Washington; Sigma Sound, Philadelphia, Pennsylvania
- Genre: Soul
- Length: 40:06
- Language: English
- Label: Atlantic
- Producer: Thom Bell

The Spinners chronology
Yesterday, Today, & Tomorrow (1977)	8 (1977)	The Best of the Spinners (1978)

The Spinners studio albums chronology
Yesterday, Today, & Tomorrow (1977)	8 (1978)	From Here to Eternally (1979)

8 is a studio album by American soul vocal group The Spinners, released in 1977. The recording represents a transition in the band's make-up that led to a commercial and critical decline.

== Recording and release ==
8 was recorded and released after Yesterday, Today, & Tomorrow, a studio album made up of two distinct sessions: one recorded during the making of Happiness Is Being with the Spinners in 1976, representing the last recordings with Philippé Wynne and the other with the first recordings featuring his replacement, John Edwards. Wynne departed to pursue a solo album and music business career and the remaining group continued recording with producer Thom Bell through 1978, but neither Wynn nor The Spinners would achieve the critical and commercial success they had during their run of 1970s albums. The Spinners promoted this album with a tour that included a brief residency in Los Angeles at Pantages Theater that included several fellow soul music acts; they also did radio promotions, an album-signing event, and a string of television appearances.

== Reception ==
The editors of AllMusic Guide scored 8 two out of five stars, with reviewer Jason Elias noting that the loss of Wynne as a vocalist negatively impacted The Spinners, with their producer Bell having "no idea what to do" with Edwards; he notes that several tracks are successful, but "the bad outweighs the good here, making Spinners/8 the most problematic album Bell produced for the group".

== Track listing ==
1. "I'm Gonna Getcha" (Leroy M. Bell and Casey James) – 4:25
2. "I'm Tired of Giving" (Joseph B. Jefferson and Charles B. Simmons) – 4:11
3. "Painted Magic" (Leroy M. Bell and Thom Bell) – 4:16
4. "You Got the Love That I Need" (Sherman W. Marshall and Phillip T. Pugh) – 3:34
5. "Heaven on Earth (So Fine)" (Casey James) – 4:00
6. "Back in the Arms of Love" (Bill Lamb) – 4:36
7. "(Love Is) One Step Away" (Juanita Gordon) – 4:38
8. "Easy Come, Easy Go" (Leroy M. Bell, Thom Bell, and Casey James) – 4:26
9. "Baby I Need Your Love (You're the Only One)" (Leory M. Bell and Casey James) – 6:00

== Personnel ==
The Spinners

- John Edwards – tenor vocals (late sessions)
- Henry Fambrough – baritone vocals
- Billy Henderson – tenor vocals
- Pervis Jackson – bass vocals
- Bobby Smith – tenor vocals
- Philippe Wynne – tenor vocals (early sessions)

Additional musicians (see MFSB)

- Bob Babbitt – bass guitar
- Leroy M. Bell – guitar, arrangement on "Baby I Need Your Love"
- Anthony S. Bell – guitar, arrangement on "(Love Is) One Step Away"
- Thom Bell – keyboards, arrangement on all tracks except "(Love Is) One Step Away" and "Baby I Need Your Love", conducting, production
- Carla Benson – backing vocals
- Evette Benson – backing vocals
- Bobby Eli – guitar
- Barbara Ingram – backing vocals
- Casey James – guitar, keyboards, timpani, arrangement on "Baby I Need Your Love"
- Andrew Smith – drums
- Larry Washington – percussion

Technical personnel

- Bernie Grundman – mastering
- Win Koots – assistant engineering, mixing
- Don Murray – chief engineering, mixing
- Richard J. Stanley – typography and logo design
- Eric Porter – art direction
- Reed Ruddy – assistant engineering
- Todd Schorr – cover airbrush art

== Chart performance ==
Domestically, 8 entered the Billboard R&B chart on December 17, 1977 at 47 and peaked at 34 during a 10-week run; it reached 57 on the Billboard 200 and spent 13 weeks on the chart (it does not appear in the March 25, 1978 issue). In Canada, it topped out at 72, according to RPM.

== See also ==
- List of 1977 albums
