= The Best of the Spinners =

The Best of the Spinners is the name of several compilations, including:

- The Best of the Spinners (1973 album), released on Motown, covering 1960s singles and their first two studio albums
- The Best of the Spinners (1978 album), released on Atlantic, covering the 1970s studio albums on Atlantic produced by Thom Bell
