= Winner in You =

Studio album by Patti LaBelle
- Released: April 28, 1986
- Recorded: 1985–1986
- Studios: Studio 55, Lion Share Studios and Westlake Audio (Los Angeles, California); Conway Studios, Baby O' Recorders and Soundcastle Studios (Hollywood, California); Bill Schnee Studios, Larrabee Sound Studios and One on One Studios (North Hollywood, California); 39th Street Studios and The Hit Factory (New York City, New York)
- Genres: R&B; soul; pop
- Length: 44:48
- Label: MCA
- Producers: Nickolas Ashford; Burt Bacharach; Carole Bayer-Sager; Budd Ellison; Nick Johnson; Richard Perry; Howie Rice; Valerie Simpson

Patti LaBelle chronology
Patti (1985)	Winner in You (1986)	Be Yourself (1989)

Singles from Winner in You
- 1. "On My Own" Released: 1986; 2. "Oh, People" Released: 1986; 3. "Kiss Away the Pain" Released: 1986; 4. "Something Special (Is Gonna Happen Tonight)" Released: 1987

Winner in You is the eighth studio album by American R&B singer Patti LaBelle. It was released by MCA Records on April 28, 1986, in the United States. Recording sessions took place during 1985–1986. Production was handled by several record producers, including Burt Bacharach, Carole Bayer Sager, Nickolas Ashford, Valerie Simpson, and Richard Perry, among others.

The album peaked at number one on the US Billboard 200 chart, as well as producing the US number-one hit single "On My Own". It was LaBelle's only album to chart outside of the United States, charting in the Netherlands, New Zealand, Sweden, and the United Kingdom. To date, the album is estimated to have sold over eight million copies worldwide, becoming her best-selling album ever. Upon its release, Winner in You received moderate reviews from music critics. The album has been certified platinum by the Recording Industry Association of America (RIAA). LaBelle embarked on the Winner in You Tour from 1986 to 1987, touring Europe to promote her album.

== Release and promotion ==
=== Singles ===
The first single to be released off Winner in You was "On My Own", featuring Michael McDonald. It peaked at number one on the Billboard Hot 100, as well as the top spot of the Billboard Hot R&B Songs, and almost topped the Billboard Adult Contemporary Songs (instead reaching No. 2 on the latter chart). It also charted internationally, peaking at number two in the UK Singles Chart, number one on the Canadian Singles Chart, number one in the Dutch Singles Chart, number four in the New Zealand Singles Chart, number fifteen in the Swedish Singles Chart, and number twenty on the Austrian Singles Chart.

The second single to be released was "Oh, People". It peaked at number twenty-nine on the Billboard Hot 100 and number seven on the Billboard Hot R&B/Hip-Hop Songs. It was the second single to chart internationally, peaking at thirty-one on the Dutch Singles Chart, and number thirty-six on the New Zealand Singles Chart. The third single to be released was "Kiss Away the Pain". It was not as successful as the two prior singles, only reaching number thirteen on the Billboard Hot R&B/Hip-Hop Songs. The final single to be released was "Something Special (Is Gonna Happen Tonight)," reaching number fifty on the Billboard Hot R&B/Hip-Hop Singles. It is played twice in Sweet Liberty and over the opening credits of Outrageous Fortune.

== Critical reception ==
Professional ratings
Review scores
Source	Rating
AllMusic	3/5 stars
Robert Christgau	B

Winner in You received average reviews from critics. Ron Wynn on AllMusic gave the album three out of five stars. He claimed that Winner in You was the album that made LaBelle's solo career. Wynn wrote that he enjoyed the songs "Oh, People" and "Kiss Away the Pain". Robert Christgau gave the album a B rating, praising the duet with Michael McDonald as well as LaBelle's singing abilities. He also complimented her and her family's songwriting abilities. Christgau did not like the earlier part of the album, claiming that she "doesn't start out with such surefire goods". Overall, he says the "beats and tunes kick in till you could care less [sic] what organ she's singing through." Jim Farber of Rolling Stone gave the album a mixed review, writing that it was inconsistent. He wrote that the album was not the "hands-down winner so many anticipated," writing that none of the fast tracks have a "jump." He praised her singing ability, however, writing that it was the only thing that saved the album.

== Commercial performance ==
The album peaked at number one on the US Billboard 200 and on Billboard's Top R&B/Hip-Hop Albums chart. It spent 30 weeks on the Billboard 200 and spent 33 weeks on the R&B/Hip-Hop Albums. On June 27, 1986, Winner in You was certified Platinum by the Recording Industry Association of America (RIAA), for shipments of one million copies in the US. Winner in You attained respectable international charting. In the Netherlands, it entered at number twenty-eight on the Mega Album Top 100. In New Zealand, it entered at number ten on the Top 40 Albums. In Sweden, it entered at number seventeen on the Albums Top 60. In the United Kingdom, it entered at number thirty-four and peaked at number 30 on the UK Albums Chart.

== Track listing ==
Winner in You track listing
No.	Title	Writer(s)	Producer(s)	Length
1.	"Oh, People"	Andy Goldmark; Bruce Roberts	Richard Perry	5:19
2.	"On My Own" (with Michael McDonald)	Burt Bacharach; Carole Bayer-Sager	Bacharach; Bayer-Sager	4:50
3.	"Something Special (Is Gonna Happen Tonight)"	Howie Rice; Alan Rich	Rice; Budd Ellison	4:58
4.	"Kiss Away the Pain"	Alex Brown; Ron Kersey	Ellison; Kersey	4:28
5.	"Twisted"	Roy Freeland; Bill LaBounty	Perry	3:54
6.	"You're Mine Tonight"	Dorothy Sea Gazeley; Rice; Rich	Perry; Rice	3:38
7.	"Finally We're Back Together"	Chuck Jackson; Nick Johnson	Ellison; Johnson	5:49
8.	"Beat My Heart Like a Drum"	Steve George; John Lang; Richard Page	Perry	3:50
9.	"Sleep With Me Tonight"	Bacharach; Neil Diamond; Bayer-Sager	Bacharach; Bayer-Sager	3:44
10.	"There's a Winner in You"	Nickolas Ashford; Valerie Simpson	Ashford; Simpson	4:18
Total length:				44:48

== Personnel ==
Compiled from liner notes.

Performers and musicians

- Patti LaBelle – vocals, backing vocals (3)
- Robbie Buchanan – synthesizers (1), drum programming (1)
- Paul Fox – synthesizers (1), drum programming (1), additional synthesizers (5, 8)
- Andy Goldmark – acoustic piano solo (1)
- Burt Bacharach – acoustic piano (2, 9)
- Greg Phillinganes – Yamaha DX7 (2)
- David Foster – synthesizers (2, 9)
- Peter Wolf – synthesizers (2)
- Howie Rice – keyboards (3), guitars (3, 6), additional synthesizers (5, 8), synthesizers (6), drum programming (6), drum fills (8)
- Ron Kersey – grand piano (4), Yamaha DX7 (4), Yamaha CS-80 (4)
- Will Bryant – Oberheim OB-8 (4), Yamaha DX7 (7)
- Bill LaBounty – synthesizers (5), drum programming (5)
- Nick Johnson – acoustic piano (7), Yamaha DX7 (7)
- Steve George – synthesizers (8)
- Steve Mitchell – additional synthesizers (8)
- Randy Kerber – Yamaha DX7 (9)
- Joseph Joubert – keyboards (10)
- Paul Jackson Jr. – guitars (1)
- Dann Huff – guitars (2, 9)
- Leo Nocentelli – guitars (4), rhythm guitar (7)
- David T. Walker – guitars (4), lead guitar (7)
- Charles Fearing – guitars (5, 8)
- Michael Landau – guitars (8), lead guitar (8)
- Nathan East – bass guitar (1)
- Neil Stubenhaus – bass guitar (2)
- Le Quient Jobe – bass guitar (3)
- Freddie Washington – bass guitar (4, 7, 9)
- Carlos Vega – drums (2)
- John Robinson – drums (9)
- Chris Parker – drums (10), percussion (10)
- Nate Neblett – Simmons drums (7)
- Pat Mastelotto – drum programming (8)
- Paulinho da Costa – percussion (1, 2, 6)
- Harvey Mason – percussion (7)
- James Gadson – percussion (3), drums (4, 7)
- Terral Santiel – percussion (3, 8), drums (5)
- George Howard – saxophone solo (4)
- David I. – alto sax solo (7)
- Larry Williams – saxophones (8)
- Charles Loper – trombone (8)
- Chuck Findley – trumpet (8)
- Jerry Hey – trumpet (8), horn arrangements (8)
- Jerry Peters – horn and string arrangements (7)
- Charles Veal – concertmaster (7)
- The Sweeties (Carla Benson, Evette Benton and Barbara Ingram) – backing vocals (1, 2, 5)
- Michael McDonald – vocals (2)
- Clydene Jackson – backing vocals (2)
- Julia Tillman – backing vocals (2)
- Maxine Willard – backing vocals (2)
- Marva Barnes – backing vocals (4)
- Alex Brown – backing vocals (4), BGV arrangements (4)
- Jim Gilstrap – backing vocals (4)

Technical

- Patti LaBelle – executive producer
- Richard Perry – producer (1, 5, 6, 8)
- Burt Bacharach – producer and arrangements (2, 9)
- Carole Bayer-Sager – producer and arrangements (2, 9)
- Howie Rice – producer (3, 6)
- James "Budd" Ellison – producer (3, 4, 7), production supervisor
- Ron Kersey – producer (4)
- Nick Johnson – producer (7)
- Nickolas Ashford – producer and arrangements (10)
- Valerie Simpson – producer and arrangements (10)
- Andy Goldmark – co-producer (1)
- Bruce Roberts – co-producer (1)
- Bill LaBounty – associate producer (5)
- Steve George – co-producer (8)
- Richard Page – co-producer (8)
- Bradford Rosenberger – production coordinator (1, 6, 8)
- Frank DeCaro – production coordinator (9)
- Cheryl Dickerson – A&R manager
- Jeff Adamoff – design
- September – art direction, design
- Ann Field – illustration
- Marc Raboy – photography
- Gallin Morey Associates – management

Technical credits

- Michael Brooks – recording (1, 5, 8)
- Bill Schnee – remixing (1)
- Mick Guzauski – recording (2, 9)
- Joel Moss – recording (2)
- Hill Brin Swimmer – recording (3, 4, 7), mixing (7)
- Taavi Mote – remix engineer (3), mixing engineer (4)
- Louil Silas, Jr. – remixing (3), mixing (4)
- Ron Kersey – mixing (4)
- Don Smith – remix engineer (5, 8)
- John Arrias – recording (6)
- Norman Whitfield Jr. – remixing (6), additional engineer (6)
- Robert Biles – recording (7), mixing (7)
- Ian Eales – basic track engineer (8)
- Tim Cox – recording (10)
- Michael Hutchinson – mixing (10)
- John Boghosian – additional engineer (1, 6, 8), basic track engineer (5)
- Glen Holgiun – additional engineer (1, 5), assistant engineer (1, 5, 6, 8)
- Thom Panunzio – additional engineer (1)
- Julie Last – assistant engineer (1, 5, 8)
- Kraig Miller – assistant engineer (1, 5, 6, 8)
- Glen Kurtz – second engineer (3, 4)
- Dennis Stefani – second engineer (4)

== Charts ==
=== Weekly charts ===
Weekly chart performance for Winner in You
Chart (1986)	Peak position
Australia (Kent Music Report)	72
Dutch Albums (Album Top 100)	28
European Albums (Music & Media)	29
German Albums (Offizielle Top 100)	31
New Zealand Albums (RMNZ)	10
Swedish Albums (Sverigetopplistan)	17
UK Albums (Official Charts)	30
US Billboard 200	1
US Top R&B/Hip-Hop Albums (Billboard)	1
US Top 75 R&B Albums (Cashbox)	1
US Top 100 Albums (Cashbox)	2

=== Year-end charts ===
Year-end chart performance for Winner in You
Chart (1986)	Position
US Billboard 200	32
US Top R&B/Hip-Hop Albums (Billboard)	13

== Certifications ==
Certifications for Winner in You
Region	Certification	Certified units/sales
Canada (Music Canada)	Platinum	100,000^{^}
United States (RIAA)	Platinum	1,000,000^{^}
^{^} Shipments figures based on certification alone.
