= Beverly Hills Cop (soundtrack) =

1984 soundtrack album by various artists

Beverly Hills Cop: Original Motion Picture Soundtrack

Soundtrack album by Various artists
- Released: December 1984
- Genres: Pop rock; dance-pop; synth-pop; R&B
- Length: 39:14
- Label: MCA
- Producer: Various artists

Singles from Beverly Hills Cop
- 1. "The Heat Is On" Released: November 1984; 2. "New Attitude" Released: December 1984; 3. "Axel F" Released: March 1985; 4. "Stir It Up" Released: June 1985

Professional ratings
Review scores
Source	Rating
AllMusic	4.5/5 stars

Beverly Hills Cop: Original Motion Picture Soundtrack is the soundtrack to the 1984 action comedy film Beverly Hills Cop. It was released in December 1984 by MCA Records. The soundtrack was mastered by Greg Fulginiti and features various artists whose tracks were included in the movie plus some other tracks not included in the movie but are similar in electronic style. The instrumental title tune, "Axel F" by Harold Faltermeyer, became a worldwide hit single and has since been covered by numerous artists.

The soundtrack was reviewed by Billboard magazine in the issue dated December 15, 1984 and debuted on the US Billboard 200 the week ending January 12, 1985 at number 177. It hit number one on the US Billboard 200 album chart on June 22, 1985.

The soundtrack won a Grammy Award for Best Score Soundtrack for Visual Media in 1986. The Grammy was awarded jointly to Marc Benno, Harold Faltermeyer, Keith Forsey, Micki Free, John Gilutin, David "Hawk" Wolinski, Howard Hewett, Bunny Hull, Howie Rice, Sharon Robinson, Danny Sembello, Sue Sheridan, Russell Powell, Richard Theisen and Allee Willis.

A key song in the movie, "Nasty Girl" by Vanity 6, played during the strip club robbery scene, is not included in the soundtrack. Harold Faltermeyer's "Shoot Out" and "The Discovery" were also omitted from the original soundtrack album, but released as B-sides to the singles.

The first pressing of the soundtrack album (MCA-5547) included the song "BHC (I Can't Stop)" by Rick James. However, in December 1984, shortly after the album's release, Motown Records filed a lawsuit in federal court against Paramount Pictures. Motown, which held an exclusive recording contract with James, alleged that Paramount never secured proper authorization or legal permission to use the song, calling its inclusion "record piracy". Following the dispute, the track was pulled from the album and replaced with Rockie Robbins' "Emergency" on future pressings.

== Track listing ==
No.	Title	Writer(s)	Producer(s)	Length
1.	"New Attitude" (performed by Patti LaBelle)	Sharon Robinson; Jon Gilutin; Bunny Hull	Howie Rice; Peter Bunetta; Rick Chudacoff	4:36
2.	"Don't Get Stopped in Beverly Hills" (performed by Shalamar)	Hawk Wolinski; Howard Hewett; Micki Free	Hawk Wolinski; Howard Hewett	4:20
3.	"Do You Really (Want My Love?)" (performed by Junior)	Junior Giscombe; Glenn Nightingale	Nigel Martinez	3:44
4.	"Emergency" (performed by Rockie Robbins)	Howie Rice; Sue Sheridan	Rice	3:28
5.	"Neutron Dance" (performed by The Pointer Sisters)	Allee Willis; Danny Sembello	Richard Perry	4:12
6.	"The Heat Is On" (performed by Glenn Frey)	Keith Forsey; Harold Faltermeyer	Keith Forsey; Harold Faltermeyer	3:45
7.	"Gratitude" (performed by Danny Elfman)	Danny Elfman	Steve Bartek; Danny Elfman; Paul Ratajczak	5:04
8.	"Stir It Up" (performed by Patti LaBelle)	Willis; Sembello	Forsey; Faltermeyer	3:35
9.	"Rock 'N Roll Me Again" (performed by The System)	Marc Benno; Richard Theisen	Mic Murphy; David Frank	3:15
10.	"Axel F" (performed by Harold Faltermeyer)	Faltermeyer	Faltermeyer	3:00
Total length:				39:14

== Official score album ==
In 2016, La-La Land Records issued a limited edition album featuring the complete film score composed by Harold Faltermeyer as well as several of the songs used. The label originally planned to release it as part of a 2-disc set with the expanded Beverly Hills Cop II soundtrack, but La-La Land Records was contractually obligated to issue each album separately. In 2019, La-La Land Records released a 35th Anniversary Limited Edition album with the same tracks.

1. "Foley Finds Mikey" – 1:20
2. "Bad Guys" – 1:23
3. "Flowers" – 0:23
4. "Foley Busted" – 1:29
5. "Cops Follow Merc" – 0:43
6. "Late Dinner/Warehouse" – 2:48
7. "Shoot Out" – 1:44
8. "Customs" – 1:31
9. "The New Team" – 0:40
10. "Chase to Harrow's" – 2:42
11. "Rosewood/Foley to Gallery" – 0:57
12. "The Discovery" – 2:15)
13. "Rosewood Saves Foley/Rosewood/Foley to Mansion" – 3:10
14. "Good Guys on Grounds" – 3:14
15. "Foley Shoots a Bad Guy" – 1:22
16. "Zack Shoots" – 1:06
17. "Zack Shot" – 0:54
18. "Maitland Shot" – 0:51
19. "Shoot Out" (alternate ending) – 1:42
20. "The Discovery" (alternate) – 2:18
21. "The Discovery" (theme suite) – 2:51
22. "Zack Shot" (alternate) – 0:54
23. "Axel F" (album version) – 3:00
24. "Shoot Out" (album version) – 2:44
25. "The Heat Is On" by Glenn Frey – 3:45
26. "Neutron Dance" by The Pointer Sisters – 4:12
27. "New Attitude" by Patti LaBelle – 4:36
28. "Do You Really (Want My Love?)" by Junior Giscombe – 3:41
29. "Stir It Up" by Patti LaBelle – 3:36

== Charts ==
=== Weekly charts ===
Weekly chart performance for Beverly Hills Cop
Chart (1984–1985)	Peak position
Australian Albums (Kent Music Report)	20
Austrian Albums (Ö3 Austria)	6
Canada Top Albums/CDs (RPM)	10
Dutch Albums (Album Top 100)	18
German Albums (Offizielle Top 100)	4
New Zealand Albums (RMNZ)	18
Norwegian Albums (VG-lista)	5
Swedish Albums (Sverigetopplistan)	3
Swiss Albums (Schweizer Hitparade)	2
UK Albums (Official Charts)	24
US Billboard 200	1

=== Year-end charts ===
Year-end chart performance for Beverly Hills Cop
Chart (1985)	Position
Austrian Albums (Ö3 Austria)	25
Canada Top Albums/CDs (RPM)	27
German Albums (Offizielle Top 100)	26
Swiss Albums (Schweizer Hitparade)	12
US Billboard 200	7

== Certifications ==
Certifications for Beverly Hills Cop
Region	Certification	Certified units/sales
Canada (Music Canada)	2× Platinum	200,000^{^}
United States (RIAA)	2× Platinum	2,000,000^{^}
^{^} Shipments figures based on certification alone.

== See also ==
- List of Billboard 200 number-one albums of 1985
