= Dancin' and Lovin' =

Studio album by the Spinners
- Released: October 1979
- Studio: Blue Rock, New York City, New York, United States (rhythm tracks for "Body Language" and "Working My Way Back to You"/"Forgive Me Girl"); Columbia Recording Studios (30th Street), New York City, New York, United States (strings and horns for "Disco Ride", "Let's Boogie, Let's Dance", and "With My Eyes"); Columbia Recording Studios (B), New York City, New York, United States (strings and vocals for "Disco Ride", "Let's Boogie, Let's Dance", and "With My Eyes"); Secret Sound Studios, New York City, New York, United States (rhythm tracks and vocals for "Disco Ride", "Let's Boogie, Let's Dance", and "With My Eyes"; horns for "Body Language" and "Working My Way Back to You"/"Forgive Me Girl"); Superdisc, Inc.; East Detroit, Michigan, United States ("One, One, Two, Two, Boogie Woogie Avenue (Home of the Boogie, House of the Funk)")
- Genre: Disco
- Length: 36:38
- Language: English
- Label: Atlantic
- Producer: Will Hatcher; the Spinners; Michael Zager

The Spinners chronology
From Here to Eternally (1979)	Dancin' and Lovin' (1979)	Love Trippin' (1980)

Dancin' and Lovin' is a 1979 studio album from Philly soul vocal group the Spinners, released on Atlantic Records. This album comes after a long-time association with producer Thom Bell and marks a shift to disco, resulting in a commercial success after a short string of decline.

== Recording and release ==
The Spinners had a series of certified gold albums produced by Thom Bell for Atlantic Records in the 1970s. By 1977, vocalist Philippé Wynne had left the group for a solo career and to work in the music business, leading to a commercial decline for the group and a pair of less successful albums in 1977, followed by a greatest hits album to buoy their profile. After From Here to Eternally and a few songs on the soundtrack to Bell's film The Fish That Saved Pittsburgh, the group changed their sound to disco and enlisted a different production technique for this release in 1979. For the first time, the group produced their own music, collaborating with Will Hatcher and Michael Zager.

== Reception ==
A review in Billboard upon release recommended the album to retailers and noted that the group still retained its "vocal punch" with the addition of John Edwards replacing Philippé Wynne. The editors of AllMusic Guide scored this release three out of five stars, with reviewer Ron Wynn noting that the band's reinvention worked commercially and allowed them to briefly retire a worn-out formula of soul music, which they returned to with a fresh approach in the 1980s. In a year-end round-up for Billboard, the Spinners were 76th in the Number One Pop Album Artists for this album and 22nd in Number One Soul Album Artists for both Dancin' and Lovin' and its follow-up Love Trippin'.

== Track listing ==
1. "Disco Ride" (Jolyon Skinner, Eltesa Weathersby, and Michael Zager) – 6:24
2. "Body Language" (Ed Fox, Frank Fuchs, and Alan Roy Scott) – 6:26
3. "Let's Boogie, Let's Dance" (Doug Frank, Ed Fox, and Doug James) – 5:56
4. Medley: "Working My Way Back to You" (Sandy Linzer and Denny Randell) / "Forgive Me Girl" (Michael Zager) – 6:04
5. "With My Eyes" (Tray Christopher and Doug James) – 6:43
6. "One, One, Two, Two, Boogie Woogie Avenue (Home of the Boogie, House of the Funk)" (William Hatcher and Rickie Ross) – 5:05

== Personnel ==
The Spinners

- John Edwards – vocals, backing vocals, production on "One, One, Two, Two, Boogie Woogie Avenue (Home of the Boogie, House of the Funk)"
- Henry Fambrough – vocals, backing vocals, production on "One, One, Two, Two, Boogie Woogie Avenue (Home of the Boogie, House of the Funk)"
- Billy Henderson – vocals, backing vocals, production on "One, One, Two, Two, Boogie Woogie Avenue (Home of the Boogie, House of the Funk)"
- Pervis Jackson – vocals, backing vocals, production on "One, One, Two, Two, Boogie Woogie Avenue (Home of the Boogie, House of the Funk)"
- Bobby Smith – vocals, backing vocals, production on "One, One, Two, Two, Boogie Woogie Avenue (Home of the Boogie, House of the Funk)"

Additional musicians

- Gloria Agostini – harp on "Disco Ride", "Let's Boogie, Let's Dance", and "With My Eyes"
- The Alfred V. Brown String Section – strings on all tracks except "One, One, Two, Two, Boogie Woogie Avenue (Home of the Boogie, House of the Funk)"
- Rubens Bassini – percussion on all tracks except "One, One, Two, Two, Boogie Woogie Avenue (Home of the Boogie, House of the Funk)"
- Lorenzo Brown – percussion on "One, One, Two, Two, Boogie Woogie Avenue (Home of the Boogie, House of the Funk)"
- Danny Cahn – trumpet on all tracks except "One, One, Two, Two, Boogie Woogie Avenue (Home of the Boogie, House of the Funk)"
- Francisco Centeno – bass guitar on all tracks except "One, One, Two, Two, Boogie Woogie Avenue (Home of the Boogie, House of the Funk)"
- Gerald Chamberlain – trombone on all tracks except "One, One, Two, Two, Boogie Woogie Avenue (Home of the Boogie, House of the Funk)"
- Rodrick "P-Nut" Chandler – bass guitar on "One, One, Two, Two, Boogie Woogie Avenue (Home of the Boogie, House of the Funk)"
- Warren Covington – trombone on all tracks except "One, One, Two, Two, Boogie Woogie Avenue (Home of the Boogie, House of the Funk)"
- John Gatchell – trumpet on all tracks except "One, One, Two, Two, Boogie Woogie Avenue (Home of the Boogie, House of the Funk)"
- Lenny Hambro – tenor saxophone on all tracks except "One, One, Two, Two, Boogie Woogie Avenue (Home of the Boogie, House of the Funk)"
- Tyrone Hornaday – synthesizer on "One, One, Two, Two, Boogie Woogie Avenue (Home of the Boogie, House of the Funk)"
- Guy Hutson – bass guitar on "One, One, Two, Two, Boogie Woogie Avenue (Home of the Boogie, House of the Funk)"
- Jerry Jones – drums on "One, One, Two, Two, Boogie Woogie Avenue (Home of the Boogie, House of the Funk)"
- Steve Love – guitar on all tracks except "One, One, Two, Two, Boogie Woogie Avenue (Home of the Boogie, House of the Funk)"
- George Marge – alto saxophone on "Disco Ride", "Let's Boogie, Let's Dance", and "With My Eyes"
- Robert Millikan – trumpet on all tracks except "One, One, Two, Two, Boogie Woogie Avenue (Home of the Boogie, House of the Funk)"
- Jeff Mironov – guitar on "Disco Ride", "Let's Boogie, Let's Dance", and "With My Eyes"
- Cliff Morris – guitar on "Body Language"
- Rob Mounsey – keyboards on tracks: "Disco Ride", "Let's Boogie, Let's Dance", and "With My Eyes"
- Ronnie Nelson – drums on "One, One, Two, Two, Boogie Woogie Avenue (Home of the Boogie, House of the Funk)"
- Gerry Niewood – alto saxophone on "Body Language" and "Working My Way Back to You"/"Forgive Me Girl"
- Danny Omar – guitar on "One, One, Two, Two, Boogie Woogie Avenue (Home of the Boogie, House of the Funk)"
- Alan Raph – bass trombone on all tracks except "One, One, Two, Two, Boogie Woogie Avenue (Home of the Boogie, House of the Funk)"
- Pat Rebillot – keyboards on "Body Language" and "Working My Way Back to You"/"Forgive Me Girl"
- Tony Robertson – drums on "One, One, Two, Two, Boogie Woogie Avenue (Home of the Boogie, House of the Funk)"
- Rickie Ross – piano on "One, One, Two, Two, Boogie Woogie Avenue (Home of the Boogie, House of the Funk)"
- Allan Schwartzberg – drums on all tracks except all tracks except "One, One, Two, Two, Boogie Woogie Avenue (Home of the Boogie, House of the Funk)"
- Suniatta – electronic drums on "One, One, Two, Two, Boogie Woogie Avenue (Home of the Boogie, House of the Funk)", percussion on "One, One, Two, Two, Boogie Woogie Avenue (Home of the Boogie, House of the Funk)"

Technical personnel

- Michael Barbiero – mixing on all tracks except "One, One, Two, Two, Boogie Woogie Avenue (Home of the Boogie, House of the Funk)" at Mediasound, New York City, New York, United States
- Michael Barry – engineering assistance on "Disco Ride", "Let's Boogie, Let's Dance", and "With My Eyes" at Secret Sound Studios
- Ted Brosnan – engineering assistance on "Disco Ride", "Let's Boogie, Let's Dance", and "With My Eyes" at Columbia Recording Studios
- Jim Burgess – engineering remixing on "One, One, Two, Two, Boogie Woogie Avenue (Home of the Boogie, House of the Funk)" at Sigma Sound Studios, New York City, New York, United States
- Bob Carbone – mastering at A&M Studios, Los Angeles, California, United States
- Jason Corsaro – engineering assistance on "Disco Ride", "Let's Boogie, Let's Dance", and "With My Eyes" at Secret Sound Studios
- Bob Defrin – art direction
- Michael Ewasko – engineering assistance on "Body Language", "Working My Way Back to You"/"Forgive Me Girl" at Blue Rock Studio
- Tim Geelan – engineering on "Disco Ride", "Let's Boogie, Let's Dance", and "With My Eyes") at Columbia Recording Studios
- Darroll Gustamachio – engineering on "Disco Ride", "Let's Boogie, Let's Dance", and "With My Eyes"), Rick Rowe (tracks: "Disco Ride", "Let's Boogie, Let's Dance", and "With My Eyes" at Secret Sound Studios
- Jim Houghton – photography
- Will Hatcher – rhythm arrangement on "One, One, Two, Two, Boogie Woogie Avenue (Home of the Boogie, House of the Funk)", production on "One, One, Two, Two, Boogie Woogie Avenue (Home of the Boogie, House of the Funk)"
- Eddie Korvin – engineering on "Body Language" and "Working My Way Back to You"/"Forgive Me Girl") at Blue Rock Studio
- Jerry Love – executive production on all tracks except "One, One, Two, Two, Boogie Woogie Avenue (Home of the Boogie, House of the Funk)"
- Greg Reilly – engineering on "One, One, Two, Two, Boogie Woogie Avenue (Home of the Boogie, House of the Funk)" at Superdisc
- Ken Robertson – engineering assistance on "Disco Ride", "Let's Boogie, Let's Dance", and "With My Eyes" at Columbia Recording Studios
- Ed Sullivan – engineering assistance on "Disco Ride", "Let's Boogie, Let's Dance", and "With My Eyes" at Secret Sound Studios
- Rickie Ross – rhythm arrangement on "One, One, Two, Two, Boogie Woogie Avenue (Home of the Boogie, House of the Funk)"
- Jeni Taylor – engineering assistance on "One, One, Two, Two, Boogie Woogie Avenue (Home of the Boogie, House of the Funk)" at Superdisc
- Craig Winterson – mixing assistance at Mediasound on all tracks except"One, One, Two, Two, Boogie Woogie Avenue (Home of the Boogie, House of the Funk)", Greg Mann on all tracks except "One, One, Two, Two, Boogie Woogie Avenue (Home of the Boogie, House of the Funk)"
- Michael Zager – arrangement, conducting, and production on all tracks except "One, One, Two, Two, Boogie Woogie Avenue (Home of the Boogie, House of the Funk)"

== Chart performance ==
Dancin' and Lovin' was the most commercially successful Spinners album in several years, reaching 11 on the R&B chart and peaking at 32 on the Billboard 200. Additionally, they made their only appearance on Australian charts, topping out at 87. Furthermore, the single releases of "Working My Way Back to You" and "Forgive Me Girl" reached two on the pop charts and six on the R&B charts respectively. Jet included Dancin' and Lovin' in their Soul Brothers Top 20 Albums three times in 1980, reaching 18 on March 20, 20 on April 3, and finally 13 on April 10.

== See also ==
- List of 1979 albums
