= Michael Zager =

American musician and record producer (born 1943)

- Born: 3 January 1943 (age 82); Passaic, New Jersey, U.S.
- Occupations: Musician; record producer; composer
- Notable work: "Let's All Chant"

Michael Zager (born January 3, 1943) is an American record producer, composer, and arranger of original music for commercials, albums, network television, and theme music for films. He teaches music at Florida Atlantic University. Zager was a member of jazz rock band Ten Wheel Drive from 1968 to 1973.

== Music career ==
Zager has produced for artists such as Whitney Houston, Cissy Houston, Peabo Bryson, Luther Vandross, Deniece Williams, Jennifer Holliday, Joe Williams, Arturo Sandoval, Herb Alpert, Olatunji, and The Spinners. Zager also produced for R&B artist Street Corner Symphony (1975), Marilyn Chambers (1976), Andrea True (1977), Dee Edwards (1980), Take Five (1981), and Elusion (1981). He also co-wrote the Patti Day song "Right Before My Eyes" with Alexandra Forbes.

In 1978, the Michael Zager Band had a popular disco anthem with "Let's All Chant".

Between 1979 and 1981, Zager composed new bridges for the Spinners' cover versions of three 1960s and 1970s hits, each of which was billed as a medley with the original hit:

- "Forgive Me, Girl", paired with a cover of the Four Seasons' "Working My Way Back to You", from the 1979 album Dancin' and Lovin' – (No. 2 US Billboard Hot 100 in March–April 1980; No. 1 UK Singles Chart)
- "I've Loved You for a Long Time", paired with a cover of Sam Cooke's "Cupid," from the 1980 album Love Trippin' – (No. 4 US Hot 100 in July–August 1980; No. 4 UK)
- "Nothing Remains the Same", paired with a cover of the Carpenters' "Yesterday Once More," from the 1981 album Labor of Love – (No. 52 US Hot 100 in March 1981; did not chart in the UK)

== Appointments ==
Zager graduated from University of Miami and the Mannes College of Music of The New School. He later taught at the Mannes College of Music.

During the summers of 2006 and 2008 Zager taught at the College of Music at Payap University in Chiang Mai, Thailand.

He holds the positions of the Dorothy F. Schmidt Eminent Scholar in Performing Arts and professor of music at Florida Atlantic University in Boca Raton, Florida.

He is the author of Writing Music for Television and Radio Commercials (A Manual for Composers and Students) and Music Production: For Producers, Composers, Arrangers, and Students, both published by Scarecrow Press.

== Discography ==
=== Studio albums ===
Year	Album	Label	US 200
1978	Let's All Chant	Private Stock Records	120
1978	Life's a Party	Columbia Records	—
1980	Zager	Columbia Records	—
"—" denotes releases that did not chart.

=== Singles ===
Year	Single	Peak chart positions			
Year	Single	US Pop	US Dance	US R&B	UK
1976	"Do It with Feeling" (with Peabo Bryson)	94	3	25	―
1977	"Let's All Chant"	36	1	15	8
1978	"Life's a Party"	―	―	―	―
1978	"Soul to Soul"	―	―	―	―
1978	"Love Express"	―	1	―	―
1978	"You Don't Know a Good Thing"	―	―	―	―
1978	"Music Fever"	―	―	―	―
1980	"Don't Sneak on Me"	―	―	―	―
1981	"Dr. Rhythm"	―	―	―	―
1984	"Shot in the Dark"	―	24	―	―
1986	"Like a Tiger"	―	27	―	―
"—" denotes releases that did not chart or were not released in that territory.

== See also ==
- List of Billboard number-one dance club songs
- List of artists who reached number one on the U.S. Dance Club Songs chart
