= Love Trippin' =

Studio album by the Spinners
- Released: May 27, 1980
- Studio: Mediasound, New York City, New York, US
- Genre: Soul
- Length: 39:00
- Language: English
- Label: Atlantic
- Producer: Michael Zager

The Spinners chronology
Dancin' and Lovin' (1979)	Love Trippin' (1980)	Labor of Love (1981)

Love Trippin' is a 1980 studio album from rhythm and blues vocal group the Spinners, released on Atlantic Records. This album comes after a shake-up in the band's sound, shifting from their Philly soul roots and a series of successful albums produced by Thom Bell to a disco sound recorded with several New York-based jazz musicians on 1979's Dancin' and Lovin'. That album's producer Michael Zager returned for this release which was a modest commercial and critical success and brought the musicians back to a more familiar soul sound.

== Reception ==
A review in Orange Coast by Keith Tuber praised the album for returning to the band's roots and avoiding "ill-fated" disco. The editors of AllMusic scored this release three out of five stars, with reviewer Jason Ankeny opining that Zager's production was appropriate to bring the group's sound into the 1980s and they were wise to not lean too heavily into disco at the end of that genre's commercial success, but the music is mediocre, featuring "duds" and that this release began a decline in the band's quality in the coming decade. In a year-end round-up for Billboard, the Spinners were 22nd in Number One Soul Album Artists for both Dancin' and Lovin' and Love Trippin'.

== Track listing ==
1. "Love Trippin'" (Deniece Williams and Michael Zager) – 4:11
2. "Heavy on the Sunshine" (Denny Henson) – 3:39
3. "Medley: "Cupid"/"I've Loved You for a Long Time" (Sam Cooke / Michael Zager) – 5:35
4. "I Just Want to Be with You" (Alvin Fields and Michael Zager) – 3:29
5. "Streetwise" (Victor Davis and Phil Vear) – 3:41
6. "I Just Want to Fall in Love" (William Hatcher, Danny Omar, and Rickie Ross) – 3:52
7. "Now That You're Mine Again" (Michael Zager) – 4:27
8. "Split Decision" (Doug James, Chip Orton, and Eltesa Weathersby) – 3:32
9. "I'm Takin' You Back" (Larry LaFalce, Ed Fox, and Alan Roy Scott) – 3:18
10. "Pipedream" (Ed Fox and Alan Roy Scott) – 3:16

== Personnel ==
The Spinners

- John Edwards – vocals; backing vocals; lead vocals on "Love Trippin'" "Heavy on the Sunshine", "Cupid"/"I've Loved for a Long Time", "Now That You're Mine Again", and "I'm Takin' You Back"
- Henry Fambrough – vocals, backing vocals, lead vocals on "Heavy on the Sunshine" and "I Just Want to Be with You"
- Billy Henderson – vocals, backing vocals
- Pervis Jackson – vocals, backing vocals
- Bobby Smith – vocals, backing vocals, lead vocals on "Pipedream"

Additional musicians

- The Alfred V. Brown String Section – strings
- Rubens Bassini – percussion
- Michael Brecker – lead solo on "Now That You're Mine Again"; tenor saxophone on "Love Trippin'", "Heavy on the Sunshine", "Streetwise", "Now That You're Mine Again", "I'm Takin' You Back", flute on "Love Trippin'", "Heavy on the Sunshine", "Streetwise", "Now That You're Mine Again", and "I'm Takin' You Back"
- Sam Burtis – trombone on "Cupid"/"I've Loved for a Long Time", "I Just Want to Fall in Love", and "Split Decision"
- Dave Carey – vibraphone
- Francisco Centeno – bass guitar
- Raymond Chew – keyboards on "Love Trippin'", "Cupid"/"I've Loved for a Long Time", "I Just Want to Fall in Love", "Now That You're Mine Again", "Split Decision" and "I'm Takin' You Back"
- Ronnie Cuber – baritone saxophone on "Cupid"/"I've Loved for a Long Time", "I Just Want to Fall in Love", and "Split Decision"
- Cornell Dupree – guitar on "Love Trippin'", "Cupid"/"I've Loved for a Long Time", "I Just Want to Fall in Love", "Now That You're Mine Again", "Split Decision", and "I'm Takin' You Back"
- Jon Faddis – flugelhorn on "Streetwise" and "Now That You're Mine Again", trumpet on "Streetwise" and "Now That You're Mine Again"
- Randy Brecker – flugelhorn on "Love Trippin'", "Heavy on the Sunshine", "Streetwise", "Now That You're Mine Again", and "I'm Takin' You Back"; trumpet on "Love Trippin'", "Heavy on the Sunshine", "Streetwise", "Now That You're Mine Again", and "I'm Takin' You Back"
- John Gatchell – flugelhorn on "Love Trippin'" "Heavy on the Sunshine", "Cupid"/"I've Loved for a Long Time", "I Just Want to Fall in Love", "Split Decision", and "I'm Takin' You Back"; trumpet on "Love Trippin'" "Heavy on the Sunshine", "Cupid"/"I've Loved for a Long Time", "I Just Want to Fall in Love", "Split Decision", and "I'm Takin' You Back"
- Yogi Horton – drums on "Love Trippin'", "Cupid"/"I've Loved for a Long Time", "I Just Want to Fall in Love", "Now That You're Mine Again", "Split Decision", and "I'm Takin' You Back"
- Arnie Lawrence – alto saxophone on "Love Trippin'", "Heavy on the Sunshine", "Streetwise", "Now That You're Mine Again", and "I'm Takin' You Back"; trumpet on "Love Trippin'", "Heavy on the Sunshine", "Streetwise", "Now That You're Mine Again", and "I'm Takin' You Back"
- Steve Love – guitar on "Love Trippin'", "Cupid"/"I've Loved for a Long Time", "I Just Want to Be with You", and "Split Decision"
- Jimmy Maelen – percussion
- Ullanda McCullough – lead vocals on "Heavy on the Sunshine"
- Robert Millikan – flugelhorn on "Cupid"/"I've Loved for a Long Time", "I Just Want to Fall in Love", and "Split Decision"; trumpet on "Cupid"/"I've Loved for a Long Time", "I Just Want to Fall in Love", and "Split Decision"
- Jeff Mironov – guitar on "Heavy on the Sunshine" and "Streetwise"
- Cliff Morris – guitar on "Heavy on the Sunshine", "I Just Want to Be with You", "Streetwise", and "Pipedream"
- Keith O'Quinn – trombone on "Love Trippin'", "Heavy on the Sunshine", "Streetwise", "Now That You're Mine Again", and "I'm Takin' You Back"
- Pat Rebillot – synthesizer; keyboards on "Heavy on the Sunshine", "I Just Want to Be with You", "Streetwise", and "Pipedream"
- Allan Ross – alto saxophone on "Cupid"/"I've Loved for a Long Time", "I Just Want to Fall in Love", and "Split Decision"; flute on "Cupid"/"I've Loved for a Long Time", "I Just Want to Fall in Love", and "Split Decision"
- Allan Schwartzberg – drums on "Heavy on the Sunshine", "I Just Want to Be with You", "Streetwise", "Pipedream"
- John Tropea – guitar on "Love Trippin'", "Cupid"/"I've Loved for a Long Time", "I Just Want to Fall in Love", "Now That You're Mine Again", "Split Decision", and "I'm Takin' You Back"

Technical personnel

- Michael Barbiero – engineering
- Carl Beatty – engineering assistance
- Bob Defrin – art direction
- Joe Gastwirt – mastering at Frankford/Wayne Mastering Labs on "Love Trippin'" "Heavy on the Sunshine", "Cupid"/"I've Loved for a Long Time", "I Just Want to Be with You", and "Streetwise"
- Alec Head – overdub engineering
- Jim Houghton – photography
- Dennis King – mastering at Atlantic Studios on "I Just Want to Fall in Love", "Now That You're Mine Again", "Split Decision", "I'm Takin' You Back", and "Pipedream"
- Jerry Love – production
- Gene Orloff – concertmaster
- Ed Walsh – synthesizer programming
- Michael Zager – arrangement, conducting, production

== Chart performance ==
Love Trippin' reached 16 on the R&B chart and peaked at 53 on the Billboard 200, a slight dip from their last album, but far ahead of their previous two.

== See also ==
- List of 1980 albums
