= Kiss Away the Pain =

Single by Patti LaBelle featuring George Howard

from the album Winner in You
- Released: 1986
- Length: 4:31
- Label: MCA
- Songwriter(s): Alex Brown; Ron Kersey
- Producer(s): Ron Kersey; James "Budd" Ellison

Patti LaBelle singles chronology
"Oh, People" (1986)	"Kiss Away the Pain" (1986)	"Something Special (Is Gonna Happen Tonight)" (1987)

"Kiss Away the Pain" is a song by American singer Patti LaBelle featuring saxophonist George Howard. It was written by Alex Brown and Ron Kersey and recorded by LaBelle for her eighth studio album, Winner in You (1986), with production helmed by Kersey and James R. "Budd" Ellison. The song was released as a single in 1986 and peaked at number 13 on the US Billboard Hot R&B/Hip-Hop Songs, staying on the chart for 16 weeks. "Kiss Away the Pain" was originally recorded by Gladys Knight & the Pips for their 1983 album Visions but not included until that album was re-issued as an expanded edition in 2014.

== Track listing ==
Vinyl
No.	Title	Length
1.	"Kiss Away the Pain"	4:31
2.	"Kiss Away the Pain (Instrumental Version)"	4:31

== Credits and personnel ==
Credits adapted from the liner notes of Winner in You.

- Alex Brown – writer
- James R. "Budd" Ellison – producer
- Patti LaBelle – executive producer
- Ron Kersey – producer, writer

== Charts ==
Chart (1986)	Peak position
US Hot R&B/Hip-Hop Songs (Billboard)	13
