= Wynne Jammin' =

Studio album by Philippé Wynne
- Released: 1980
- Recorded: 1980
- Genre: Funk; disco
- Length: 41:50
- Label: Uncle Jam; CBS
- Producer: George Clinton, Ron Dunbar, Philippé Wynne

Philippé Wynne chronology
Starting All Over (1977)	Wynne Jammin' (1980)	Philippé Wynne (1984)

Wynne Jammin' is a studio album by American singer Philippé Wynne, the former lead singer of the Spinners. It was the second album released on the Uncle Jam/CBS label, fronted by Parliament-Funkadelic leader George Clinton and his manager Archie Ivy. The album features many musicians from the P-Funk stable.

The album was produced by George Clinton, Ron Dunbar and Philippé Wynne. Wynne Jammin' was reissued by CBS/Sony in Japan in May 1994, but quickly went out of print. The original album contained a lyric sheet.

== Critical reception ==
The New York Times wrote that "the first selection, 'Never Gonna Tell It', is a 12 1/2-minute funk jam that features extended gospel-like preaching from Mr. Wynne and some blazing electric guitar solos." LA Weekly noted that "the music comes out so natural, with no perfunctory funkiness." Newsday panned the "ordinary disco" of "We Dance So Good Together".

== Track listing ==
1. "Never Gonna Tell It" (George Clinton, Bernie Worrell) (released as a single-Uncle Jam/CBS 9900 and 12" B-side to "Freak to Freak" by the Sweat Band-Uncle Jam/CBS AS 874)
2. "Put Your Own Puzzle Together" (J. Glover, J. Dean) (released as a single- Uncle Jam/CBS ZS6 9902)
3. "You Make Me Happy (You Got the Love I Need)" (Philippé Wynne)
4. "We Dance So Good Together" (J. Glover, J. Dean)
5. "Hotel Eternity" (Gary Hudgins, Daryl Clinton, Philippé Wynne, Robert Johnson)
6. "Breakout" (Philippé Wynne)
7. "You Gotta Take Chances" (J. Glover, J. Dean)

== Personnel ==
- Brandye (Telma Hopkins, Donna Davis Sadler, Pamela Vincent, Melody McCully), Philippé Wynne, Jerome Rodgers, Robert Johnson, Ron Ford, Ray Davis, The Doc, Michael "Clip" Payne, Stevie Pannell, David Lee Chong, Jessica Cleaves, Andre Williams, Jeanette McGruder, Shirley Hayden, Chanta Payne, Cheryl James, Sheila Horne - vocals
- Mike Hampton, Bruce Nazarian, Kenny Birch, Garry Shider, Dennis Coffey, Willie "Preacher" Hampton - guitar
- Rodney Curtis, Bruce Nazarian, Donny Sterling, Frank Bryant - bass
- Tyrone Lampkin, Jerry Jones - drums
- Carl "Butch" Small, Larry Fratangelo - percussion
- Bernie Worrell, David Lee Chong - synthesizer
- Gordon Staples, Felix Resnick and the Detroit Symphony Orchestra - strings
- John Trudell, Ernie Rogers, Angelo Carlisi, Ted Jackson, Gordon Stump, Leo Harrison, Maurice Davis, Fred Boldt, Mike Sutter, Marcus Belgrave - horns
- George Clinton, Ron Dunbar, Philippé Wynne - background arrangements
- Rudy Robinson, Bernie Worrell - rhythm arrangements
- Paul Riser, Tony Camillo - string and horn arrangements
- Diem Jones - art direction
