= Games People Play (The Spinners song) =

1975 single from The Spinners

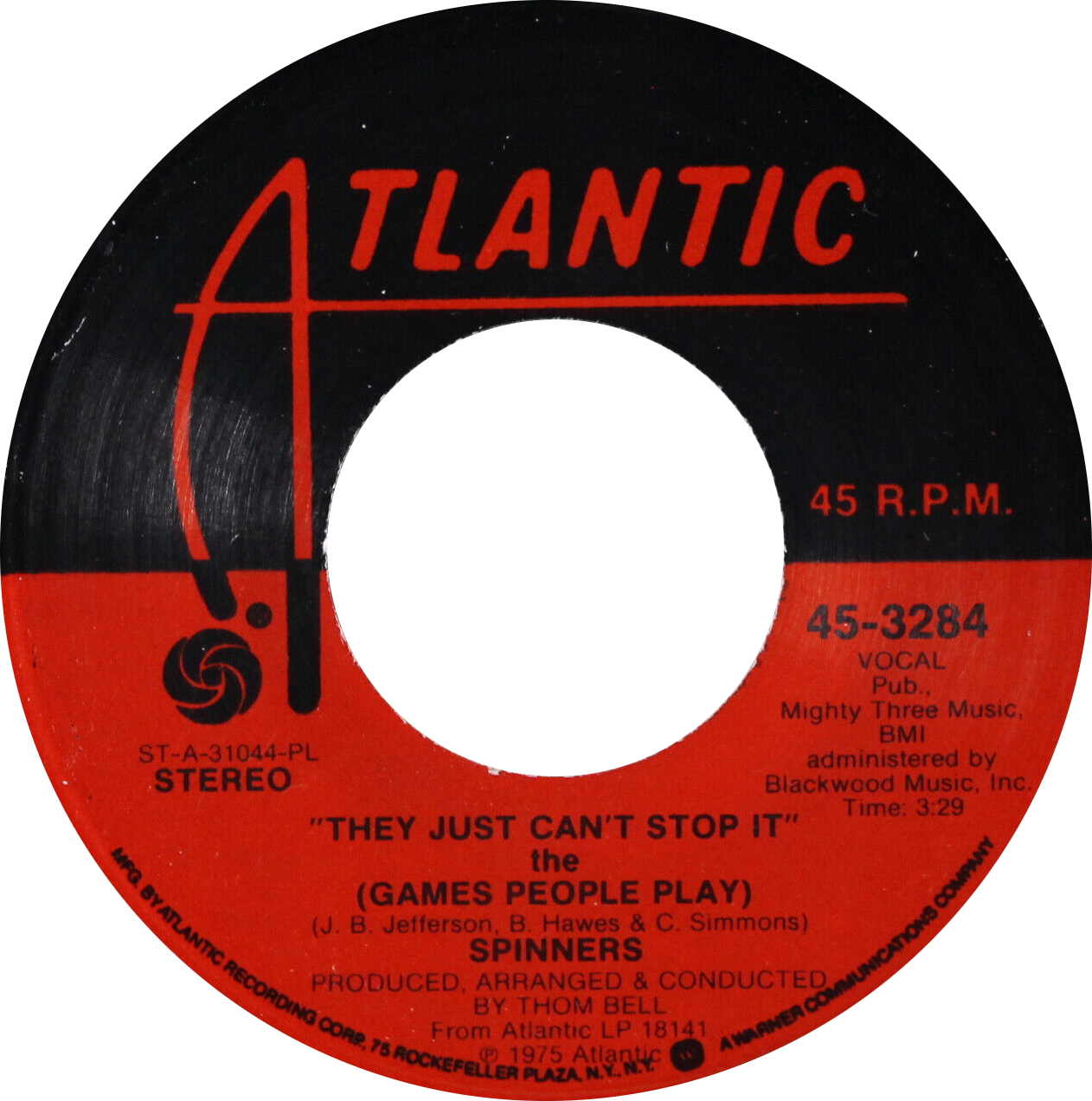
- One of side-A labels of the US single

Single by the Spinners

from the album Pick of the Litter
- B-side: "I Don't Want to Lose You"
- Released: May 1975
- Studio: Sigma Sound, Philadelphia, Pennsylvania
- Genre: Philly soul
- Length: 3:29 (7"); 4:41 (album)
- Label: Atlantic
- Songwriters: Joseph B. Jefferson, Bruce Hawes, Charles Simmons
- Producer: Thom Bell

The Spinners singles chronology
"Sadie" (1975)	"Games People Play" (1975)	"Love or Leave" (1975)

"Games People Play", also known as "'They Just Can't Stop It' The (Games People Play)", is a song recorded by the American R&B vocal group the Spinners. Released in 1975 from their Pick of the Litter album, featuring lead vocals by Bobby Smith, it was a crossover success, spending a week at number 1 on the US Hot Soul Singles chart and peaking at number 5 on the Billboard Hot 100. The song fared better on the US Cash Box Top 100, peaking at number 2. Recorded at Philadelphia's Sigma Sound Studios, the house band MFSB provided the backing. Female backing vocals on the song were performed by Carla L. Benson, Evette Benton, and Barbara Ingram, who together formed the studio backing vocal group Sweethearts of Sigma. The female lead vocal on the track is by Evette Benton. This song was an RIAA-certified million seller for the Spinners.

== Personnel ==
- Lead vocals by Bobby Smith, Pervis Jackson, and Evette Benton
  - Jackson is perhaps best remembered for his bass delivery of "12:45" in this song.
- Background vocals by Philippé Wynne, Pervis Jackson, Henry Fambrough, Billy Henderson, and the Sweethearts of Sigma: Barbara Ingram, Carla L. Benson and Evette Benton
- Instrumentation by MFSB

== Charts ==
=== Weekly charts ===
Chart (1975)	Peak position
Canadian RPM Top Singles	21
US Billboard Hot 100	5
US Billboard Easy Listening	2
US Billboard Hot Soul Singles	1
US Cash Box Top 100	2

=== Year-end charts ===
Chart (1975)	Rank
Canada	89
US Cash Box Top 100	25
