= Yesterday, Today, & Tomorrow (Spinners album) =

Studio album by the Spinners
- Released: April 1977
- Studios: Kaye–Smith Studios, Seattle, Washington, US; Sigma Sound, Philadelphia, Pennsylvania, US
- Genre: Soul
- Length: 45:35
- Language: English
- Label: Atlantic
- Producer: Thom Bell

The Spinners chronology
Happiness Is Being with the Spinners (1976)	Yesterday, Today, & Tomorrow (1977)	8 (1977)

Yesterday, Today, & Tomorrow is a studio album by American soul vocal group the Spinners, released in 1977.

== Reception ==
The editors of AllMusic Guide scored Yesterday, Today, & Tomorrow 2.5 of five stars, with reviewer Jason Elias noting that this release "drew the hitmaking ways to a screeching halt" after a string of "fulfilling and immaculately produced albums" guided by Thom Bell. He also notes differences between the sessions that led to this album, with some featuring Philippé Wynne, recorded during the making of Happiness Is Being with the Spinners and others with his replacement John Edwards.

== Track listing ==
1. "Me and My Music" (Sherman Marshall and Ted Wortham) – 4:25
2. "I Found Love (When I Found You)" (Phillip T. Pugh and Sherman Marshall) – 5:08
3. "I'm Riding Your Shadow (Down to Love)" (Bruce Hawes, Joseph Jefferson, and Charles Simmons) – 4:12
4. "You're the Love of My Life" (Michael Burton and Phil Terry) – 4:20
5. "I Must Be Living for a Broken Heart" (Joseph Jefferson and Charles Simmons) – 4:56
6. "Honey, I'm in Love with You" (Tony Bell, Leroy M. Bell, and Thom Bell) – 5:43
7. "Just to Be with You" (Phillip T. Pugh and Sherman Marshall) – 8:14
8. "You're Throwing a Good Love Away" (Sherman Marshall and Ted Wortham) – 8:38

== Personnel ==
The Spinners

- John Edwards – tenor vocals on "Honey, I'm in Love with You"
- Henry Fambrough – baritone vocals
- Billy Henderson – tenor vocals
- Pervis Jackson – bass vocals, backing vocals
- Bobby Smith – tenor vocals
- Philippé Wynne – tenor vocals except on "Honey, I'm in Love with You"

Additional musicians (see MFSB)

- Bob Babbitt – bass guitar
- Anthony S. Bell – guitar
- Thom Bell – keyboards, arrangement on all tracks except "Honey, I'm in Love with You", production
- Carla Benson – backing vocals
- Evette Benson – backing vocals
- Bobby Eli – guitar
- Barbara Ingram – backing vocals
- Andrew Smith – drums
- Larry Washington – percussion

Technical personnel

- Tony Bell – arrangement on "Honey, I'm in Love with You"
- James Gaines – assistant engineering
- Bernie Grundman – mastering at A & M Studios, Hollywood, California, United States
- Mike Hutchinson – assistant engineering
- Win Koots – assistant engineering
- Don Murray – engineering
- Richard J. Stanley – photography
- Eric Porter – art direction
- Jeffrey Stewart – assistant engineering
- Linda Tyler – assistant engineering

Mixed at Sound Labs, Los Angeles, California, United States and Kaye–Smith Studios, Seattle, Washington, United States

== Chart performance ==
Domestically, Yesterday, Today, & Tomorrow reached 26 on the Billboard 200 and eleventh place on the R&B charts. In Canada, it topped out at 36, according to RPM.

== See also ==
- List of 1977 albums
