= Stir It Up (Patti LaBelle song) =

Single by Patti LaBelle

from the album Beverly Hills Cop
- B-side: "The Discovery"
- Released: June 1985
- Genre: Dance-pop; synth-pop
- Length: 3:38
- Label: MCA
- Songwriters: Dan Sembello; Allee Willis
- Producers: Harold Faltermeyer; Keith Forsey

Patti LaBelle singles chronology
| "New Attitude" (1985) | "Stir It Up" (1985) | "On My Own" (1986) |

"Stir It Up" is a song by American singer Patti LaBelle. It was written by Dan Sembello and Allee Willis and recorded by LaBelle for the motion picture soundtrack album for the 1984 action comedy film Beverly Hills Cop; production was helmed by Harold Faltermeyer and Keith Forsey. "Stir It Up" was the second of two songs she recorded for MCA Records immediately after signing her new contract with them (following "New Attitude"). Her first full-length album for MCA, Winner in You, would follow the next year.

Released as the fourth single from the soundtrack, which was awarded the 1986 Grammy Award for Best Score Soundtrack for Visual Media, it reached number five on the US Hot R&B/Hip-Hop Songs chart. "Stir It Up" was also used as the theme song to the short-lived sitcom Stir Crazy, based on the 1980 movie. The song was later used in South Park: Post Covid at the opening.

== Music video ==
The music video features Patti LaBelle singing the track in a recording studio with session musicians. It intercuts with a young woman (Motown recording artist Desiree Coleman) running through the streets of Manhattan. She recruits other passers-by who follow her to the studio where Patti and her band are singing. The city shots were filmed in New York City.

== Duet version ==
LaBelle re-recorded "Stir It Up" alongside Joss Stone for the soundtrack to the 2005 Disney animated feature film Chicken Little. This version was produced by Mark Hammond.

== Charts ==
| Chart (1985–1986) | Peak position |
|---|---|
| US Billboard Hot 100 | 41 |
| US Hot R&B/Hip-Hop Songs (Billboard) | 5 |
