= Oh, People =

Single by Patti LaBelle

from the album Winner in You
- B-side: "Love Attack"
- Released: June 30, 1986
- Length: 5:19
- Label: MCA
- Songwriters: Andy Goldmark; Bruce Roberts
- Producer: Richard Perry

Patti LaBelle singles chronology
"On My Own" (1986)	"Oh, People" (1986)	"Kiss Away the Pain" (1986)

Music video
- "Oh, People" on YouTube

"Oh, People" is a song by American singer Patti LaBelle. It was written by Andy Goldmark and Bruce Roberts for her eighth studio album Winner in You (1986), while production was helmed by Richard Perry. Issued as the album's second single, it was released by MCA Records on June 30, 1986 in the United States. The song is a socially conscious anthem with lyrics pleading to individuals to unite and "build the world we want together."

== Chart performance ==
The song was a moderate success, reaching number 29 on the Billboard Hot 100 chart and number 7 on the Billboard R&B chart while also reaching number 26 in the United Kingdom. It also reached several European charts, peaking at number 31 in the Netherlands (AKA the Dutch singles chart) and number 36 in New Zealand.

== Track listing ==
Vinyl
No.	Title	Length
1.	"Oh, People"	4:23
2.	"Love Attack"	4:12

== Credits and personnel ==
Credits adapted from the liner notes of Winner in You.

- Patti LaBelle – executive producer
- Andy Goldmark – associate producer, writer
- Richard Perry – producer
- Bruce Roberts – associate producer, writer

== Charts ==
Chart (1986)	Peak position
Belgium (Ultratop 50 Flanders)	24
Europe (European Hot 100 Singles)	35
Netherlands (Single Top 100)	31
Germany (GfK)	32
New Zealand (Recorded Music NZ)	36
UK Singles (Official Charts)	26
US Billboard Hot 100	29
US Hot R&B/Hip-Hop Songs (Billboard)	7
