= From Here to Eternally =

Studio album by the Spinners
- Released: May 1979
- Recorded: 1978
- Studios: Sigma Sound, Philadelphia, Pennsylvania, US; Sound Labs, Hollywood, California, US; Kaye–Smith, Philadelphia, Pennsylvania, US (overdubs)
- Genre: Soul
- Length: 39:47
- Language: English
- Label: Atlantic
- Producer: Thom Bell

The Spinners chronology
The Best of the Spinners (1978)	From Here to Eternally (1979)	Dancin' and Lovin' (1979)

The Spinners studio albums chronology
8 (1977)	From Here to Eternally (1978)	Dancin' and Lovin' (1979)

From Here to Eternally is a 1979 studio album from American Philly soul vocal group the Spinners, released on Atlantic Records. This album represents their last collaboration with producer Thom Bell and marks a decline in the critical and commercial success of the group.

== Recording and release ==
The Spinners had a series of certified gold albums produced by Thom Bell for Atlantic Records in the 1970s. By 1977, vocalist Philippé Wynne had left the group for a solo career and to work in the music business, leading to a commercial decline for the group and a pair of less successful albums in 1977, followed by a greatest hits album to buoy their profile. After this album and a few songs on the soundtrack to Bell's film The Fish That Saved Pittsburgh, the group changed their sound to disco and enlisted a different producer for Dancin' and Lovin' later in 1979.

== Critical reception ==
Professional ratings
Review scores
Source	Rating
AllMusic	3/5 stars
Robert Christgau	B−
The Virgin Encyclopedia of R&B and Soul	2/5 stars

"If You Wanna Do a Dance (All Night)" was a pick of the week in Billboard, noting that "this is a new direction" for the group with "perfect timing" and noting that they started experimenting with disco on this track. Upon the album release, From Here to Eternally was also spotlit as an album pick, noting that the group's smooth vocals and signature sound are apparent, augmented by Bell's production and collaboration with LeRoy Bell and Casey James. Robert Christgau determined that "the lyrics are banal at best and the melodies often annoying."

AllMusic reviewer Jason Elias opined that the album recovered some quality from their past two studio releases, noting that while it was a commercial failure, "it features a few underrated gems and some good to great production".

== Track listing ==
1. "It's a Natural Affair" (Thom Bell and Tony Bell) – 4:02
2. "Don't Let the Man Get You" (Casey James and LeRoy M. Bell) – 5:10
3. "(A) Plain and Simple Love Song" (Frank Hooker and Vinnie Barrett) – 5:21
4. "Are You Ready for Love" (Casey James, LeRoy M. Bell, and Thom Bell) – 5:20
5. "I Love the Music" (Casey James and LeRoy M. Bell) – 5:22
6. "One Man Wonderful Band" (James "Boogaloo" Bolden and Jack Robinson) – 3:04
7. "If You Wanna Do a Dance (All Night)" (Casey James, LeRoy M. Bell, and Thom Bell) – 7:05
8. "Once You Fall in Love" (Joseph B. Jefferson and Charles Simmons) – 4:23

== Personnel ==
The Spinners

- John Edwards
- Henry Fambrough
- Billy Henderson
- Pervis Jackson
- Bobby Smith

Additional musicians (see MFSB)

- Bob Babbitt – bass guitar
- LeRoy M. Bell – guitar
- Anthony S. Bell – guitar, arrangement on "It's a Natural Affair", "Are You Ready for Love", "One Man Wonderful Band" and "If You Wanna Do a Dance (All Night)"
- Thom Bell – keyboards, synthesizer, arrangement on all tracks except "One Man Wonderful Band" and "If You Wanna Do a Dance (All Night)", conducting, production
- Charles Collins – drums, synth drums
- Bobby Eli – guitar
- Tim Gorman – synthesizer
- Casey James – guitar
- Larry Washington – percussion

Technical personnel

- Michael Guinn – production assistance
- Stephen Marchesi – cover illustration
- Don Murray – chief engineering
- Eric Porter – art direction
- Buzz Richmond – assistant engineering
- John Rosenthal – assistant engineering
- Jeffery Stewart – assistant engineering
- Wally Traugott – mastering at Capitol Mastering
- Linda Tyler – assistant engineering

This album was mixed at Producers Workshop, Hollywood, California, United States.

== Chart performance ==
From Here to Eternally was the least commercially successful Spinners album in almost a decade, reaching only 61st place on the R&B chart and peaking at 165 on the Billboard 200.

== See also ==
- List of 1979 albums
