= List of Billboard 200 number-one albums of 1985 =

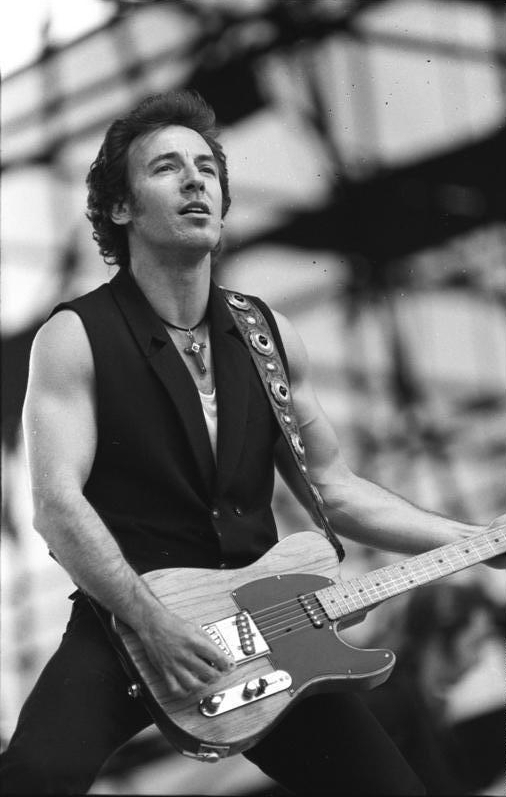
In 1985, Bruce Springsteen's Born in the U.S.A., spent the whole year inside the Top 10 (including three weeks at number one) and ended at the top of the year-end chart, helped by five singles that reached the Top 10 throughout the year, and also a world tour that covered North America, Europe and Australia.

The Billboard 200, published in Billboard magazine, is a weekly chart that ranks the highest-selling music albums and EPs in the United States. Before Nielsen SoundScan began tracking sales in 1991, Billboard estimated sales from a representative sampling of record stores nationwide, using telephone, fax or messenger service. Data were based on rankings made by the record stores of the best-selling records, not on actual sales figures.

There were fourteen number-one albums on this chart in 1985, including two releases by Prince and The Revolution: Purple Rain, which stayed at the top for two weeks in 1985, and twenty-two weeks in 1984; and Around the World in a Day, which spent three weeks at number one in June. Bruce Springsteen's Born in the U.S.A., which spent four weeks at number one in 1984, topped the chart again for three weeks, ending at the top of the 1985 year-end chart, helped by the success of his Born in the U.S.A. Tour that visited North America, Europe and Australia. Recording artist Madonna released her second studio album Like a Virgin in November 1984, reaching the top of the chart for three weeks in February 1985. The dance-pop oriented album adapted some of the sound elements of the 1970s disco group Chic, and included "Material Girl" and "Like a Virgin", the two songs that made her an icon and an international celebrity. In May, the album sold four and a half million copies, and by the end of the year it was certified six times platinum by the Recording Industry Association of America (RIAA).

British pop duo Wham! released Make It Big in 1984, spawning three number-one singles in the U.S., "Wake Me Up Before You Go-Go", "Careless Whisper" and "Everything She Wants", and selling four million copies by the end of the year. Rock singer John Fogerty released Centerfield, his first album since 1975, peaking at number one for one week in March. No Jacket Required, the third solo album by British singer-songwriter Phil Collins, spent seven non-consecutive weeks at the top, was certified quadruple platinum at the end of the year by the RIAA, and won the Album of the Year award at the 28th Grammy Awards. In 1985 a supergroup of popular musicians billed as USA for Africa or United Support of Artists for Africa, released a charity recording for famine relief efforts in Ethiopia. We Are the World, which included the title track, written by Michael Jackson and Lionel Richie and performed by forty-five vocalists, including Jackson, Ritchie, Ray Charles, Bob Dylan, Billy Joel, Cyndi Lauper, Diana Ross, Bruce Springsteen, Tina Turner and Stevie Wonder, was certified triple platinum by the RIAA, and won four awards at the 28th Grammy Awards.

British pop band Tears for Fears released their second album Songs from the Big Chair, which rocketed to the top of the charts on the strength of the singles "Everybody Wants to Rule the World" and "Shout", which both hit number one on the Billboard Hot 100. Canadian rock singer Bryan Adams released his fourth album Reckless in 1984, peaking at number one for two weeks in 1985, selling four million copies by January 1986, and earning Adams his first two Grammy nominations. Two soundtracks reached the top of the chart in 1985, the first one was the soundtrack for the action-comedy film Beverly Hills Cop, which won the Grammy Award for Best Score Soundtrack Album for a Motion Picture. The second was the soundtrack for the television series Miami Vice, which spent eight non-consecutive weeks at number one, and was certified quadruple platinum by the RIAA in 1986. Released in May 1985, Brothers in Arms was Dire Straits' breakthrough album. Supported by the groundbreaking computer-animated video of "Money for Nothing", the album spent nine weeks at the top, and sold over three million copies by the end of the year. Rock band Heart released a self-titled album that sold more than two million copies in 1985, and contained four top ten songs, including the number-one single "These Dreams".

== Chart history ==
Key
†	Indicates best performing album of 1985

Issue date	Album	Artist(s)	Label	Ref.
January 5	Purple Rain	Prince and the Revolution / Soundtrack	Warner Bros.	
January 12	Purple Rain	Prince and the Revolution / Soundtrack	Warner Bros.	
January 19	Born in the U.S.A. †	Bruce Springsteen	Columbia	
January 26	Born in the U.S.A. †	Bruce Springsteen	Columbia	
February 2	Born in the U.S.A. †	Bruce Springsteen	Columbia	
February 9	Like a Virgin	Madonna	Sire	
February 16	Like a Virgin	Madonna	Sire	
February 23	Like a Virgin	Madonna	Sire	
March 2	Make It Big	Wham!	Columbia	
March 9	Make It Big	Wham!	Columbia	
March 16	Make It Big	Wham!	Columbia	
March 23	Centerfield	John Fogerty	Warner Bros.	
March 30	No Jacket Required	Phil Collins	Atlantic	
April 6	No Jacket Required	Phil Collins	Atlantic	
April 13	No Jacket Required	Phil Collins	Atlantic	
April 20	No Jacket Required	Phil Collins	Atlantic	
April 27	We Are the World	USA for Africa	Columbia	
May 4	We Are the World	USA for Africa	Columbia	
May 11	We Are the World	USA for Africa	Columbia	
May 18	No Jacket Required	Phil Collins	Atlantic	
May 25	No Jacket Required	Phil Collins	Atlantic	
June 1	Around the World in a Day	Prince and the Revolution	Paisley Park	
June 8	Around the World in a Day	Prince and the Revolution	Paisley Park	
June 15	Around the World in a Day	Prince and the Revolution	Paisley Park	
June 22	Beverly Hills Cop	Soundtrack	MCA	
June 29	Beverly Hills Cop	Soundtrack	MCA	
July 6	No Jacket Required	Phil Collins	Atlantic	
July 13	Songs from the Big Chair	Tears for Fears	Mercury	
July 20	Songs from the Big Chair	Tears for Fears	Mercury	
July 27	Songs from the Big Chair	Tears for Fears	Mercury	
August 3	Songs from the Big Chair	Tears for Fears	Mercury	
August 10	Reckless	Bryan Adams	A&M	
August 17	Reckless	Bryan Adams	A&M	
August 24	Songs from the Big Chair	Tears for Fears	Mercury	
August 31	Brothers in Arms	Dire Straits	Warner Bros.	
September 7	Brothers in Arms	Dire Straits	Warner Bros.	
September 14	Brothers in Arms	Dire Straits	Warner Bros.	
September 21	Brothers in Arms	Dire Straits	Warner Bros.	
September 28	Brothers in Arms	Dire Straits	Warner Bros.	
October 5	Brothers in Arms	Dire Straits	Warner Bros.	
October 12	Brothers in Arms	Dire Straits	Warner Bros.	
October 19	Brothers in Arms	Dire Straits	Warner Bros.	
October 26	Brothers in Arms	Dire Straits	Warner Bros.	
November 2	Miami Vice	Soundtrack	MCA	
November 9	Miami Vice	Soundtrack	MCA	
November 16	Miami Vice	Soundtrack	MCA	
November 23	Miami Vice	Soundtrack	MCA	
November 30	Miami Vice	Soundtrack	MCA	
December 7	Miami Vice	Soundtrack	MCA	
December 14	Miami Vice	Soundtrack	MCA	
December 21	Heart	Heart	Capitol	
December 28	Miami Vice	Soundtrack	MCA	

== See also ==
- 1985 in music
- List of number-one albums (United States)
