= The Temptations (1981 album) =

Studio album by the Temptations
- Released: August 7, 1981
- Studio: Sigma Sound, Philadelphia, Pennsylvania; Kaye-Smith Studios, Seattle, Washington
- Genre: R&B; Soul; Pop
- Length: 41:03
- Label: Gordy
- Producer: Thom Bell

The Temptations chronology
Give Love at Christmas (1980)	The Temptations (1981)	Reunion (1982)

Singles from The Temptations
- 1. "Aiming at Your Heart" / "The Life of a Cowboy" Released: July 17, 1981; 2. "Oh, What A Night" / "Isn't The Night Fantastic?" Released: October 9, 1981

The Temptations is a studio album by American R&B group the Temptations, released via Motown's subsidiary label, Gordy Records on August 7, 1981. The album is the group's third album upon their return to Gordy Records after their brief stint at Atlantic Records.

== Background ==
The album is the result of the Temptations' collaboration with the critically acclaimed record producer Thom Bell, whom they had met eight years prior. The album features two original members of the group, Otis Williams and Melvin Franklin, recurring member Dennis Edwards, with then-recent members Richard Street and Glenn Leonard.

== Reception ==
Professional ratings
Review scores
Source	Rating
AllMusic	3/5 stars
The Rolling Stone Album Guide	1.5/5 stars

The album leans toward pop, which alienated them from their R&B audience. According to Craig Lytle of AllMusic, the reason why the album wasn't a huge success is that it wasn't marketed to a crossover audience.

== Chart performance ==
The album peaked at No. 119 on the Billboard 200 albums chart and No. 36 on the Top Black Albums albums chart. The only charting single from the album was the album's debut single, the uptempo R&B groove "Aiming at Your Heart" featuring Street and Leonard on lead vocals. The single peaked at No. 67 on the Billboard Hot 100. It was more successful on the Hot Soul Singles chart, reaching No. 36.

== Track listing ==
All tracks are arranged by Thom Bell, except side one, track one and side two, track five arranged by Bill Neale.

Side one
No.	Title	Writer(s)	Lead singer(s)	Length
1.	"Aiming at Your Heart"	Charles B. Simmons, Joseph B. Jefferson, Richard Roebuck	Richard Street, Glenn Leonard	5:58
2.	"Evil Woman (Gonna Take Your Love)"	Leroy M. Bell, Casey James	Dennis Edwards	3:20
3.	"The Best Of Both Worlds"	Thom Bell, Linda Creed	Leonard	3:41
4.	"Ready Willing And Able"	Alan Glass, Preston Glass, T. Bell	Edwards	3:25
5.	"Open Their Eyes"	T. Bell, Creed	Leonard	4:14

Side two
No.	Title	Writer(s)	Lead singer(s)	Length
6.	"Oh, What A Night"	T. Bell, Creed	Street	4:03
7.	"The Life of a Cowboy"	Jefferson, Roebuck	Edwards	3:33
8.	"Just Ain't Havin' Fun"	T. Bell, Creed	Edwards	4:06
9.	"What Else"	Simmons, Jefferson, Roebuck	Melvin Franklin	4:11
10.	"Your Lovin' Is Magic"	A. Glass, P. Glass, T. Bell	Street	4:05

== Personnel ==
Musicians

- The Temptations (Otis Williams, Melvin Franklin, Dennis Edwards, Richard Street, Glenn Leonard) – vocals
- Thom Bell – keyboards
- Bobby Eli, Bill Neale – guitar
- Bob Babbitt – bass guitar
- Charles Collins – drums
- Larry B. Washington, Edward W. Shea – percussion
- Don Renaldo and His Strings and Horns – strings and horns

Production

- Thom Bell – arrangements, conductor
- Bill Neale – arrangements, conductor (tracks: "Aiming At Your Heart", "Your Lovin' Is Magic")
- Dirk Dalvin – chief engineer
- Bruce Bluestein, Rob Perkins, Rick Fisher – assistant engineer
- Tammara Bell – production coordinator
- Johnny Lee – art direction
- Terry Taylor – design
- Francesco Alexander – photography

== Charts ==
Chart (1981)	Peak position
US Billboard 200	119
US Top R&B/Hip-Hop Albums (Billboard)	36
