= Andrew Smith (drummer) =

- Born: Andrew Louis Smith; August 15, 1950; Detroit, Michigan, U.S.
- Died: April 27, 2000 (aged 49) East Brunswick, New Jersey, U.S.
- Genres: Soul, R&B, Funk, Jazz
- Occupations: Drummer, producer, arranger
- Years active: 1960s–2000

Andrew Louis Smith (August 15, 1950 – April 27, 2000) was an American drummer, producer, and arranger. He was a member of The Funk Brothers, Motown Records' house band, during the label's Detroit-to-Los Angeles transition period (1968–1972). Smith's session career included playing on Gladys Knight & the Pips' Grammy-winning "Midnight Train to Georgia" (1973) and The Spinners' "The Rubberband Man" (1974).

== Early life and career ==
Born in Detroit, Michigan, Smith began his career as a session drummer at Golden World Studios, where he established professional relationships with bassist Bob Babbitt and guitarist Dennis Coffey.

In 1969, Smith was a member of the Lyman Woodard Trio and the Dennis Coffey Trio, contributing to the album Hair And Thangs (Maverick Records). He also performed in the group Scorpion with Babbitt, Ray Monette, and Mike Campbell, releasing a self-titled album on Tower Records the same year. Smith also worked on sessions at Holland–Dozier–Holland's Invictus and Hot Wax labels, including contributions to Ruth Copeland's Self Portrait album.

== Motown and the Funk Brothers ==
Smith joined the Funk Brothers around 1968, recommended by saxophonist Hank Cosby for a Stevie Wonder session. As one of the younger members of the later-era Detroit lineup, he contributed to various Motown recordings until the label's relocation to Los Angeles in 1972. He also toured as the road drummer for The Temptations during the late 1960s and early 1970s.

== Post-Motown career ==
Following Motown's relocation, Smith moved to the East Coast, where he became a session musician in New York and Philadelphia. In 1973, he played drums on Gladys Knight & the Pips' "Midnight Train to Georgia," which reached number one on the Billboard Hot 100 and won a Grammy Award for Best R&B Performance by a Duo or Group with Vocals.

In 1974, Smith worked with producer Thom Bell on sessions for The Spinners, including the gold-certified single "The Rubberband Man." Throughout the 1970s and 1980s, Smith worked with artists including Bob James, Yoko Ono, Hubert Laws, and Eric Gale. In 1980, a collection of his film scores was released on Major Records.

Smith's work as an arranger and composer included contributions to recordings by various artists during his East Coast career.

== Death and legacy ==
Smith died on April 27, 2000, in East Brunswick, New Jersey. He was posthumously acknowledged for his contributions to the Motown sound in the 2002 documentary film Standing in the Shadows of Motown.

== Selected discography ==
- Lyman Woodard Trio / Dennis Coffey Trio – Hair And Thangs (1969, Maverick Records)
- Scorpion – Scorpion (1969, Tower Records)
- Ruth Copeland – Self Portrait (Invictus/Hot Wax)
- Gladys Knight & the Pips – "Midnight Train to Georgia" (1973, Buddah Records)
- The Spinners – "The Rubberband Man" (1974)
- Andrew Smith – Film scores collection (1980, Major Records)
