= New Attitude (song) =

Single by Patti LaBelle

from the album Beverly Hills Cop: Original Motion Picture Soundtrack
- B-side: "Shoot Out"
- Released: December 1984
- Recorded: September 1984
- Genre: New wave; dance-pop; synth-pop
- Length: 4:36 (album version); 3:59 (single version)
- Label: MCA
- Songwriters: Jon Gilutin; Bunny Hull; Sharon Robinson
- Producers: Peter Burnetta; Rick Chudacoff; Howie Rice

Patti LaBelle singles chronology
""Love Has Finally Come at Last"" (1984)	"New Attitude" (1984)	"Stir It Up" (1985)

Music video
- "New Attitude" on YouTube

"New Attitude" is a song by American singer Patti LaBelle. It was written by Sharon Robinson, Jon Gilutin, and Bunny Hull and recorded by LaBelle for the motion picture soundtrack album to the 1984 action comedy film Beverly Hills Cop, while production was helmed by Rick Chudacoff, Howie Rice, and Peter Burnetta. Released as a single in December 1984, it helped launch LaBelle's solo career as a pop music singer after the singer had spent seven years without a crossover pop hit following the break-up of her band Labelle.

"New Attitude" climbed to number 17 on the US Billboard Hot 100 and number one on the Hot Dance Music chart in a remixed form in 1985. It also peaked at number three on the Hot R&B/Hip-Hop Songs chart in 1985.

== Background and composition ==
In 1984, Patti LaBelle began taking part in films, participating in her first acting role in the acclaimed film, A Soldier's Story. Around the same time, the producers of the film, Beverly Hills Cop, were busy putting together a soundtrack for the film, and called on LaBelle to record two songs for its soundtrack. "New Attitude", a song about a woman changing her outlook on life both emotionally and physically, marked LaBelle's first single for MCA Records.

== Music video ==
LaBelle shot the first music video of her career with "New Attitude", which was filmed at a fashion store. The clip features LaBelle on a set designed to resemble a high-end clothing store. She enters somewhat modestly dressed and as she sings the song, she is confronted by a critical sales clerk who examines her. She enters a changing room, and exits wearing a high-fashion outfit. She continues to appear in various outfits, including a white jumpsuit and headband in an East Asian font print while other women dance and sing backing vocals. She exits the store at the end of the song, having achieved her "new attitude" thanks to the fashion makeover.

== Charts ==
Chart (1984/85)	Peak position
Australia (Kent Music Report)	84
New Zealand (Recorded Music NZ)	30
US Billboard Hot 100	17
US Dance Club Songs (Billboard)	1
US Hot R&B/Hip-Hop Songs (Billboard)	3
