= Rockie Robbins =

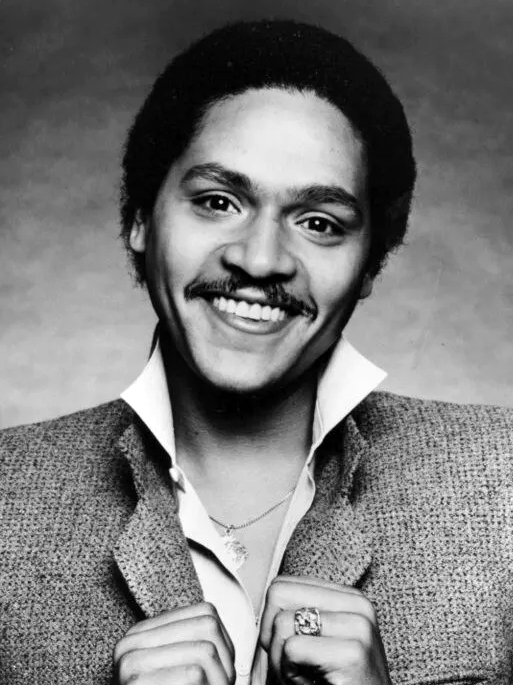
- Robbins in 1982

Background information
- Born: Edward W. Robbins Jr. Minneapolis, Minnesota, U.S.
- Genre: Soul
- Occupation: Singer
- Years active: 1979–present
- Labels: A&M; MCA

Edward W. Robbins Jr., known as Rockie Robbins, is an American soul singer from Minneapolis, Minnesota.

== Biography ==
Robbins was born Edward W. Robbins Jr. He signed for A&M Records in 1979 and cut his first album, which was arranged and produced by veteran Chicago producers, Richard Evans and Johnny Pate. The master tapes for this record were erased in transit to the record company and the album had to be re-recorded. Robbins' self-titled debut did not sell particularly well, but the label retained him for a second album, which was produced by former Philadelphia top arranger and producer, Bobby Martin, in Los Angeles. This resulted in the singer's biggest hit, "You and Me", which reached the Billboard Hot 100 and the R&B Top 10, staying on that chart for over five months.

A third album, produced by Skip Scarborough and Jerry Peters, saw Robbins score two R&B hits including "I Believe in Love" (#30), in 1981. A fourth A&M album was recorded in 1983 but remains unreleased. After a break, Robbins signed to MCA Records who, in 1984, included his song "Emergency" in the Grammy Award-winning soundtrack to the Hollywood blockbuster Beverly Hills Cop. They also released Robbins' second self-titled album in 1985, but without success. Robbins later released three singles, "Serious" (Respect Records/Profile Records; 1989), "Are You Ready" (Debut; 1991) and "Be My Lady" (High On Rhythm; 1992).

In 2018 Robbins signed with Expansion Records to work with long-serving producer Ricky Peterson. The single "Good Life/Let’s Groove", remixed in the UK by Boogie Back Productions, entered the UK Soul Chart at No. 1 in February 2019. Good Life, the album, was released in March 2019 to coincide with his live show in London at the Jazz Café on 10 March.

== Discography ==
Albums

- Rockie Robbins (A&M Records, 1979) US #204
- You and Me (A&M, 1980) US #71, US R&B #19
- I Believe in Love (A&M, 1981) US #147, US R&B #47
- Unreleased album (A&M, 1983)
- Rockie Robbins (MCA Records, 1985) US R&B #60
- Good Life (Expansion Records, 2019)

Charting singles

- "Be Ever Wonderful" (1979) US R&B #67
- "You and Me" (1980) US #80, US R&B #9
- "Hang Tough" (1980) US R&B #70
- "Time to Think" (1981) US R&B #32
- "After Loving You" (1981) US R&B #59
- "I Believe in Love" (1982) US R&B #30
- "We Belong Together" (1985) US R&B #45
- "Good Life/Let's Groove" (2019) UK Soul Chart #1
