= Carla L. Benson =

American vocalist

Carla L. Benson is an American vocalist, actress and educator known for her recorded background vocals.

== Biography ==
=== Early years ===
Carla L. Benson grew up in Camden, South Jersey. Though her parents were educators they recognized that Benson was destined to sing so they provided classical voice lessons for her under Dr. James Mumford.

=== Early career ===
Benson began her professional career singing with her cousin Barbara J. Ingram and her best friend from childhood and later college roommate, Evette L. Benton. Together, they were the in-house background vocalists for the Philadelphia International Records. She sang background vocals for Billy Paul, Lou Rawls, Patti Labelle, and well-known artists. Before the age of 21, Evette and Carla were sought out by some of the best producers worldwide and were listed in the Top 40 Women in the Music Business in the late 70s.

After auditioning for Thom Bell, they became the in-house background vocalists for Philadelphia International Records for about 8 years. They were named "The Sweethearts of Sigma" by mix master Tom Moulton at Sigma Sound Studios where they recorded most of their work.

They appeared on many projects outside the Philadelphia International stable. They can be heard on hundreds of hits, including Billy Paul's "Me and Mrs. Jones", The Spinners' "I'll Be Around", McFadden & Whitehead's "Ain't No Stoppin' Us Now", Evelyn "Champagne" King's "Shame", Patti LaBelle's "New Attitude" and "If Only You Knew", Lou Rawls' "You'll Never Find Another Love Like Mine", and Patti LaBelle and Michael McDonald's "On My Own".

Confidentiality agreements prevented the Sweethearts from being credited as the vocalists for several major disco hits. The trio worked as named and unnamed vocalists for studio orchestras MFSB, The Salsoul Orchestra, The Original Ritchie Family, and John Davis and the Monster Orchestra. They also provided background vocals for Grace Jones, The Trammps, the Village People, Gloria Gaynor, Loleatta Holloway, France Joli, and other disco acts. After the runaway success of Saturday Night Fever, even John Travolta tried his hand at recording and insisted on the vocal assistance of the Sweethearts.

With the decline of disco, work waned, and the Sweethearts broke up. Benson was approached to produce the annual fundraising event for The Dr. Charles Henderson Auxiliary, the only African-American auxiliary of the Cooper University Hospital in her native Camden, New Jersey. She wrote and directed an ensemble cast, as well as produced and performed in her creation, which she named "Rhapsody in Black".

Benson won lead roles in two productions of "Ain't Misbehavin'" at The Riverfront Dinner Theater in Philadelphia, Pennsylvania.

The Sweethearts toured exclusively with LaBelle, who renamed them 'The Sweeties.'. It was during their tenure with LaBelle that they recorded the soundtrack for Beverly Hills Cop and did the popular video "Stir It Up". LaBelle received her first platinum album, Winner in You, on which the Sweeties performed. She orchestrated the moment when the Sweeties received their platinum albums during an on-air interview on People Are Talking with Richard Bey in 1987.

Barbara Ingram unexpectedly died in 1994 Evette Benton passed in 2021. Benson also worked as a substitute teacher for the Camden School system.

=== Work as a solo performer ===
In November 1988, Benson opened in the main room of the Claridge Hotel and Casino, which LaBelle attended and sang at. Benson spent the next two years performing exclusively at the Claridge Casino, as well as Trump Casino's special events.

=== Wedding singer ===
When the casinos closed many of their lounges, Benson sang for over fifteen years with a wedding band, The Franklin Alison Orchestra, from Princeton, New Jersey.

Tony Award-winning writer Joseph A. Walker (The River Niger) was hired to produce a series of musicals for Rutgers University. Under his direction, Benson starred in productions of Dreamgirls, The Amen Corner, Buddy Bolden and Raisin. Before his death, he was writing another musical, especially for her, which he hoped to have produced on Broadway.

Walker's musical director, Tony Booker, was instrumental in Benson being signed to a five-year contract at the Kennedy Center for the Performing Arts in Washington, D.C. There, she was featured in their annual production of Black Nativity, under the direction of the founder of the Duke Ellington School of Performing Arts, Mike Malone. She had a role in a developing work written and directed by Tony Award-winning choreographer George Faison.

In 1996, Benson graduated from the Technical Institute of New Jersey, Pennsauken Campus as a certified paralegal. She began work as an executive legal secretary in arbitration for Judge Vogelson at the Hall of Justice in Camden.

=== Working on film and documentary ===
In 2000, Benson was approached by her friend, Allan Slutsky, to participate in a movie about the studio musicians of Motown, who were called "The Funk Brothers". Being a studio musician herself, this project held a particular appeal for her. Slutsky hired her to be the Section Leader for the background vocals for the film. Benson hired her cousin Johnny Ingram to accompany her, and they traveled with her brother Keith Benson, Associate Producer for the film, to Detroit, Michigan for two weeks of rehearsals and filming. She worked with artists like Gerald LeVert, whose father, Eddie LeVert, she'd previously worked with as a member of the O'Jays; Chaka Khan; Bootsy Collins; Ben Harper; Joan Osborne; Tom Scott (saxophonist); and the Funk Brothers themselves. The project, called Standing in the Shadows of Motown, became an award-winning documentary and went on to win three Grammy Awards.

Encouraged by her mother to return to music, Benson toured the world with the Funk Brothers for about three years.

Also during this time, writer John A. Jackson approached Benson for an interview in his book, A House on Fire, the Rise and Fall of Philadelphia Soul, which was released in 2005.

=== Present ===
Benson continues to perform and has released two new original projects, a single called "Welcome" and a CD entitled You Should Be Here. In November 2014, she directed and produced a Christmas video on YouTube with a cast of Camden, New Jersey residents, entitled "Voices of Camden, Featuring Carla Benson". Carla Benson was Vocal Music Director at her church, "Sword of the Spirit Christian Center" for over 15 years.

Carla self-published a biography in 2025 titled, Journey Into Love which follows the lives of herself, Barbara Ingram, and Evette Benton and their families and friends.
