= John Davis and the Monster Orchestra =

American disco band

- Also known as: John E. Davis, John Davis Orchestra
- Genres: Disco
- Years active: 1976–1980
- Label: SAM/Columbia
- Past members: John (The Monster) Davis; Charles Collins "Sugar Bear" Foreman; Craig Snyder; Bobby Eli; Roland Chambers; Larry Washington; Barbara Ingram; Carla Benson; Yvette Benton; The Don Renaldo Strings & Horns and more

John Davis and the Monster Orchestra were an American disco band, noted for their lead member (John "the Monster" Davis), who lent his name to the band as well as producing all of their output.

== History ==
The ensemble released its first album, Night and Day, in 1976. The 12" single, "I Can't Stop", was one of its original tunes. The song became an influence in the culture of hip hop being used by the Brothers Black, Jungle Brothers, Run-Dmc and Missy Elliott. The album enjoyed minor success and its second release was 1977's Up Jumped the Devil. By 1978, the band had released its third album, Ain't That Enough For You. It was their most commercially successful release, featuring the self-titled hit "Ain't That Enough For You". The album gave the outfit its only UK hit, when the record reached #70 in the UK Singles Chart.

1979's The Monster Orchestra Strikes Again! would be the band's final album release. The record spawned two 12" singles: "Love Magic" would rival the group's previous success, whilst "Bourgie Bourgie" was a cover version of the Ashford & Simpson penned song.

John Davis and the Monster Orchestra's last release in 1981 was available only on a 12" single, "Hangin' Out" charted on Billboard Hot Dance Club Play chart in August 1981 and topped at number 46. In 1990, a remix of "(Feel The) Love Magic" was released and it became a club hit again. In 1992, Davis wrote, produced and performed the "Theme From Beverly Hills, 90210."

Davis was a member of the MFSB studio session band during its hey-day in the late 1960s and early to mid-1970s, appearing on many Philadelphia International recordings. He was involved in producing and arranging the #1 R&B hit (#4 pop), "Be Thankful For What You've Got", a million-seller for William deVaughn in 1974.
