= Barbara Ingram =

American singer

- Born: Barbara Jane Ingram; February 9, 1947; Camden, New Jersey, United States
- Died: October 20, 1994 (aged 47); Camden, New Jersey
- Burial place: Sunset Memorial Park, Pennsauken, Camden County, New Jersey
- Occupations: Musical career
- Also known as: Barbie
- Genres: R&B, soul, funk, funk rock
- Occupations: Singer, songwriter, composer, dancer, musician
- Instruments: Piano, keyboard, vocals
- Years active: 1965–1994
- Label: Various
- Notable work: Philadelphia Sweetheart: Barbara Ingram: R&B/Soul: 2018
- Spouse: Sherman Marshall
- Parent(s): Reverend N. Henry and Vera Ingram
- Relatives: Carla Benson, Cousin

Barbara Jane Ingram (February 9, 1947 – October 20, 1994) was an American R&B singer and songwriter born in Camden, New Jersey who was active throughout the early 1970s until the mid-late 1980s, enjoying modest success as a backup singer for almost two decades.

== Career ==
In 1972, Ingram formed a vocal trio with her cousin Carla Benson and Benson's close friend, Evette Benton, alternating with group names such as: "The Sweethearts of Sigma", "The Philadelphia Angels", "The Sweeties" and "The Sweethearts". The trio can be heard on many Contemporary R&B/Disco albums recorded in Philadelphia.

In 1971, she sang background vocals, alongside songwriter Linda Creed, on The Stylistics eponymous album, reappearing on their 1973 successor album, Rockin' Roll Baby.

In 1973 and 1974, Ingram appeared on Hawaiian based soul singer Dick Jensen’s eponymous debut album, followed by R&B/Soul band Ecstasy, Passion & Pain's eponymous debut album.

Through the decade of the 1970s, Ingram, Benson and Benton comprised the in-house backup group for Philadelphia International Records, known as the Sweethearts of Sigma. They worked for producer and Philadelphia soul co-creator Thom Bell, as well as backing a number of acts that came through to record in the closely related Sigma Sound Studios. The trio can be heard on a number of hits, such as The Spinners’ million-sellers "Could It Be I'm Falling in Love" (1972) and "Games People Play" (1975). They were also part of John Davis and the Monster Orchestra.

Before 1976
Year	Album	Artist	Role
1971	The Stylistics	The Stylistics	Vocals (Background)
1972	Round 2	The Stylistics	Vocals (Background)
1973	Rockin' Roll Baby	The Stylistics	Vocals (Background)
1973	Spinners	The Spinners	Vocals (Background)
1974	All My Life	Arthur Prysock	Vocals, Vocals (Background)
1974	Lady Love	Barbara Mason	Vocals (Background)
1974	Mighty Love	The Spinners	Vocals (Background)
1974	New and Improved	The Spinners	Vocals (Background)
1974	The Magic of the Blue	Blue Magic	Vocal Arrangement
1975	My Way	Major Harris	Vocals (Background)
1975	Pick of the Litter	The Spinners	Vocals (Background)
1975	The Soul Survivors	The Soul Survivors / Soul Survivors	Vocals (Background)
1975	The Way We Were	Willis "Gator" Jackson	Vocals (Background)

== Later life ==
After 1975
Year	Album	Artist	Role
1976	Tymes Up	The Tymes	Vocals (Background)
1976	Travelin' in Heavy Traffic	Don Covay	Vocals
1976	Ten Percent	Double Exposure	Vocals (Background)
1976	Summertime	MFSB	Vocals (Background)
1976	On the Town	Webster Lewis	Vocals (Background)
1976	Nice 'n' Naasty	The Salsoul Orchestra	Vocals
1976	Loleatta [1976]	Loleatta Holloway	Vocals (Background)
1976	Life on Mars	Dexter Wansel	Vocals (Background)
1976	Happiness Is Being with the Spinners	The Spinners	Vocals (Background)
1976	Disco Inferno	The Trammps	Vocals (Background)
1976	Christmas Jollies	The Salsoul Orchestra	Vocals
1976	Billy Jackson & The Citizen's Band	Billy Jackson	Vocals (Background)
1977	When You Hear Lou, You've Heard It All	Lou Rawls	Vocals (Background), Vocal Arrangement
1977	What the World Is Coming To	Dexter Wansel	Vocals (Background)
1977	The Girl Most Likely	Claudja Barry	Vocals (Background)
1977	Portfolio	Grace Jones	Vocals (Background)
1977	Phyllis Hyman	Phyllis Hyman	Vocals (Background)
1977	Monkey Island	J. Geils Band	Vocals, Vocals (Background)
1977	Magic Journey	The Salsoul Orchestra	Vocals
1977	Izitso	Cat Stevens / Yusuf	Vocals
1977	Cuchi-Cuchi	Charo / The Salsoul Orchestra	Vocals
1977	A Portrait of Melba	Melba Moore	Vocals (Background)
1977	A Night to Remember	Eddie Holman	Vocals (Background)
1978	You're the One	Rory Block	Vocals
1978	What About You!	Stanley Turrentine	Vocals (Background)
1978	Voyager	Dexter Wansel	Vocals (Background)
1978	So Full of Love	The O'Jays	Vocals
1978	Nothing Says I Love You Like I Love You	Jerry Butler	Vocals (Background)
1978	Melba [1978]	Melba Moore	Vocals (Background)
1978	Law & Order	Love Committee	Vocals, Vocals (Background)
1978	In the Night-Time	Michael Henderson	Vocals (Background)
1978	Hear Me Out	David Simmons	Vocals
1978	Happy to Be with You	Jean Carn	Vocals (Background)
1978	Giving It Back	Phil Hurtt	Vocals
1978	Gaz	Gaz	Vocals (Background)
1978	Fame	Grace Jones	Vocals
1978	Claudja	Claudja Barry	Vocals (Background)
1979	Time Is Slipping Away	Dexter Wansel	Vocals (Background)
1979	The World Belongs to Me	David Simmons	Vocals
1979	The Whole World's Dancing	The Trammps	Vocals (Background)
1979	Teddy	Teddy Pendergrass	Vocals (Background)
1979	P H Factor	Phil Hurtt	Vocals
1979	Nothing Says I Love You Like I Love You/The Best Love I Ever Had	Jerry Butler	Vocals (Background)
1979	Nightlife Unlimited	Nightlife Unlimited	Vocals
1979	McFadden & Whitehead	McFadden & Whitehead	Vocals (Background)
1979	Locker Room	Double Exposure	Vocals (Background)
1979	I've Always Wanted to Sing...Not Just Write Songs	Bunny Sigler	Vocals, Vocals (Background)
1979	Heavy Love	Dee Edwards	Vocals (Background)
1979	Do It All	Michael Henderson	Vocals (Background)
1979	Disco Choo Choo	Nightlife Unlimited	Vocals
1980	Tonight	France Joli	Vocals, Vocals (Background)
1980	TP	Teddy Pendergrass	Vocals, Vocals (Background)
1980	Mysteries of the World	MFSB	Vocals, Vocals (Background)
1980	Love Sensation	Loleatta Holloway	Vocals (Background)
1980	Hurry Up This Way Again	The Stylistics	Vocals (Background)
1980	Deep	Richie Rome	Vocals
1981	What a Woman Needs	Melba Moore	Vocals (Background)
1981	Welcome Back	Blue Magic	Vocals (Background)
1983	Brand New Day	Ronnie Dyson	Composer
1984	Night Stalkers	Ingram / Ingram Family	Vocals (Background)
1986	Winner in You	Patti LaBelle	Vocals (Background)
1986	Sweet Freedom: The Best of Michael McDonald	Michael McDonald	Vocals (Background)
1986	Always in the Mood	Shirley Jones	Vocals (Background)
1989	The Complete Thom Bell Sessions	Elton John	Vocals (Background)
1989	D'Atra Hicks	D'Atra Hicks	Vocals (Background)
1992	Schmuse Songs, Vol. 1	Various Artists	Vocals (Background)
1992	Salsoul Classics, Vol. 2	Various Artists	Vocals
1992	Salsoul Classics, Vol. 1	Various Artists	Vocals
1992	Original Salsoul Classics: The 20th Anniversary	Various Artists	Vocals
1992	Club Epic, Vol. 2	Various Artists	Vocals (Background)
1993	The West End Story, Vol. 4	Various Artists	Vocals (Background)
1993	The Very Best of the Spinners	The Spinners	Vocals (Background)
1994	Tightening It Up: The Best of Archie Bell & the Drells	Archie Bell & the Drells	Vocals (Background)
1994	This Is Where the Happy People Go: The Best of the Trammps	The Trammps	Vocals (Background)
1994	The Best of Now and Then	Major Harris	Vocals (Background)
1994	Now	France Joli	Vocals (Background)
1994	Get Up & Boogie	Freddie James	Vocals (Background)
1994	Come to Me	France Joli	Vocals (Background)
1994	Can't Fake the Feeling	Geraldine Hunt	Vocals (Background)
1995	The Salsoul Classics 2, Vols. 3 & 4	Various Artists	Performer, Primary Artist
1995	Soul Love 1-3	Various Artists	Vocals (Background)
1995	Silk	Damon Harris	Vocals (Background)
1995	I Believe in Love	Major Harris	Vocals (Background)
1995	Constantly	Ronnie Dyson	Vocals (Background), Composer, Primary Artist
1996	The Legacy of Phyllis Hyman	Phyllis Hyman	Vocals (Background)
1996	The Best of Major Harris [Unidisc]	Major Harris	Vocals (Background)
1996	The Best of Bunny Sigler: Sweeter Than the Berry	Bunny Sigler	Vocals (Background)
1996	The Best of Blue Magic: Soulful Spell	Blue Magic	Vocals (Background)
1996	Soul Dreamers	Various Artists	Primary Artist
1996	Numbers/Izitso/Back to Earth [Box]	Cat Stevens	Vocals
1996	Greatest Hits	Loleatta Holloway	Vocals (Background)
1997	The Very Best of the Spinners, Vol. 2	The Spinners	Vocals (Background)
1997	The Philly Sound: Kenny Gamble, Leon Huff and the Story of Brotherly Love (1966-1976)	Various Artists	Vocals (Background)
1998	I Will Survive: The Anthology	Gloria Gaynor	Vocals (Background)
1998	Freak Out [Sony]	Various Artists	Vocals (Background)
1999	MFSB & Gamble Huff Orchestra/Mysteries of the World	MFSB	Vocals, Vocals (Background)
1999	Let Me Be Good to You/Sit Down and Talk to Me	Lou Rawls	Vocals (Background)
1999	Let 'Em In/Only the Strong Survive	Billy Paul	Vocals, Vocals (Background)
1999	It's Time for Love/This One's for You	Teddy Pendergrass	Vocals (Background)
2000	The Voice of Michael McDonald	Michael McDonald	Vocals (Background)
2000	Love Vibrations/Happy Birthday Baby	Joe Simon	Vocals (Background)
2001	Queen of the Night: The Ultimate Club Collection	Loleatta Holloway	Vocals
2001	Plays with Feeling/The Way We Were	Willis "Gator" Jackson	Vocals (Background)
2001	On the Road to Find Out	Cat Stevens / Yusuf	Vocals
2001	Christmas Jollies	Various Artists	Vocals
2002	Philly Super Soul Hits	Various Artists	Vocals (Background)
2003	The Chrome Collection	The Spinners	Vocals (Background)
2004	Jean Carn/Happy to Be with You	Jean Carn	Vocals (Background)
2004	Ain't No Stoppin' Us Now: Best of the PIR Years	McFadden & Whitehead	Vocals (Background)
2005	When You Hear Lou, You've Heard It All/Lou Rawls Live	Lou Rawls	Vocals (Background)
2005	Vincent Montana Jr. Presents One Hour Of Christmas Music: 44 Yuletide Carols Performed In An Upbeat Style	Vincent Montana, Jr. / The Philly Sound Orchestra	Vocals, Group Member
2005	The Ultimate Collection	Michael McDonald	Vocals (Background)
2005	The Essential O'Jays	The O'Jays	Vocals (Background)
2005	The Anthology	The Salsoul Orchestra	Vocals
2005	Teddy/It's Time for Love	Teddy Pendergrass	Vocals (Background)
2005	Soul Divas	Various Artists	Vocals (Background)
2005	So Full of Love/Identify Yourself	The O'Jays	Vocals (Background)
2005	Live! Coast to Coast/TP	Teddy Pendergrass	Vocals (Background)
2005	Gold	Cat Stevens	Vocals
2006	The Anthology	Double Exposure	Vocals (Background)
2006	The Anthology	Instant Funk	Vocals (Background)
2006	Shades of Blue/Family Reunion [Edsel]	Lou Rawls	Vocals (Background)
2006	Collectables Classics [Box Set]	Blue Magic	Vocal Arrangement
2007	The Platinum Collection	The Spinners	Vocals (Background)
2007	The Essential Teddy Pendergrass	Teddy Pendergrass	Vocals (Background)
2007	The Essential Lou Rawls	Lou Rawls	Vocals (Background)
2007	Sex & Soul: Mixed by Moog-Ly	Moogly	Vocals
2007	Night & Day	John Davis / John Davis & the Monster Orchestra	Vocals (Background)
2007	Atlantic 60th: On the Dance Floor, Vol. 1	Various Artists	Vocals (Background)
2008	The Sound of Philadelphia: Gamble & Huff's Greatest Hits	Various Artists	Vocals (Background)
2008	The Essential Patti LaBelle	Patti LaBelle	Vocals (Background)
2008	Love Train: The Sound of Philadelphia	Various Artists	Vocals (Background)
2009	Would You Like To Fly	Ingram / Ingram Family	Vocals (Background)
2009	Love in the 70's	Various Artists	Vocals (Background)
2010	The Essential Patti LaBelle [3.0]	Patti LaBelle	Vocals (Background)
2010	Now Is the Time/Close Company	Lou Rawls	Vocals (Background)
2010	Essential: Summer Breeze	Various Artists	Vocals (Background)
2010	Essential: Easy Listening	Various Artists	Vocals (Background)
2010	Black Tie/Love Talk	The Manhattans	Vocals (Background)
2011	Pure... Love	Various Artists	Vocals (Background)
2011	Pure... Crooners	Various Artists	Vocals (Background)
2012	Soul: The Collection	Various Artists	Vocals (Background)
2012	Philadelphia International Classics: The Tom Moulton Remixes	Tom Moulton	Vocals (Background)
2012	70s: The Collection	Various Artists	Vocals (Background)
2014	Phase 2/Brand New Day	Ronnie Dyson	Composer, Primary Artist, Vocals, Vocals (Background)
2015	Disco	Grace Jones	Vocals (Background)
2017	Five Classic Albums	The Stylistics	Vocals (Background)
2020	Dee Dee Bridgewater [1976]/Just Family/Bad for Me/Dee Dee Bridgewater [1980]	Dee Dee Bridgewater	Vocals (Background)
2022	Give Me Some Emotion: The Epic Anthology 1976-1981	Webster Lewis	Composer
2023	Christmas Jollies I + II	The Salsoul Orchestra	Vocals
2024	It's Good for the Soul: The Vince Montana Years 1975-1978	The Salsoul Orchestra	Vocals

In 1976 Ingram sang lead vocals on the album The Funk Is In Our Music for Ingram Kingdom, a family group that included her five brothers James [Jimmy], Norman [Butch], William [Billy], Robert [Timmy] and John [Johnny]. Switching their name to 'Ingram' in 1977, Barbara continued to contribute background vocals to the group's next three albums released 1977-1984, That's All!, Would You Like To Fly and Night Stalkers. Ingram is pictured on their first album Ingram Kingdom.

Throughout the years, from 1975 until 1985 she sang backup for these artists among many others for their albums.

- Brenda Mitchell
- Cindy Williams
- Dick Jensen
- Eddie Kendricks
- Elkie Brooks
- Evelyn "Champagne" King (Smooth Talk)
- Grace Jones (Fame, Muse)
- Luther Vandross
- Marvin Gaye
- Philippé Wynne
- Plastic Surprise
- Sister Sledge
- Stevie Wonder

Ingram continued to sing live concert shows from 1980 until 1986, then from 1988 until 1992.

On 16 March 2018, Society Hill Records released a posthumous LP, "Barbara Ingram: Philadelphia Sweetheart." It's available on Spotify and Apple Music.

== Personal life, and death ==
Barbara Ingram was born the second of nine children to Reverend N. Henry and Vera Ingram of Camden, NJ. Their family was large and built on a foundation of faith and love. Music was an integral part of the Ingram family, so it was no surprise that Barbara pursued a career in music.

Ingram was married to songwriter/producer Sherman Marshall, who wrote famous 1970s hits such as "I'm Doin' Fine Now" by New York City, "Then Came You" by The Spinners and "Lady Love" by Lou Rawls. Ingram also had a daughter named Denene, who died in 1976.

On October 20, 1994, Barbara Ingram died at the age of 47, in Camden, New Jersey; she suffered from lupus and cancer. The funeral was held in her hometown of Camden. Her husband and daughter both preceded her in death.
