= Sweethearts of Sigma =

The Sweethearts of Sigma, sometimes known simply as The Sweethearts or The Sweeties, were an American female vocal trio comprising Carla Benson, Evette Benton and Barbara Ingram. Primarily backing vocalists, they sang backup on many recordings made in Philadelphia, especially in the 1970s.

Carla Benson (born 1953) and Barbara Ingram (1947–1994) were first cousins, growing up together in Camden, New Jersey, with their friend Evette Benton (1952–2021). Barbara Ingram started singing as a child, and in 1972 toured as a Raelette with Ray Charles. After her return, she learned that record producer Thom Bell was setting up a new record company, Philadelphia International, with Leon Huff and Kenny Gamble. She auditioned successfully for Bell, who asked her to form a vocal trio to work as backing singers on studio recordings. Ingram called Benson, who had already started singing with her friend Evette Benton, and the three agreed to audition together. Bell and Huff immediately agreed to record them on a session by Joe Simon, and they rapidly became established as the label's in-house backing vocalists.

They most often recorded at Sigma Sound Studios, and acquired the informal name of "The Sweethearts of Sigma" after initially being referred to as "Tommy's Girls" (referring to Thom Bell). When recording at Alpha International Studios, they were known as the "Alpha Angels". Among the artists with whom they recorded were Billy Paul, McFadden & Whitehead, The O'Jays, The Stylistics, Harold Melvin and the Bluenotes, Teddy Pendergrass, Lou Rawls, Elton John, and Dionne Warwick. They also toured for five years as backing singers with Patti LaBelle. Barbara Ingram and Evette Benton had several memorable guest appearances on hit songs; Ingram provided the sensual moans for the Major Harris classic, "Love Won't Let Me Wait," and played Teddy Pendergrass' love interest on "Come Go With Me," while Benton provided the mysterious, sultry female vocal on The Spinners' classic, "Games People Play."

After the group disbanded in the early 1980s, Carla Benson performed in several Broadway productions, and recorded with Larry Carlton and others. She trained and qualified as a legal secretary, and also worked as a music teacher. Barbara Ingram died in 1994, aged 47. Evette Benton worked as a special education teacher, and later became director of a pre-school program in Camden. She died in 2021, aged 68.
