= Bob Babbitt =

American bassist (1937–2012)

- Babbitt performing in 2004

Background information
- Born: Robert Andrew Kreinar; November 26, 1937; Pittsburgh, Pennsylvania, U.S.
- Died: July 16, 2012 (aged 74) Nashville, Tennessee, U.S.
- Genres: R&B; soul; funk; rock
- Occupation: Musician
- Instrument: Bass
- Years active: 1961–2012
- Formerly of: The Funk Brothers

Robert Andrew Kreinar (November 26, 1937 – July 16, 2012), known as Bob Babbitt, was an American bassist, most famous for his work as a member of Motown Records' studio band, the Funk Brothers, from 1966 to 1972, as well as his tenure as part of MFSB for Philadelphia International Records afterwards. Also in 1968, with Mike Campbell, Ray Monette and Andrew Smith, he formed the band Scorpion, which lasted until 1970. He is ranked number 59 on Bass Player magazine's list of "The 100 Greatest Bass Players of All Time".

== Biography ==
At Motown, Babbitt traded off sessions with original Motown bassist James Jamerson. When Motown moved to Los Angeles, Babbitt went in the opposite direction and ended up in New York as well as making occasional trips to Philadelphia. In this new city, he worked on recordings for Frank Sinatra, Barry Manilow, Gloria Gaynor, Robert Palmer, and Alice Cooper. During this time, his most notable successes were "Midnight Train to Georgia" (1973) by Gladys Knight & the Pips and "The Rubberband Man" by the Spinners.

The Pittsburgh-born Babbitt's most notable bass performances include "Signed, Sealed, Delivered I'm Yours" (1970) by Stevie Wonder; "War" (1970) by Edwin Starr; "The Tears of a Clown" (1970) by Smokey Robinson & the Miracles; "Mercy Mercy Me (The Ecology)" (1971) and "Inner City Blues" (1971) by Marvin Gaye; "Band of Gold" (1970) by Freda Payne; "Ball of Confusion (That's What the World Is Today)", "Just My Imagination (Running Away with Me)" (1971) and "Masterpiece" (1973) by the Temptations; "Scorpio" (1971) by Dennis Coffey; and "Just Don't Want to Be Lonely" (1973) by The Main Ingredient.

He participated in hundreds of other hits, including "Little Town Flirt" by Del Shannon and "Scorpio" by Dennis Coffey & the Detroit Guitar Band. He played on the Jimi Hendrix album Crash Landing. He also played bass on Cindy Bullens' 1979 album Desire Wire. He accepted an offer from Phil Collins to perform on his album of Motown and 1960s soul classics, Going Back, and also appeared in Collins' Going Back – Live at Roseland Ballroom, NYC concert DVD. He appeared on stage in an episode of American Idol, backing up Jacob Lusk's performance of "You're All I Need to Get By" for AI's Motown Week in March 2011.

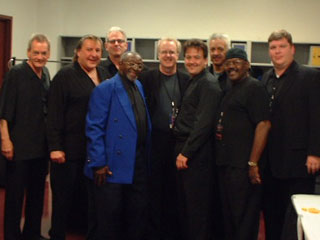
Babbitt (2nd from left) with the Funk Brothers in 2006

In 2003, Babbitt played on Marion James' album Essence, and amongst others playing on the record were Beegie Adair, Reese Wynans, Jack Pearson (The Allman Brothers), and drummer Chucki Burke.

He was added to the Music City Walk of Fame in June 2012.

Babbitt died on July 16, 2012, aged 74, from brain cancer.

== Discography ==
With Frank Black

- Fast Man Raider Man (Cooking Vinyl, 2006)

With Blue Magic

- The Magic of the Blue (Atco Records, 1974)

With Dee Dee Bridgewater

- Dee Dee Bridgewater (Elektra, 1980)

With Carlene Carter

- Two Sides to Every Woman (Warner Bros., 1979)

With Joe Cocker

- Hymn for My Soul (EMI, 2007)

With Phil Collins

- Going Back (Atlantic, 2010)

With Lou Courtney

- I'm In Need of Love (Epic, 1974)

With Tim Curry

- Read My Lips (A&M, 1978)
- Fearless (A&M, 1979)

With Peter Frampton

- Thank You Mr. Churchill (New Door Records, 2010)

With Marvin Gaye

- What's Going On (Motown Records, 1971)

With Gloria Gaynor

- Never Can Say Goodbye (MGM, 1975)
- Experience Gloria Gaynor (MGM, 1975)
- I've Got You (Polydor, 1976)

With Major Harris

- My Way (Atlantic Records, 1974)

With Richie Havens

- Connections (Elektra, 1980)

With Cissy Houston

- Cissy Houston (Private Stock Records, 1977)

With Phyllis Hyman

- Somewhere in My Lifetime (Arista, 1979)
- Goddess of Love (Arista, 1983)

With Sass Jordan

- Get What You Give (Universal Music, 2006)

With Margie Joseph

- Sweet Surrender (Atlantic, 1974)
- Margie (Atlantic, 1975)

With Eric Kaz

- Cul-De-Sac (Atlantic, 1974)

With Ben E. King

- Supernatural (Atlantic, 1975)

With Gladys Knight

- Miss Gladys Knight (Buddah, 1978)

With Nils Lofgren

- Nils (A&M, 1979)

With Taj Mahal

- Evolution (The Most Recent) (Warner Bros., 1978)

With Barry Manilow

- Barry Manilow (Bell, 1973)
- Even Now (Arista, 1978)

With Herbie Mann

- Surprises (Atlantic, 1976)

With Moon Martin

- Mystery Ticket (Capitol, 1982)

With Kathy McCord

- Baby Come Out Tonight (Manhattan, 1979)

With Jimmy McGriff

- Red Beans (Groove Merchant, 1976)

With Stephanie Mills

- Movin' in the Right Direction (ABC, 1974)

With Jackie Moore

- Sweet Charlie Babe (Atlantic Records, 1973)

With Tracy Nelson

- Sweet Soul Music (MCA Records, 1975)

With Kenny Nolan

- A Song Between Us (Polydor, 1978)

With Laura Nyro

- Smile (Columbia, 1976)

With The O'Jays

- So Full of Love (Philadelphia, 1978)
- Identify Yourself (Philadelphia, 1979)

With Yoko Ono

- Feeling the Space (Apple Records, 1973)

With Tony Orlando and Dawn

- To Be With You (Elektra, 1976)

With Robert Palmer

- Double Fun (Island, 1978)
- Don't Explain (EMI, 1990)

With Teddy Pendergrass

- Teddy (Philadelphia, 1979)
- This One's for You (Philadelphia, 1982)

With Roxanne Potvin

- The Way It Feels (Alert, 2006)

With Bonnie Raitt

- Streetlights (Warner Bros. Records, 1974)

With Lou Rawls

- Now Is the Time (Epic, 1982)

With Irene Reid

- Two of Us (Glades, 1976)

With Vicki Sue Robinson

- Vicki Sue Robinson (RCA Victor, 1976)

With Rodriguez

- Cold Fact (Sussex, 1970)

With Rosie

- Better Late Than Never (RCA Victor, 1976)

With Jimmy Ruffin

- Jimmy Ruffin (Polydor, 1973)

With Tom Rush

- Ladies Love Outlaws (CBS, 1974)

With Harvey Scales

- Confidential Affair (Casablanca, 1978)

With Helen Schneider

- Let It Be Now (RCA Records, 1978)

With Marlena Shaw

- Just a Matter of Time (Blue Note, 1976)

With Sister Sledge

- Circle of Love (Atco, 1975)

With Lonnie Smith

- Keep on Lovin' (Groove Merchant, 1976)

With The Spinners

- New and Improved (Atlantic, 1974)
- Pick of the Litter (Atlantic, 1975)
- Yesterday, Today, & Tomorrow (Atlantic, 1977)
- 8 (Atlantic, 1978)
- From Here to Eternally (Atlantic, 1979)

With Rod Stewart

- Soulbook (J Records, 2009)

With The Temptations

- Puzzle People (Gordy, 1969)
- Psychedelic Shack (Motown, 1971)
- Sky's the Limit (Motown, 1971)
- All Directions (Motown, 1972)
- Masterpiece (Motown, 1973)
- The Temptations (Gordy, 1981)

With Stanley Turrentine

- The Man with the Sad Face (Fantasy, 1976)

With Frankie Valli

- Our Day Will Come (Private, 1975)
- Lady Put the Light Out (Private, 1977)

With Dionne Warwick

- Then Came You (Warner Bros., 1975)

With Deniece Williams

- My Melody (Columbia, 1981)
- Niecy (Columbia, 1982)

== Sources ==
- Justman, Paul (2002). Standing in the Shadows of Motown (Motion picture). New York: Artisan Entertainment.
