= The Spinners discography =

- Studio albums: 21
- Live albums: 3
- Compilation albums: 13
- Singles: 59

This is the discography documenting albums and singles released by American R&B/soul male vocal group The Spinners.

== Albums ==
=== Studio albums ===
Year	Album	Peak chart positions				Certifications	Record label
Year	Album	US	US R&B	AUS	CAN	Certifications	Record label
1967	The Original Spinners	—	—	—	—		Motown
1970	2nd Time Around	199	46	—	—		V.I.P.
1973	Spinners	14	1	—	67	RIAA: Gold	Atlantic
1974	Mighty Love	16	1	—	24	RIAA: Platinum	Atlantic
1974	New and Improved	9	1	—	45	RIAA: Gold	Atlantic
1975	Pick of the Litter	8	2	—	31	RIAA: Gold	Atlantic
1976	Happiness Is Being with the Spinners	25	5	—	41	RIAA: Gold	Atlantic
1977	Yesterday, Today, & Tomorrow	26	11	—	36		Atlantic
1978	8	57	34	—	59		Atlantic
1979	From Here to Eternally	165	61	—	—		Atlantic
1979	Dancin' and Lovin'	32	11	87	—		Atlantic
1980	Love Trippin'	53	16	—	—		Atlantic
1981	Labor of Love	128	40	—	—		Atlantic
1981	Can't Shake This Feelin'	196	34	—	—		Atlantic
1982	Grand Slam	167	43	—	—		Atlantic
1984	Cross Fire	—	47	—	—		Atlantic
1985	Lovin' Feelings	—	—	—	—		Mirage
1989	Down to Business	—	82	—	—		Volt
1999	At Their Best	—	—	—	—		Click
2021	Round the Block and Back Again	—	—	—	—		Peak Records
2024	Full Circle	—	—	—	—		Peak Records
"—" denotes a recording that did not chart or was not released in that territory.

=== Live albums ===
Year	Album	Peak chart positions			Certifications	Record label
Year	Album	US	US R&B	CAN	Certifications	Record label
1975	Spinners Live!	20	4	72	RIAA: Gold	Atlantic
1994	In Concert	—	—	—	—	Musicpro
2007	Live!	—	—	—	—	Hallmark
2011	S.O.U.L.	—	—	—	—	Sony
"—" denotes a recording that did not chart.

=== Compilation albums ===
Year	Album	Peak chart positions			Record label
Year	Album	US	US R&B	UK	Record label
1973	The Best of the Spinners	124	37	—	Motown
1977	Smash Hits	—	—	37	Atlantic
1978	The Best of Spinners	115	56	—	Atlantic
1991	A One of a Kind Love Affair: The Anthology	—	—	—	Atlantic
1993	The Very Best of the Spinners	—	—	—	Rhino
1997	The Very Best of the Spinners, Vol. 2	—	—	—	Rhino
2000	Their Early Years	—	—	—	Tri-Phi
2001	Essential Collection	—	—	—	PolyGram UK
2002	The Essentials	—	—	—	WSM
2003	The Chrome Collection	—	—	—	Rhino
2006	The Definitive Soul Collection	—	—	—	Rhino
2007	The Platinum Collection	—	—	—	WSM
2009	Are You Ready for Love? The Very Best of the Detroit Spinners	—	—	50	Rhino
"—" denotes a recording that did not chart or was not released in that territory.

== Singles ==
Year	Single	Peak chart positions						Certifications	Album
Year	Single	US	US R&B	US A/C	AUS	CAN	UK	Certifications	Album
1961	"That's What Girls Are Made For"	27	5	—	—	—	—		The Original Spinners
1961	"Love (I'm So Glad) I Found You"	—	—	—	—	—	—		—N/a
1962	"What Did She Use"	—	—	—	—	—	—		—N/a
1962	"That's How I Am Without You" (with Loe & Joe)	—	—	—	—	—	—		—N/a
1962	"I Got Your Water Boiling, Baby (I'm Gonna Cook Your Goose)"	—	—	—	—	—	—		—N/a
1962	"She Don't Love Me" ^{[A]}	—	—	—	—	—	—		—N/a
1964	"Sweet Thing"	—	—	—	—	—	—		The Original Spinners
1965	"I'll Always Love You"	35	8	—	—	7	—		The Original Spinners
1966	"Truly Yours"	111	16	—	—	97	—		The Original Spinners
1967	"For All We Know"	—	—	—	—	—	—		The Original Spinners
1968	"Bad, Bad Weather (Till You Come Home)"	—	—	—	—	—	—		2nd Time Around
1969	"In My Diary"	—	—	—	—	—	—		2nd Time Around
1970	"Message from a Blackman"	—	—	—	—	—	—		—N/a
1970	"It's a Shame"	14	4	—	—	36	20		2nd Time Around
1970	"We'll Have It Made"	89	20	—	—	—	—		—N/a
1972	"How Could I Let You Get Away" (A-side)	77	14	—	—	—	—		Spinners
1972	"I'll Be Around" (B-side)	3	1	31	79	6	—	RIAA: Gold	Spinners
1972	"Could It Be I'm Falling in Love"	4	1	14	—	12	11	RIAA: Gold	Spinners
1973	"One of a Kind (Love Affair)"	11	1	19	—	16	—	RIAA: Gold	Spinners
1973	"Together We Can Make Such Sweet Music"	91	—	—	—	—	—		2nd Time Around
1973	"Ghetto Child"	29	4	20	—	60	7		Spinners
1974	"Mighty Love (Part 1)"	20	1	—	—	19	—		Mighty Love
1974	"I'm Coming Home"	18	3	—	—	27	—		Mighty Love
1974	"Then Came You" (with Dionne Warwick)	1	2	3	59	7	29	RIAA: Gold	New and Improved
1974	"Love Don't Love Nobody (Part 1)"	15	4	—	—	34	—		Mighty Love
1975	"Living a Little, Laughing a Little"	37	7	—	—	43	—		New and Improved
1975	"Sadie"	54	7	—	—	71	—		New and Improved
1975	"Games People Play"	5	1	2	—	21	—	RIAA: Gold	Pick of the Litter
1975	"Love or Leave"	36	8	—	—	29	—		Pick of the Litter
1976	"Wake Up Susan"	56	11	—	—	—	29		Happiness Is Being with the Spinners
1976	"The Rubberband Man"	2	1	—	20	7	16	RIAA: Gold; BPI: Silver	Happiness Is Being with the Spinners
1977	"You're Throwing a Good Love Away"	43	5	—	—	—	—		Yesterday, Today & Tomorrow
1977	"Me and My Music"	—	39	—	—	—	—		Yesterday, Today & Tomorrow
1977	"Heaven on Earth (So Fine)"	89	23	43	—	—	—		Spinners/8
1978	"Easy Come, Easy Go"	—	46	—	—	—	—		Spinners/8
1978	"If You Wanna Do a Dance"	49	17	—	—	72	—		From Here to Eternally
1979	"Are You Ready for Love"	—	25	—	—	—	—		From Here to Eternally
1979	"I Love the Music"	—	—	—	—	—	—		From Here to Eternally
1979	"Body Language"	103	35	—	—	—	40		Dancin' and Lovin'
1979	"Working My Way Back to You" / "Forgive Me, Girl" (medley)	2	6	5	12	5	1	RIAA: Gold; BPI: Silver	Dancin' and Lovin'
1980	"Cupid" / "I've Loved You for a Long Time" (medley)	4	5	3	17	20	4		Love Trippin'
1980	"Now That You're Mine Again"	—	25	—	—	—	—		Love Trippin'
1980	"I Just Want to Fall in Love"	—	75	—	—	—	—		Love Trippin'
1981	"Yesterday Once More" / "Nothing Remains the Same" (medley)	52	32	45	—	—	—		Labor of Love
1981	"Long Live Soul Music"	—	64	—	—	—	—		Labor of Love
1981	"You Go Your Way (I'll Go Mine)"	110	39	—	—	—	—		Can't Shake This Feelin'
1981	"Love Connection (Raise the Window Down)"	107	68	—	—	—	—		Can't Shake This Feelin'
1982	"Never Thought I'd Fall in Love"	—	95	—	—	—	—		Can't Shake This Feelin'
1982	"Magic in the Moonlight"	—	30	—	—	—	—		Grand Slam'
1982	"Funny How Time Slips Away"	67	43	—	—	—	—		Grand Slam'
1984	"Right or Wrong"	104	22	—	—	—	84		Cross Fire
1985	"She Does"	—	—	—	—	—	—		Lovin' Feelings
1985	"Put Us Together Again"	—	—	—	—	—	—		Lovin' Feelings
1987	"Spaceballs"	—	—	—	—	—	—		Spaceballs
1988	"Brother to Brother"	—	—	—	—	—	—		Twins
1989	"Heal Me"	—	70	—	—	—	—		Down to Business
2021	"Cliché"	—	—	—	—	—	—		'Round the Block and Back Again
2021	"In Holy Matrimony"	—	—	—	—	—	—		'Round the Block and Back Again
2021	"Vivid Memories"	—	—	—	—	—	—		'Round the Block and Back Again
2024	"Easy on Me"	—	—	—	—	—	—		Full Circle
"—" denotes a recording that did not chart or was not released in that territory.

- ^{A} Credited as Bobby Smith & the Spinners.
