= Spinners Live! =

Live album by The Spinners
- Released: 1975
- Recorded: March 5, 1975
- Venues: Latin Casino, Cherry Hill, New Jersey, United States
- Genre: Soul
- Length: 66:19
- Language: English
- Label: Atlantic
- Producer: Thom Bell

The Spinners chronology
New and Improved (1974)	Spinners Live! (1975)	Pick of the Litter (1975)

Spinners Live! is a 1975 live album from American soul act The Spinners. The release was a modest commercial success and has received positive critical assessment.

== Reception ==
The editors of AllMusic Guide scored Spinners Live! four out of five stars, with reviewer Andrew Hamilton particularly praising the compact disc re-release for its sound quality, summing up his review that this release is "a good, if not great, live album where the highs make up for the lows".

== Track listing ==
1. "Fascinating Rhythm" (George Gershwin and Ira Gershwin) – 2:34
2. "I've Got to Make It on My Own" (Bruce Hawes and Charles Simmons) – 4:04
3. "Living a Little, Laughing a Little" (Thom Bell and Linda Creed – 4:38
4. "One of a Kind (Love Affair)" (Joseph Jefferson) – 3:36
5. "Then Came You" (Sherman Marshall and Phillip T. Pugh) – 4:01
6. "Sadie" (Hawes, Jefferson, and Simmons) – 7:33
7. "How Could I Let You Get Away" (Yvette Davis) – 7:06
8. "Could It Be I'm Falling in Love" (Melvin Steals and Mervin Steals) – 4:26
9. Superstar Medley – 11:31
  - "It's Not Unusual" (Gordon Mills and Les Reed)
  - "Don't Mess with Bill" (Smokey Robinson)
  - "Paper Doll" (Johnny Black)
  - "Stop! In the Name of Love" (Holland–Dozier–Holland)
  - "If I Didn't Care" (Jack Lawrence)
  - "Hound Dog" (Jerry Leiber and Mike Stoller)
  - "Hello Dolly" (Jerry Herman)
10. "Love Don't Love Nobody" (Part 1) (Jefferson and Simmons) – 4:51
11. "Love Don't Love Nobody" (Part 2) (Jefferson and Simmons) – 4:48
12. "Mighty Love" (Hawes, Jefferson, and Simmons) – 8:02

Note: songs 10 and 11 are a single track on the compact disc release.

== Personnel ==
The Spinners

- Henry Fambrough – tenor/baritone vocals
- Billy Henderson – tenor/baritone vocals
- Pervis Jackson – bass vocals
- Bobby Smith – tenor/baritone vocals
- Philippé Wynne – tenor/baritone vocals

Additional musicians (see MFSB)

- Linda Creed – vocals on "Then Came You"
- Bill Neale – guitar
- Ted Smith – drums
- Rodney Vorhis – bass guitar
- Rodney Stepp – piano, organ
- Larry Washington – congas, percussion
- Tommy Williams – guitar

Technical personnel

- Thom Bell – production
- Ken Duncan – mastering at Kendun Recorders
- Jim Gaines – mixing engineering
- Jim "Reds" Gallagher – recording engineering
- John Golden – mastering on CD re-release
- Maurice King – arrangement, conducting
- Win Koots – mixing engineering
- Don Murray – recording engineering
- Eric Porter – photography
- Mark "Bear" Porter – liner notes
- PorterWagnerDesign – design on CD re-release
- William Rawley – photography
- Joe Tarsia – recording engineering
- Ilene Wagner – photography
- Wayne Wilfong – engineering

== Sales and chart performance ==
Domestically, Spinners Live! reached 20 on the Billboard 200 and fourth place on the R&B charts. In Canada, it topped out at 72, according to RPM. The album was certified gold by March 1976. Billboard ranked this album the 35th best-selling soul album of 1976.

== See also ==
- List of 1975 albums
