= The Best of the Spinners (1973 album) =

Greatest hits album by The Spinners
- Released: 1973
- Recorded: Various sessions from 1961 to 1970
- Genre: Soul
- Language: English
- Label: Motown
- Producer: Johnny Bristol, Harvey Fuqua, Berry Gordy, George Gordy, Robert Gordy, Ivy Jo Hunter, Clay McMurray, Smokey Robinson, William "Mickey" Stevenson, Allen Story, and Stevie Wonder

The Spinners chronology
Spinners (1973)	The Best of the Spinners (1973)	Mighty Love (1974)

The Spinners compilations chronology
The Best of the Spinners (1973)	Smash Hits (1977)

The Best of the Spinners is a 1973 greatest hits album from American Philly soul vocal group The Spinners, released on Motown.

== Recording and release ==
This is the first Spinners compilation and represents the string of recordings that the group made for Motown from 1964 to 1970. The group had persistent difficulties recording with the label on a consistent schedule, spending over a year signed to Motown before their first recording session and only producing two studio albums in that time. The group's contract expired in 1972 and most of the band members decided to leave Motown, but vocalist G. C. Cameron had married Gwen Gordy and had a different contract than the rest of the performers, so he departed the Spinners and encouraged them to add Philippé Wynne; the renewed line-up recorded a string of successful albums produced by Thom Bell for Atlantic Records for the next six years.

== Reception ==
A review for Billboard calls this collection "smoothly stimulating tunes" and recommended that retailers bought the record due to the band's shift to Atlantic and current hits upon release.

== Track listing ==
1. "Together We Can Make Such Sweet Music" – 3:04
2. "It's a Shame" – 3:10
3. "I've Got to Find Myself a Brand New Baby" – 2:33
4. "I'll Always Love You" – 2:43
5. "We'll Have It Made" – 3:26
6. "Bad, Bad Weather (Till You Come Home)" – 2:26
7. "My Whole World Ended (The Moment You Left Me)" – 3:35
8. "Truly Yours" – 3:00
9. "Sweet Thing" – 2:40
10. "O-o-h Child" – 3:13

== Chart performance ==
The Best of the Spinners reached 37 on the R&B chart and peaked at 124 on the Billboard 200.

== See also ==
- List of 1973 albums
