= 2nd Time Around (album) =

Studio album by the Spinners
- Released: October 1970
- Recorded: 1967–70
- Genre: R&B, soul
- Length: 36:03
- Label: V.I.P.
- Producer: Johnny Bristol, Harvey Fuqua, Ivy Jo Hunter, Stevie Wonder, Clay McMurray, Allen Story, George Gordy, Robert Gordy

The Spinners chronology
The Original Spinners (1967)	2nd Time Around (1970)	Spinners (1973)

Professional ratings
Review scores
Source	Rating
AllMusic	3.5/5 stars

2nd Time Around is a studio album recorded by American R&B group the Spinners, released in October 1970 on Motown's V.I.P. label (their second overall). This is their only album with G. C. Cameron (who replaced Edgar Edwards from the previous album and was replaced by Philippé Wynne on their next album). This is also the group's last album made while they were under contract with Motown Records; by the time of their next album, they had signed at Atlantic Records.

== History ==
The album includes the first of the group's string of 1970s' hits, the Stevie Wonder produced "It's a Shame", which was their first U.S. pop top-twenty (and third R&B top-ten) hit, as well as most of the group's singles released between 1968 and 1971 (the exception being the original version of "Message from a Black Man" and their second hit, "We'll Have It Made", which was their last hit – and last single – released while they were under contract with Motown).

Also in 1973, the label released a second version of "It's a Shame"'s B-side, "Together We Can Make Such Sweet Music", which reached No. 91 on the Billboard Hot 100 chart. The album was the first of fourteen straight studio albums to make the Billboard pop albums chart, barely squeezing in at No. 199 (and their first R&B albums charter, entering the top fifty at No. 46).

== Track listing ==
Side one
No.	Title	Writer(s)	Producer(s)	Length
1.	"It's a Shame"	Stevie Wonder, Lee Garrett, Syreeta Wright	Stevie Wonder	3:12
2.	"I've Got to Find Myself a Brand New Baby"	Suzanne de Passe, Marv Johnson, Johnny Bristol, Harvey Fuqua	Harvey Fuqua, Johnny Bristol	2:33
3.	"Together We Can Make Such Sweet Music"	Richard Drapkin, Marty Coleman	Clay McMurray	2:55
4.	"Bad, Bad Weather (Till You Come Home)"	Allen Story, Lawrence Brown, Horgay Gordy	George Gordy	2:29
5.	"Pay Them No Mind"	Richard Ahlert, Bobby Scott	Ivy Jo Hunter	2:59
6.	"My Lady Love"	Fuqua, Arthur Scott, Vernon Williams	Harvey Fuqua	4:24

Side two
No.	Title	Writer(s)	Producer(s)	Length
7.	"Souly Ghost"	Story, H. Gordy, Brown	George Gordy, Lawrence Brown	2:28
8.	"O-o-h Child"	Stan Vincent	Johnny Bristol	3:05
9.	"In My Diary"	Michael Angelo Graham, Mark Silverman	Harvey Fuqua, Johnny Bristol	2:45
10.	"My Whole World Ended (The Moment You Left Me)"	Bristol, Fuqua, Jimmy Roach, Pam Sawyer	Johnny Bristol	3:20
11.	"(She's Gonna Love Me) At Sundown"	Robert Gordy, Thomas Kemp	Robert Gordy	2:25
12.	"Can Sing a Rainbow/Love Is Blue" (medley)	Arthur Hamilton, Bryan Blackburn, Pierre Cour, André Popp	Johnny Bristol	3:45

== Personnel ==
- Billy Henderson, Bobby Smith, G.C. Cameron, Henry Fambrough, and Pervis Jackson – vocals
- The Andantes (Jackie Hicks, Marlene Barrow, and Louvain Demps) – backing vocals (some tracks)
- Johnny Bristol, Harvey Fuqua – producer
- Stevie Wonder – producer, drums ("It's a Shame")
- George Gordy – producer
- Robert Gordy – producer
- Allen Story – producer
- Clay McMurray – producer
- Ivy Jo Hunter – producer
- Wade Marcus – arranger
- Paul Riser – arranger
- Willie Shorter – arranger
- The Funk Brothers – instrumentation

== Charts ==
=== Weekly charts ===
Chart (1970)	Peak
U.S. Billboard Top LPs	199
U.S. Billboard Top Soul LPs	46

=== Singles ===
Year	Single	Peak chart positions		
Year	Single	US	US R&B	UK
1970	"It's a Shame"	14	4	20
1973	"Together We Can Make Such Sweet Music"	91	—	—
