= New and Improved (The Spinners album) =

Studio album by The Spinners
- Released: December 1974
- Studio: Sigma Sound, Philadelphia
- Genre: R&B
- Length: 34:56
- Label: Atlantic
- Producer: Thom Bell

The Spinners chronology
Mighty Love (1974)	New and Improved (1974)	Spinners Live! (1975)

The Spinners studio albums chronology
Mighty Love (1974)	New and Improved (1974)	Pick of the Litter (1975)

Professional ratings
Review scores
Source	Rating
AllMusic	4/5 stars
Christgau's Record Guide	B
Tom Hull – on the Web	B+

New and Improved is the fifth album by American R&B group The Spinners, released in December 1974 on the Atlantic label. Like the Spinners' two previous Atlantic albums, New and Improved was produced by Thom Bell and recorded at Sigma Sound Studios in Philadelphia.

== History ==
New and Improved became the Spinners' third consecutive R&B albums chart-topper and reached #9 on the Billboard 200, their first top 10 album on this chart. The album includes "Then Came You", featuring Dionne Warwick and the group's only single to top the Billboard Hot 100 (it was denied the top spot on the R&B chart by Kool & the Gang's "Higher Plane"), and the top 10 R&B singles "Living A Little, Laughing A Little" and "Sadie".

Track 3 titled "Then Came You", a duet with Dionne Warwick, was recorded first and released as a single in July 1974. The song was recorded in three stages. The rhythm track was recorded at Sigma Studios in Philadelphia. Then the lead vocals were recorded at the Beach Boys Studio in Los Angeles. Additional vocals, strings and horns were then added in Philadelphia. The song also appears on Warwick's album of the same title which was released in 1975.

Track 6 titled "Sadie" was covered by R. Kelly on his 1993 debut solo album 12 Play.

== Track listing ==
Side one
No.	Title	Writer(s)	Length
1.	"Sitting on Top of the World"	Charles Simmons, Bruce Hawes, Joseph B. Jefferson	4:42
2.	"Smile, We Have Each Other"	Simmons, Hawes, Jefferson	4:30
3.	"Then Came You" (with Dionne Warwick)	Sherman Marshall, Phillip Pugh	3:59
4.	"There's No One Like You"	Simmons, Hawes	4:16

Side two
No.	Title	Writer(s)	Length
5.	"Living a Little, Laughing a Little"	Thom Bell, Linda Creed	5:03
6.	"Sadie"	Simmons, Hawes, Jefferson	5:26
7.	"Lazy Susan"	Bell, Creed	3:34
8.	"I've Got to Make It on My Own"	Simmons, Hawes	3:26

== Personnel ==
Credits adapted from the liner notes of New and Improved.

Musicians

- Billy Henderson, Bobby Smith, Philippé Wynne, Henry Fambrough, Pervis Jackson – vocals
- Dionne Warwick – vocals on "Then Came You", track 3
- Linda Creed, Barbara Ingram, Carla L. Benson, Yvette Benson – backing vocals
- Tony Bell, Bobby Eli, Don Murray – guitar
- Thom Bell – keyboards
- Walter Pfeil – harp
- Bob Babbitt – bass guitar
- Don Renaldo – strings
- Andrew Smith – drums
- Larry Washington – congas, bongos
- Jack Faith – alto saxophone, flute
- Rocco Bene, Bobby Hartzell – trumpet
- Joe DeAngelis, Milt Phibbs, Danny Davis – French horn
- Freddie Joiner, Bobby Moore, Richie Genovese, Ed Cascarella – trombone
- Tom Kennery – steel guitar

Technical

- Don Murray, Jim Gallagher – recording engineer

== Charts ==
Chart (1974)	Peak
U.S. Billboard Top LPs	9
U.S. Billboard Top Soul LPs	1

Singles

Year	Single	Peak chart positions			
Year	Single	US	US R&B	US A/C	UK
1974	"Then Came You"	1	2	3	29
1975	"Living a Little, Laughing a Little"	37	7	—	—
1975	"Sadie"	54	7	—	—

== See also ==
- List of number-one R&B albums of 1975 (U.S.)
