= The Original Spinners =

Studio album by The Spinners
- Released: August 1967
- Recorded: Early 1961 to mid-1967
- Genre: R&B
- Length: 32:24
- Label: Motown
- Producers: Harvey Fuqua, Ivy Jo Hunter, William "Mickey" Stevenson, Smokey Robinson, Berry Gordy

The Spinners chronology
The Original Spinners (1967)	2nd Time Around (1970)

Professional ratings
Review scores
Source	Rating
Allmusic	3/5 stars

The Original Spinners (released in the UK as The Detroit Spinners) is the 1967 debut album by The Spinners for Motown Records. The LP includes the group's earliest singles on the label (such as Top 20 R&B hits "I'll Always Love You" and "Truly Yours"), as well as their first ever single "That's What Girls Are Made For" (which was released on the already defunct Tri-Phi Record label). None of the group's other material from Tri-Phi appear on this album.

The lineup on the cover features Bobby Smith, Edgar "Chico" Edwards, Henry Fambrough, Billy Henderson, and Pervis Jackson. Former member George Dixon (who is not pictured on the album because of his departure back in 1963) actually only appears on "That's What Girls Are Made For", The other tracks all feature Edwards. This is both Dixon's and Edwards' only appearance on an Spinners studio album (Edwards would leave the group soon after this production of this album was completed).

The album notes state that members Bobby Smith and Edgar "Chico" Edwards share most of the lead vocals on stage. However other than "Tomorrow May Never Come", where he does the lead vocal in unison with Smith (who also leads all the remaining tracks on this album) and Henry Fambrough, Edwards does not have any other leads on this album.

== Track listing ==
Side One
No.	Title	Writer(s)	Producer(s)	Length
1.	"That's What Girls Are Made For"	Harvey Fuqua, Gwen Gordy Fuqua	Harvey Fuqua	2:57
2.	"I'll Always Love You"	William "Mickey" Stevenson, Ivy Jo Hunter	William "Mickey" Stevenson, Ivy Jo Hunter	2:43
3.	"Truly Yours"	Ivy Jo Hunter, William "Mickey" Stevenson	Ivy Jo Hunter, William "Mickey" Stevenson	2:58
4.	"For All We Know"	Sam M. Lewis, J. Fred Coots	Ivy Jo Hunter	2:53
5.	"It Hurts To Be in Love"	Berry Gordy, Jr., Robert Gordy	Berry Gordy, Jr.	2:22
6.	"Tomorrow May Never Come"	Harvey Fuqua, Thomas Kemp	Harvey Fuqua	2:27

Side Two
No.	Title	Writer(s)	Producer(s)	Length
7.	"Sweet Thing"	William "Mickey" Stevenson	William "Mickey" Stevenson	2:40
8.	"I Cross My Heart"	Ivy Jo Hunter	Ivy Jo Hunter	2:57
9.	"Where Is That Girl"	Harvey Fuqua, Johnny Bristol	Harvey Fuqua	2:59
10.	"Like a Good Man Should"	William "Smokey" Robinson, Warren Moore	William "Smokey" Robinson	2:15
11.	"How Can I"	Harvey Fuqua, Gwen Gordy Fuqua	Harvey Fuqua	2:38
12.	"I Just Can't Help But Feel the Pain"	Clyde Wilson, Harvey Fuqua	Harvey Fuqua	2:35

== Personnel ==
- Bobby Smith – lead tenor and backing vocals
- Henry Fambrough – co-lead ("Tomorrow May Never Come") and baritone backing vocals
- Billy Henderson – second tenor backing vocals
- Pervis Jackson – bass backing vocals
- Edgar "Chico" Edwards – co-lead ("Tomorrow May Never Come") and tenor background vocals (all tracks except "That's What Girls Are Made For")
- George Dixon – backing vocals ("That's What Girls Are Made For" only)
- The Andantes (Jackie Hicks, Marlene Barrow, and Louvain Demps) – backing vocals (some tracks)
- Harvey Fuqua – producer, album producer
- Ivy Jo Hunter, William "Mickey" Stevenson – producer, album producer
- Berry Gordy, Jr. – producer
- Smokey Robinson – producer
- The Funk Brothers – instrumentation

== Charts ==
Singles

Year	Single	Peak chart positions	
Year	Single	US	US R&B
1961	"That's What Girls Are For"	27	5
1965	"I'll Always Love You"	35	8
1966	"Truly Yours"	111	16
