= At Their Best (Spinners album) =

Studio album by The Spinners
- Released: April 23, 1999
- Genre: Soul
- Length: 49:45
- Language: English
- Label: Click Records

The Spinners chronology
The Very Best of the Spinners, Vol. 2 (1997)	At Their Best (1999)	The Spinners: Their Early Years (2000)

At Their Best is a 1999 studio album by American soul music vocal group The Spinners, released on Click Records. This album re-records several of the band's hits and is their first new recordings in a decade; this album would also be their last new material until 2021's 'Round the Block and Back Again.

== Reception ==
Editors at AllMusic Guide scored At Their Best two out of five stars, with critic Raymond McKinney writing that "none of it truly recaptures the fire of the group's heyday, although their harmonies remain impeccable".

== Track listing ==
1. "This Place Hotel" (Michael Jackson) – 4:58
2. "Why Me" (Andre Allen) – 4:46
3. "Can't Help Lovin' You" (Doug Shawe) – 5:08
4. "I'll Be Around" (Thom Bell and Phil Hurtt) – 4:26
5. "Do I Do" (Stevie Wonder)) – 6:17
6. "That's Why I Love You" (Mark Nelson) – 4:32
7. "Turn Off the Lights" (Kenny Gamble and Leon Huff) – 5:27
8. "Checklist" (Gary Brown) – 3:38
9. "Neither One of Us (Wants to Be the First to Say Goodbye)" (Jim Weatherly) – 4:22
10. "Love Don't Love Nobody" (Roy Brown, Joseph B. Jefferson, and Charles Simmons) – 6:11

== Personnel ==
The Spinners

- John Edwards – tenor vocals, backing vocals
- Henry Fambrough – baritone vocals; backing vocals
- Billy Henderson – tenor vocals, backing vocals
- Pervis Jackson – bass vocals, backing vocals
- Bobby Smith – tenor vocals, backing vocals

Additional musicians

- Ollie E. Brown – drums, percussion, drum programming
- Todd Burns – keyboards
- John Fluker – piano
- Phillip Ingram – backing vocals, vocal arrangement
- Paul Jackson, Jr. – guitar
- Roman Johnson – keyboards, synthesizer bass, arrangement, drum programming
- Valorie Jones – backing vocals, vocal arrangement
- Kool Moe Dee – rapping
- Cornelius Mims – keyboards, synthesizer bass
- Leon Mobley – percussion
- Grant Nicholas – keyboards
- Bruce Paulson – horn
- Nathan Watts – bass guitar
- Stevie Wonder – harmonica, liner notes
- Yo-Yo – rapping

Technical personnel

- Craig Booker – drum programming
- Dick Clark – liner notes
- Joseph Curiale – horn arrangement
- Chuck Cymone – drum programming, keyboards, rhythm arrangement
- Timothy Fielding – photography
- Berry Gordy, Jr. – liner notes
- Steve Hallquist – engineering, mixing
- Fortune Reed – sequencing arrangement
- Michael Schuman – mixing
- Robert Slack – horn
- Mark V. – engineering
- Ron Wong – art direction, design
- Benjamin F. Wright – arrangement

== See also ==
- List of 1999 albums
