= Ghetto Child =

Single by The Spinners

from the album Spinners
- B-side: "We Belong Together"
- Released: July 1973
- Recorded: 1972–1973
- Studio: Sigma Sound, Philadelphia, Pennsylvania
- Genre: Philadelphia soul, R&B
- Length: 3:47
- Label: Atlantic
- Songwriter(s): Linda Creed; Thom Bell
- Producer(s): Thom Bell

The Spinners singles chronology
"One of a Kind (Love Affair)" (1973)	"Ghetto Child" (1973)	"Mighty Love" (1973)

"Ghetto Child" is a 1973 song recorded by American R&B music group the Spinners (known as "Detroit Spinners" in the UK) for the Atlantic label. It was written by Thom Bell and Linda Creed. It was produced by Bell, and recorded at Philadelphia's Sigma Sound Studios with the house band MFSB providing the backing instrumentation. It is notable for being one of few songs that all three main leads, Bobby Smith, Philippé Wynne and Henry Fambrough sing lead (Wynne and Fambrough on the verses and Smith on the song's bridge). Although some think the song focuses on racial injustice broadly and the injustice of the 1967 Detroit Riot more specifically, the lyrics suggest that the song may be about intra-racial discrimination—the song is written from the perspective of a black child who is derided not (primarily) due to his skin-color but due to his class status.

The group's fifth hit at Atlantic, the song peaked at number four on the R&B chart and number twenty-nine on the Billboard Pop Singles chart.

== Personnel ==
- Lead vocals by Philippé Wynne, Henry Fambrough and Bobby Smith
- Background vocals by Bobby Smith, Philippé Wynne, Pervis Jackson, Henry Fambrough and Billy Henderson
- Additional background vocals by Linda Creed and The Sweethearts of Sigma (Barbara Ingram, Carla Benson, and Evette Benton)
- Instrumentation by MFSB

== Chart history ==
Chart (1972)	Peak position
US Billboard Hot 100	29
US Best Selling Soul Singles	4
US Easy Listening	20
UK Singles Chart	7
