= The Spinners: Their Early Years =

Compilation album by The Spinners
- Released: 2000
- Recorded: May 1961 – May 1963
- Genre: Pop, R&B, doo-wop
- Label: Tri-Phi/Hardye; TP 1001
- Producer: Harvey Fuqua

The Spinners chronology
At Their Best (1999)	The Spinners: Their Early Years (2000)	Essential Collection (2001)

Professional ratings
Review scores
Source	Rating
AllMusic	4.5/5 stars

The Spinners: Their Early Years is a compilation album featuring The Spinners and other various artist that were signed to the Tri-Phi Records/Harvey Records label(s) from 1961 to 1963 (when it was sold to Motown Records). It contains the five singles (and their B-sides) that the group made while signed at Tri-Phi (which was to be compiled into an album that was cancelled due to the label closing), and a few tracks where they sang backing vocals for other acts on both labels. The album also contains songs performed by various other acts that didn't make the transition to Motown.

While Henry Fambrough remained a member of the group during the whole period, he was not featured on their last two singles for the label, as he was serving in the U.S. Armed Services at the time the tracks were recorded (1962–1963). Edgar "Chico" Edwards would fill in while he was away; he would later permanently replace George Dixon when he left the group just prior to their signing at Motown Records. This albums contains all the leads (and recorded material) performed by Dixon, and most of the leads performed by Edwards, though, like most of their Motown material, Bobby Smith was their main lead singer.

This album also marks the first appearance of Ann Bogan, singing here with the Challengers, who would later replace Gladys Horton in the Marvelettes and be a part of the New Birth subgroup, Love, Peace & Happiness along with Leslie and Melvin Wilson.

== Track listing ==
All selections produced by Harvey Fuqua.

All songs written by Harvey Fuqua and/or Gwen Gordy Fuqua*, unless otherwise noted.

1. "That's What Girls Are Made For" *
2. "Sud Buster" *
3. "Whistling 'bout You" (Harvey Fuqua, Mel Kanar, Marvin Gaye) – Harvey (Fuqua) & The Spinners
4. "Heebie Jeebies" (Fuqua, Bobby Smith)
5. "Love (I'm So Glad) I Found You" *
6. "Come On and Answer Me" * – Harvey & The Spinners
7. "What Did She Use" (Fuqua, Reese Palmer, Berry Gordy, Jr.)
8. "She Loves Me So" * – Harvey & The Spinners
9. "I've Been Hurt" *
10. "I Got Your Water Boiling, Baby (I'm Gonna Cook Your Goose)" *
11. "Too Young, Too Much, Too Soon" *
12. "That's How I Am Without You" (Fuqua, Geneva Harkness, William Davis) – Loe & Joe feat. The Spinners
13. "Itching for My Baby (But I'm Afraid to Scratch)" *
14. "She Don't Love Me" *
15. "It's Been A Long Long Time (A Long Time)" (Fuqua, The Five Quails) – The Five Quails
16. "Never Felt Like This Before" (The Five Quails, William Strawbridge) – The Five Quails
17. "Get To School On Time" (Fuqua, The Five Quails) – The Five Quails
18. "I Thought" – The Five Quails
19. "Over The Hump" – The Five Quails
20. "My Love" * – The Five Quails
21. "Honey, Honey, Honey" (The Challengers) – The Challengers
22. "Stay" (The Challengers) – The Challengers
23. "Everyday" (Ann Bogan) – The Challengers
24. "I Hear An Echo" (Fuqua, Bogan, Martin Coleman) – The Challengers
25. "Memories Of You" – Harvey

== Canceled album track list ==
=== Side one ===
1. "That's What Girls Are Made For"
2. "Sud Buster"
3. "Heebie Jeebies"
4. "Love (I'm So Glad) I Found You"
5. "What Did She Use"

=== Side two ===
1. "I've Been Hurt"
2. "I Got Your Water Boiling, Baby (I'm Gonna Cook Your Goose)"
3. "Too Young, Too Much, Too Soon"
4. "Itching for My Baby (But I'm Afraid to Scratch)"
5. "She Don't Love Me"

== Personnel ==
Instrumentation by various session artist including the Funk Brothers and Junior Walker & the All Stars

=== The Spinners personnel (tracks 1–14) ===
- Bobby Smith: vocals
- George W. Dixon: vocals
- Edgar "Chico" Edwards: vocals (some tracks)
- Henry Fambrough: vocals (some tracks)
- Billy Henderson: vocals
- Pervis Jackson: vocals
- Harvey Fuqua: producer, vocals (tracks 3, 6, 8, 25)
- The Andantes (Jackie Hicks, Marlene Barrow, and Louvain Demps): background vocals (some tracks)

=== Various artist personnel (tracks 12, 15–24) ===
- Loe & Joe (Loraine "Loe" Rudolph and Joseph "Joe" Charles Murphy): vocals (track 12)
- The Five Quails (Curtis Williams, Billy Strawbridge, Billy Fulgham, Art Kirkpatrick, Harold Sudberry, Donald Brown, and James Williams): vocals (tracks 15–20)
- The Challengers (Ann Bogan, Dorothy Hutchinson, and James Hutchinson): vocals (tracks 21–24)
- The Andantes: background vocals (some tracks)
