= Mighty Love (song) =

Single by The Spinners

from the album Mighty Love
- A-side: "Mighty Love – Pt. 1"
- B-side: "Mighty Love – Pt. 2"
- Released: December 1973
- Studio: Sigma Sound, Philadelphia, Pennsylvania
- Genre: Philadelphia soul; R&B
- Length: 3:17 (single version); 4:55 (album version)
- Label: Atlantic
- Songwriters: Joseph B. Jefferson; Bruce Hawes; Charles Simmons
- Producer: Thom Bell

The Spinners singles chronology
"Ghetto Child" (1973)	"Mighty Love" (1973)	"I'm Coming Home" (1974)

"Mighty Love" is a 1973 song recorded by the American R&B vocal group The Spinners (known as "Detroit Spinners" in the UK). The song was co-written by Joseph B. Jefferson, Bruce Hawes and Charles Simmons and was produced by Thom Bell.

== Background ==
Recorded at Philly's Sigma Sound Studios, the house band MFSB provided the backing. Bobbie Smith and Philippé Wynne rotate lead vocals during the first half of the song, with Wynne taking over completely for the final two and half minutes. During live performances by the Spinners, the song was often used to showcase Wynne's exceptional ad-lib ability.

== Chart performance ==
When it was released as the lead single from the album of the same name, the song was split into two parts and "Mighty Love – Pt.1" became another hit for the group, holding the number one spot on the US R&B singles chart for two weeks in March 1974 while also reaching number 20 on the pop singles chart.

== Personnel ==
- Lead vocals by Bobbie Smith and Philippé Wynne
- Background vocals by Bobbie Smith, Philippé Wynne, Pervis Jackson, Henry Fambrough and Billy Henderson
- Additional background vocals by Linda Creed and The Sweethearts of Sigma (Barbara Ingram, Carla Benson, and Evette Benton)
- Instrumentation by MFSB

== Chart history ==
Chart (1974)	Peak position
U.S. Billboard Hot 100	20
U.S. Billboard Hot Soul Singles	1

== Cover versions ==
Todd Rundgren (A Cappella, 1985) and Phil Perry (A Mighty Love, 2007) are among artists who have covered the song.
