= Sadie (The Spinners song) =

1975 single by The Spinners

Single by The Spinners

from the album New and Improved
- B-side: "Lazy Susan"
- Released: April 3, 1975
- Recorded: 1974
- Studio: Sigma Sound, Philadelphia, Pennsylvania
- Genre: R&B
- Length: 3:34 (single version) 5:24 (album version)
- Label: Atlantic
- Songwriters: Joseph B. Jefferson; Bruce Hawes; Charles Simmons
- Producer: Thom Bell

The Spinners singles chronology
"Living a Little, Laughing a Little" (1975)	"Sadie" (1975)	"Games People Play" (1975)

"Sadie" is a song recorded by the American R&B vocal group The Spinners (known as "Detroit Spinners" in the UK). The song was written and produced by Joseph B. Jefferson, Bruce Hawes and Charles Simmons. Recorded at Philly's Sigma Sound Studios and released as the third single from their 1974 New and Improved album on Atlantic Records, "Sadie" would chart at number #7 on the U.S. R&B Singles Chart, their 10th consecutive Top 10 Atlantic single on the chart (and their 13th overall). It also reached the number #54 position on Billboard Pop Singles chart.

== Personnel ==
- Lead vocals by Philippé Wynne
- Background vocals by Bobby Smith, Philippé Wynne, Pervis Jackson, Henry Fambrough and Billy Henderson
- Additional background vocals by Linda Creed, and the Sigma Sweethearts, Barbara Ingram, Carla Benson and Evette Benton
- Instrumentation by MFSB

== Charts ==
Chart (1975)	Peak position
Canadian Single Chart	71
US Billboard Hot 100	54
US Best Selling Soul Singles (Billboard)	7
