= Truly Yours (The Spinners song) =

1966 song and single

Single by The Spinners

from the album The Original Spinners
- B-side: "Where Is That Girl"
- Released: March 24, 1966
- Recorded: 1966; Hitsville USA (Studio A) (Detroit, Michigan)
- Genre: Soul; R&B; pop
- Length: 3:07
- Label: Motown; M 1093
- Songwriter(s): William "Mickey" Stevenson; Ivy Jo Hunter
- Producer(s): William "Mickey" Stevenson; Ivy Jo Hunter

The Spinners singles chronology
"I'll Always Love You" (1965)	"Truly Yours" (1966)	"For All We Know" (1967)

"Truly Yours"

Song by The Temptations
- Released: October 17, 1986
- Recorded: Hitsville USA (Studio A); 1967
- Genre: Soul; R&B; pop
- Length: 3:11
- Label: Gordy
- Songwriter(s): William "Mickey" Stevenson; Ivy Jo Hunter
- Producer(s): Ivy Jo Hunter

"Truly Yours" is a 1966 song and single by the Spinners for the Motown label. Co-written and produced by William "Mickey" Stevenson and Ivy Jo Hunter, the single became the Detroit-reared group's second to chart on the company label, and the fourth to chart altogether. It was also the last to chart in the 1960s and last to chart for the group until "It's a Shame". The single peaked at 11 on the Billboard Bubbling Under Hot 100 chart. On the Billboard R&B singles chart, "Truly Yours" did much better, reaching the Top 20, peaking at number 16.

During this period, as Motown treated the group as a second-tier signing, the label released one single a year from 1964 to 1969. Thus commercial success would elude the group until 1970.

The song was covered in 1967 by the Temptations and Hunter himself. The Temptations version was unreleased until 1986, while Hunter's version, backed by the Temptations, wouldn't be released until January 12, 2005.

== Personnel ==
=== The Spinners version ===
- Lead vocals by Bobby Smith
- Background vocals by Bobby Smith, Chico Edwards, Pervis Jackson, Henry Fambrough and Billy Henderson
- Additional background vocals by the Andantes
- Instrumentation by the Funk Brothers

=== The Temptations version ===
- Lead vocals by David Ruffin
- Background vocals by Eddie Kendricks, Melvin Franklin, Paul Williams, and Otis Williams
- Instrumentation by the Funk Brothers.

=== Ivy Jo Hunter version ===
- Lead vocals by Ivy Jo Hunter
- Background vocals by the Temptations: Eddie Kendricks, Melvin Franklin, Paul Williams, David Ruffin, and Otis Williams
- Instrumentation by the Funk Brothers.

== Charts ==
Chart (1966)	Peak position
US Billboard Bubbling Under the Hot 100	111
US Hot Rhythm & Blues Singles (Billboard)	16

== External sites ==
Video on YouTube
