= Mighty Love =

Studio album by The Spinners
- Released: January 1974
- Studio: Sigma Sound, Philadelphia, Pennsylvania
- Genre: Philadelphia soul; R&B
- Length: 37:12
- Label: Atlantic
- Producer: Thom Bell

The Spinners chronology
The Best of the Spinners (1973)	Mighty Love (1974)	New and Improved (1974)

The Spinners studio albums chronology
Spinners (1973)	Mighty Love (1974)	New and Improved (1974)

Professional ratings
Review scores
Source	Rating
AllMusic	4/5 stars
Christgau's Record Guide	B+
Tom Hull – on the Web	B+

Mighty Love is the fourth studio album recorded by American R&B group The Spinners, released in January 1974 on the Atlantic label. It was the Spinners' second album for Atlantic and, like their breakthrough Atlantic debut Spinners, was produced by Thom Bell at Sigma Sound Studios in Philadelphia.

== History ==
The album topped the R&B albums chart, their second consecutive overall to do so. It also reached number 16 on the Billboard 200. The single edit of the title track became the group's fourth R&B chart-topper, while "I'm Coming Home" peaked at number 3—both singles also reached the top 20 on the Billboard Hot 100, as did an edited version of the seven-minute slow jam "Love Don't Love Nobody", which has become a quiet storm radio classic.

== Track listing ==
All tracks are written by Charles Simmons, Joseph B. Jefferson and Bruce Hawes, except where noted.

Side one
No.	Title	Writer(s)	Length
1.	"Since I Been Gone"		4:20
2.	"Ain't No Price on Happiness"		4:05
3.	"I'm Glad You Walked into My Life"		4:55
4.	"I'm Coming Home"	Thom Bell, Linda Creed	4:11

Side two
No.	Title	Writer(s)	Length
5.	"He'll Never Love You Like I Do"	Bunny Sigler, James Sigler, Morris Bailey	3:56
6.	"Love Has Gone Away"		3:35
7.	"Love Don't Love Nobody"	Simmons, Jefferson	7:12
8.	"Mighty Love"		4:58

Notes on track 5:

- Some album copies credit the song to Simmons, Hawes, and Jefferson while single copies of "I'm Coming Home" credit the song to just B. Sigler and Bailey.
- Lead singer Philippé Wynne would later release a cover version in 1984 with the title "He Don't Love You", though it was credited to Gamble & Huff.

== Personnel ==
- Billy Henderson, Bobby Smith, Philippé Wynne, Henry Fambrough, Pervis Jackson – vocals
- Linda Creed, Barbara Ingram, Carla Benson, Evette Benton – backing vocals
- MFSB – instrumentation

== Charts ==
Chart (1974)	Peak
U.S. Billboard Top LPs	16
U.S. Billboard Top Soul LPs	1

Singles

Year	Single	Peak chart positions	
Year	Single	US	US R&B
1974	"Mighty Love (Part 1)"	20	1
1974	"I'm Coming Home"	18	3
1974	"Love Don't Love Nobody (Part 1)"	15	4

== See also ==
- List of number-one R&B albums of 1974 (U.S.)
