= Together We Can Make Such Sweet Music =

Single by The Spinners

from the album 2nd Time Around
- A-side: "It's a Shame" (1st single)
- B-side: "Bad, Bad Weather (Till You Come Home)" (2nd single)
- Released: June 11, 1970 (1st single); April, 1973 (2nd single)
- Recorded: 1969–1970, Golden World (Studio B) (Detroit, Michigan)
- Genre: Soul
- Length: 2:53 (1st Version-1970) 3:06 (2nd & Hit Version-1973)
- Label: V.I.P. (1970); V-25057; Motown (1973); M-1235
- Songwriter(s): Richard Drapkin, Marty Coleman
- Producer(s): Clay McMurray

The Spinners singles chronology
"Message from a Black Man" (1970)	"Together We Can Make Such Sweet Music" (1970)	"We'll Have It Made" (1971)

"Together We Can Make Such Sweet Music" is a 1967 song co-written by Richard Drapkin and Marty Coleman. In 1968 it was assigned to Artie Fields' Top Dog label in Detroit and issued as a 45 by rhythm and blues singer Joe Towns (Top Dog 105).

When Top Dog was bought and then absorbed into the Motown stable the song was reissued with production duties from Clay McMurray as two singles for The Spinners, initially as the B-side of "It's a Shame" on Motown's V.I.P. Records.

Three years later it appeared as a reworked single for the main Motown label itself. The later release was to cash in on the success of The Spinners since signing for Atlantic Records (and leaving Motown) over a year prior. The song's narrator tells his love that there's no need for them to argue and fight due to how strong their love is when they're together. Two versions of this song were released, both of which were led by one of the group's front man Bobby Smith, with very notable changes.

The first Spinners version was more soulful, and featured the group's former front man G.C. Cameron with a lead part on the bridge; this version also appears on their second album, 2nd Time Around. The second version (released in April, 1973) was more conventional and commercial, remixed with additional adjusted instrumentation so it would sound more like the group's hits on the Atlantic label. Upon the song's re-release, "Together We Can Make Such Sweet Music", would hit #91 on the Billboard Hot 100 charts making it the group's last Motown single to chart (and their only Motown song to chart after they left the label). This second version was released on a "Best of the Spinners" LP by Motown the same year.

The song would also be covered by The Supremes twice, both as a duet with The Four Tops and (by themselves) as a track for their album New Ways but Love Stays.

== Personnel ==
- Lead vocals by Bobby Smith and G.C. Cameron (1st version only)
- Background vocals by Bobby Smith, G.C. Cameron, Pervis Jackson, Henry Fambrough and Billy Henderson
- Additional Background vocals by The Andantes: Jackie Hicks, Marlene Barrow, and Louvain Demps
- Instrumentation by The Funk Brothers

== Chart history ==
Chart (1973)	Peak position
U.S. Billboard Hot 100	91
