= How Could I Let You Get Away =

Single by The Spinners

from the album Spinners
- A-side: "How Could I Let You Get Away"
- B-side: "I'll Be Around"
- Released: July 1972
- Studio: Sigma Sound, Philadelphia, Pennsylvania
- Length: 3:47
- Label: Atlantic
- Songwriter(s): Yvette Davis
- Producer(s): Thom Bell

The Spinners singles chronology
"We'll Have It Made" (1971)	"How Could I Let You Get Away" / "I'll Be Around" (1972)	"Could It Be I'm Falling in Love" (1972)

"How Could I Let You Get Away" is a song recorded by the American vocal group The Spinners (known as "Detroit Spinners" in the UK). Produced by Thom Bell and recorded at Philly's Sigma Sound Studios, the lush, string-augmented production of the song drew comparisons to another Bell - produced group, The Stylistics. The song was recorded for inclusion on the group's 1972 self-titled debut album on Atlantic Records. It was also the A-side of the group's first single release on Atlantic in July 1972. It was the first Spinners hit to feature lead vocals by Philippé Wynne (with Henry Fambrough on close harmony, both of their vocals were multitracked). The song had modest success on the charts, reaching number fourteen on the U.S. R&B charts and crossing over to the U.S. Pop charts peaking at number seventy seven. However, it would be the single's B-side, "I'll Be Around" led by the Spinners' other lead singer Bobby Smith, that would be the group's real chart breakthrough, becoming a #1 R&B and #3 pop hit in the fall of 1972 and eventually reaching sales of over a million copies.

== Personnel ==
- Lead vocals by Philippé Wynne and Henry Fambrough
- Background vocals by Bobby Smith, Pervis Jackson, Henry Fambrough and Billy Henderson
- Instrumentation by MFSB

== Charts ==
Chart (1972)	Peak position
US Billboard Hot 100	77
US Best Selling Soul Singles (Billboard)	14
