= One of a Kind (Love Affair) =

1973 single by the Spinners

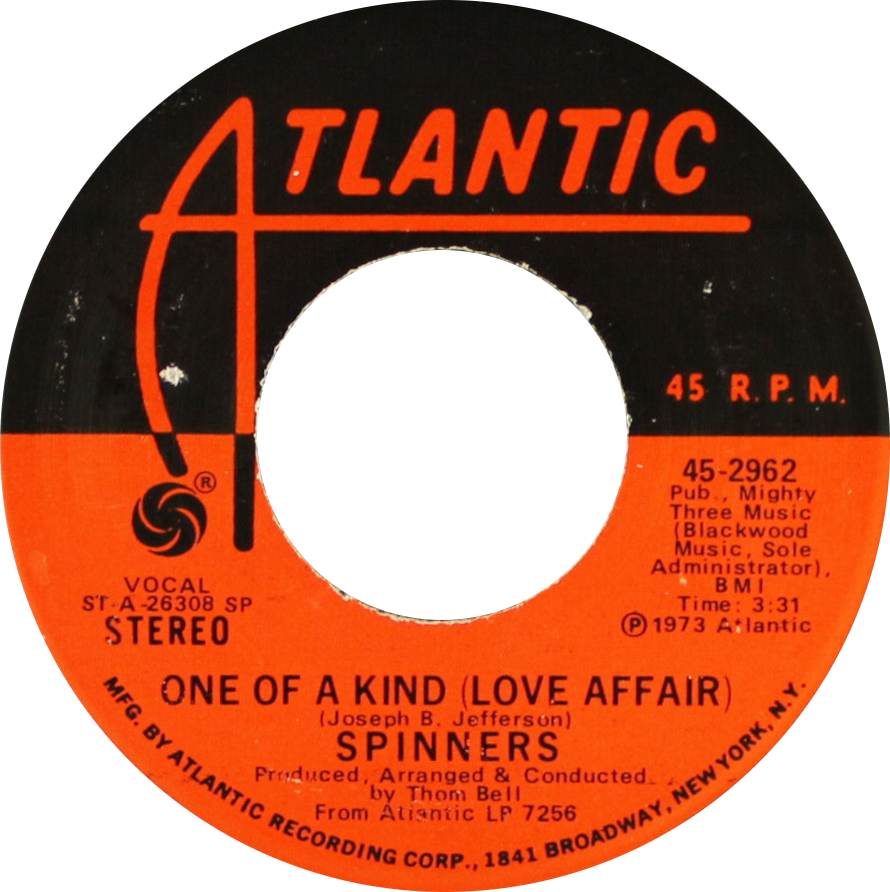
- One of side-A labels of the US single

Single by The Spinners

from the album Spinners
- B-side: "Don't Let The Green Grass Fool You"
- Released: April 13, 1973
- Genre: Philadelphia soul
- Length: 3:17 (censored version); 3:31 (uncensored version)
- Label: Atlantic
- Songwriter: Joseph B. Jefferson
- Producer: Thom Bell

The Spinners singles chronology
"Could It Be I'm Falling in Love" (1972)	"One of a Kind (Love Affair)" (1973)	"Ghetto Child" (1973)

"One of a Kind (Love Affair)" is a song recorded by the American R&B vocal group The Spinners (known as "Detroit Spinners" in the UK). It was written by Joseph B. Jefferson and produced by Thom Bell.

The Spinners recorded the song at Philly's Sigma Sound Studios, with the studio's house band MFSB providing the backing. Philippé Wynne handles lead vocals, although Bobby Smith provides these two lines in the bridge following the first verse:

I never thought about today would come
She wrote a line or two upon the wall

Released as the third single from their 1973 self-titled album on Atlantic Records, "One of a Kind (Love Affair)" was the group's third consecutive Number 1 on the U.S. R&B Singles Chart, and spent four weeks at the top spot. It also reached the Number 11 position on Billboard Pop Singles chart and was certified gold by the RIAA.

== Personnel ==
- Lead vocals by Philippé Wynne and Bobby Smith
- Background vocals by Bobby Smith, Philippé Wynne, Pervis Jackson, Henry Fambrough and Billy Henderson
- Additional background vocals by Linda Creed and The Sweethearts of Sigma (Barbara Ingram, Carla Benson, and Evette Benton)
- Instrumentation by MFSB

== Controversy ==
When the single was released, a controversy arose that a curse word could be heard in the section after the instrumental break. Supposedly, to some, the lyric Philippé Wynne sang sounded like this:

One of a kind love affair
Makes you want to love her
You just got to fuck her, yeah

However, there were others who heard the allegedly offensive line as "You just got to hug her, yeah". Regardless, Atlantic quickly responded to the complaints by reissuing the song with the three lines edited out and the "One of a kind love affair makes a lame man walk, makes a blind man talk about seeing again" lyric was moved up to right after the instrumental break. To add to the confusion, some lyrics web sites have the line as "You just have to hurt her, yeah". Over the years both the "censored" and the "uncensored" versions of the song have been used for the numerous CD appearances that "One of a Kind (Love Affair)" has made.

== Chart performance ==
=== Weekly charts ===
Chart (1973)	Peak position
Canada	16
US Billboard Hot 100	11
US Billboard Best Selling Soul Singles	1
US Billboard Easy Listening	19
US Cash Box Top 100	8

=== Year-end charts ===
Chart (1973)	Rank
Canada	125
U.S. Billboard Hot 100	82
U.S. Cash Box Top 100	84
