= I'll Always Love You (The Spinners song) =

Single by The Spinners

from the album The Original Spinners
- B-side: "Tomorrow May Never Come"
- Released: June 4, 1965
- Recorded: 1965
- Studio: Hitsville USA (Studio A) (Detroit, Michigan)
- Genre: Soul, R&B, Pop
- Length: 2:42
- Label: Motown Records; M 1078
- Songwriters: William "Mickey" Stevenson; Ivy Jo Hunter
- Producers: William "Mickey" Stevenson; Ivy Jo Hunter

The Spinners singles chronology
"Sweet Thing" (1964)	"I'll Always Love You" (1965)	"Truly Yours" (1966)

"I'll Always Love You" is a song co-written by William "Mickey" Stevenson and Ivy Jo Hunter and produced by Stevenson and Hunter as a single for The Spinners on the Motown Records label. The single became the Detroit-reared group's first charting single on the Motown Records company since they had signed with the company in 1964 (and their third charting hit over all). The song was a top 40 pop single on the Billboard Hot 100 in the United States, on which it peaked at number 35. On the Billboard R&B singles chart, "I'll Always Love You" peaked at number 8. The song featured lead vocals by the group's main lead singer, Bobby Smith.

== Credits ==
- Lead vocals by Bobby Smith
- Background vocals by Bobby Smith, Chico Edwards, Pervis Jackson, Henry Fambrough and Billy Henderson
- Additional background vocals by The Andantes
- Instrumentation by the Funk Brothers

== Charts ==
Chart (1965)	Peak position
US Billboard Hot 100	35
US Hot Rhythm & Blues Singles (Billboard)	8
