= Spinners (album) =

Studio album by The Spinners
- Released: March 1973
- Recorded: 1972–1973
- Studio: Sigma Sound, Philadelphia, Pennsylvania
- Genre: Philly soul; R&B
- Length: 40:14
- Label: Atlantic
- Producer: Thom Bell

The Spinners chronology
2nd Time Around (1970)	Spinners (1973)	The Best of the Spinners (1973)

The Spinners studio albums chronology
2nd Time Around (1970)	Spinners (1973)	Mighty Love (1974)

Professional ratings
Review scores
Source	Rating
AllMusic	4.5/5 stars
BBC	(favorable)
Christgau's Record Guide	A−
Tom Hull – on the Web	A−

Spinners is the third studio album recorded by American R&B group The Spinners, produced by Thom Bell and released in March 1973 on the Atlantic label. The album was the group's first for Atlantic after leaving Motown.

== History ==
Spinners includes their first American top-ten and R&B number-one hit "I'll Be Around", along with the successful songs "Could It Be I'm Falling in Love", "One of a Kind (Love Affair)", "Ghetto Child", and "How Could I Let You Get Away". The album was also the second of fourteen straight studio albums to make the Billboard 200, and their first in the Top-twenty, as it reached #14 on the charts. Additionally, it was their first of three consecutive R&B albums chart-toppers – and the second to hit those charts overall.

== Reception ==
BBC Radio's Trevor Nelson said producer Thom Bell created a sound for the group that was "lush yet gritty. Bell's insistently soulful orchestral arrangements played perfectly to their harmonic strengths. "Could It Be I'm Falling In Love" (later a hit for David Grant and Jaki Graham) is the keynote; sung by Smith, it is beautiful, optimistic and upbeat. Often cited as the birth of the Philadelphia Sound, Spinners yielded five American top 100 hits, and two UK chart successes."

== Track listing ==
Side one
No.	Title	Writer(s)	Length
1.	"Just Can't Get You Out of My Mind"	Vinnie Barrett	3:42
2.	"Just You and Me Baby"	Yvette Davis	2:56
3.	"Don't Let the Green Grass Fool You"	Jerry Akines, Johnny Bellman, Victor Drayton, Reginald Turner	4:01
4.	"I Could Never (Repay Your Love)"	Bruce Hawes	6:56
5.	"I'll Be Around"	Thom Bell, Phil Hurtt	3:12

Side two
No.	Title	Writer(s)	Length
6.	"One of a Kind (Love Affair)"	Joseph B. Jefferson	3:31
7.	"We Belong Together"	Yvette Davis	4:12
8.	"Ghetto Child"	Linda Creed, Thom Bell	3:47
9.	"How Could I Let You Get Away"	Yvette Davis	3:46
10.	"Could It Be I'm Falling in Love"	Mystro & Lyric (Melvin and Mervin Steals)	4:13

== Personnel ==
- Billy Henderson, Bobby Smith, Philippé Wynne, Henry Fambrough, Pervis Jackson – vocals
- Roland Chambers, Norman Harris, Bobby Eli – guitars
- Thom Bell – pianos
- Ronnie Baker – bass guitar
- Don Renaldo – strings
- Earl Young – drums
- Larry Washington – congas, bongos
- Vincent Montana Jr. – vibes, marimbas
- MFSB – orchestration
  - Jack Faith – alto saxophone, flute
  - Rocco Bene, Bobby Hartzell – trumpet
  - Joe DeAnglis, Robert Martin – French horn
  - Freddie Joiner, Bobby Moore, Richie Genevese, Eddie Keskarella – trombone
- Linda Creed, Barbara Ingram, Carla Benson, Yvette Benton – backing vocals

== Production ==
- Thom Bell – producer, arranger, conductor
- Joe Tarsia – recording engineer, re-mix engineer
- Merrill A. Roberts, Jr. – photography
- Loring Eutemey – album design

== Charts ==
Chart (1973)	Peak
U.S. Billboard Top LPs	14
U.S. Billboard Top Soul LPs	1

Singles

Year	Single	Peak chart positions			
Year	Single	US	US R&B	US A/C	UK
1972	"How Could I Let You Get Away"	77	14	—	—
1972	"I'll Be Around"	3	1	31	—
1972	"Could It Be I'm Falling in Love"	4	1	14	11
1973	"One of a Kind (Love Affair)"	11	1	19	—
1973	"Ghetto Child"	29	4	20	7

== See also ==
- List of number-one R&B albums of 1973 (U.S.)
