= Working My Way Back to You =

1966 single by the Four Seasons

- Side A of the US single

Single by the Four Seasons

from the album Working My Way Back to You and More Great New Hits
- B-side: "Too Many Memories"
- Released: January 1966
- Genre: Pop-soul; blue-eyed soul
- Length: 3:02
- Label: Philips
- Songwriters: Denny Randell, Sandy Linzer
- Producer: Bob Crewe

The Four Seasons singles chronology
"Little Boy (in Grown-Up Clothes)" (1965)	"Working My Way Back to You" (1966)	"Opus 17 (Don't You Worry 'Bout Me)" (1966)

"Working My Way Back to You" is a song made popular by the Four Seasons in 1966 and the Spinners in 1979.

Written by Sandy Linzer and Denny Randell, the song was originally recorded by The Four Seasons in 1966, reaching No. 9 on the U.S. Billboard Hot 100. On the UK top 50 chart it spent three weeks – all at No. 50. It is the only hit to feature the group's arranger Charles Calello in the temporary role of bassist/bass vocalist, having replaced original member Nick Massi.

The lyrics tell about a man who cheated on his girlfriend. When she leaves, he realizes that he did love her and is very remorseful about his past actions. He vows to win her love back. It is in some ways a re-casting of the melody from their previous hit, "Let's Hang On!".

Cash Box described it as a "raunchy, blues-drenched ode about a love-sick fella who hopes to be re-united with his ex-gal," and said that it has "money-in-the-bank-sound."

== Charts ==
Chart (1966)	Peak position
Canada RPM Top Singles	26
U.S. Billboard Hot 100	9
U.S. Cash Box Top 100	10
UK	50

== The Spinners version ==
"Working My Way Back to You/Forgive Me, Girl"
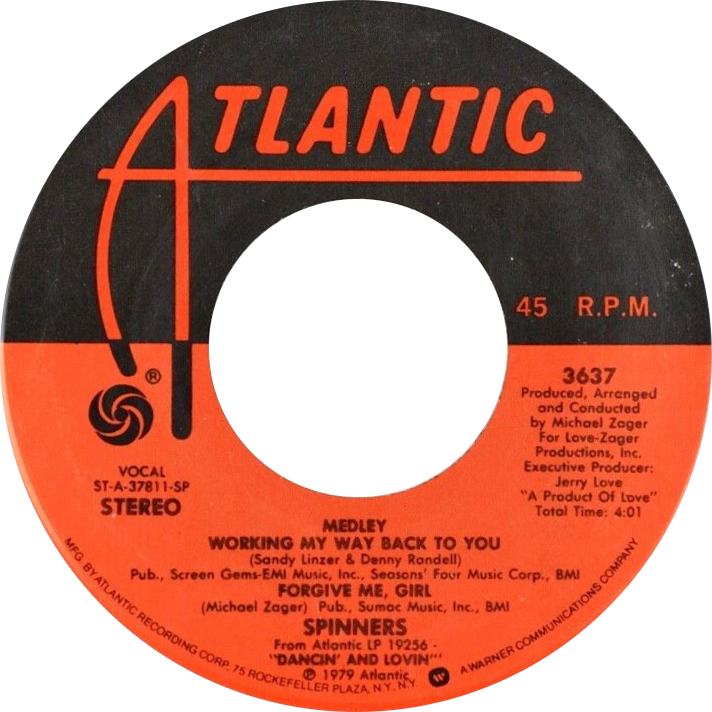
- One of side-A labels of the US single

Single by the Spinners

from the album Dancin' and Lovin'
- B-side: "Disco Ride"
- Released: December 1979 (U.S.)
- Recorded: 1979
- Studio: Blue Rock, New York City
- Genre: R&B, soul, disco
- Length: 4:02 (single); 6:03 (album version)
- Label: Atlantic
- Songwriters: Denny Randell, Sandy Linzer, Michael Zager
- Producer: Michael Zager

The Spinners singles chronology
"Body Language" (1979)	"Working My Way Back to You/Forgive Me, Girl" (1979)	"Cupid" / "I've Loved You for a Long Time" (1980)

In 1979, American soul and R&B group the Spinners recorded "Working My Way Back to You" and added a new bridge composed by Michael Zager. Billed as a medley as "Working My Way Back to You/Forgive Me, Girl", this version was No. 1 in the UK Singles Chart for two weeks in April 1980. On the Billboard Hot 100 singles chart, the medley (released in December 1979 in the U.S.) peaked at the No. 2 position in March and April 1980 for two weeks, behind "Another Brick in the Wall" by Pink Floyd. The Spinners' version also made it to No. 6 on the Soul Singles chart and No. 8 on the disco/dance chart. The version of the Spinners was taken up in French by the Canadian singer Jean Nichol under the title "Je voudrais te retrouver" (I want to find you).

The Spinners version of "Working My Way Back to You" was used in a series of television advertisements for BT in the United Kingdom circa 1998 to 2001 where reversed video is used to signify people "coming back to BT".

=== Chart performance ===
==== Weekly charts ====
Chart (1979–1980)	Peak position
Australia (Kent Music Report	12
Canada Top Singles (RPM)	5
Canada RPM Adult Contemporary	7
UK Singles Chart	1
Irish Singles Chart	1
German Singles Chart	12
Netherlands	2
New Zealand Singles Chart	3
Swiss Singles Chart	8
US Cash Box Top 100	3
US Billboard Hot 100	2
US Hot R&B/Hip-Hop Songs (Billboard)	6
US Dance Club Songs (Billboard)	8
US Adult Contemporary (Billboard)	5

==== Year-end charts ====
Chart (1980)	Rank
Australia (Kent Music Report	50
Canada	44
New Zealand	37
UK	8
US Cash Box Top 100	20
US Billboard Hot 100	14

== Boyzone version ==
"Working My Way Back to You"

Single by Boyzone
- Released: May 1994
- Recorded: 1994
- Genre: Pop
- Length: 3:41
- Label: PolyGram
- Songwriters: Sandy Linzer, Denny Randell
- Producer: Ian Levine

Boyzone singles chronology
"Working My Way Back to You" (1994)	"Love Me for a Reason" (1994)

Music video
- "Working My Way Back To You" on YouTube

Irish boy band Boyzone released a cover version of "Working My Way Back to You" as their debut single in May 1994. The song reached No. 3 on the Irish Singles Chart. It is the only single of the group to feature Mikey Graham on lead vocals.

The band later recorded a French version in collaboration with Alliage. This French version of the track is credited as being a major turning point in the career of producer-songwriter Steve Mac. A lack of interest from the "usual producers" led to Polydor phoning up Mac and asking him to take on the role, and by doing so he effectively made a decisive progression from his early dance-pop singles to the mature balladry with which he has since made a very successful career.

=== Track listings ===
- "Working My Way Back to You"
1. "Working My Way Back to You" – 4:12
2. "Working My Way Back to You" (POD 12" mix) – 8:13
3. "Father and Son" – 2:49
- "Te Garder Pres De Moi"
1. "Te Garder Près De Moi" (with Alliage) – 4:41
2. "Te Garder Près De Moi" (instrumental) – 4:41

=== Charts ===
- "Working My Way Back to You"

Chart (1994)	Peak position
Ireland (IRMA)	3

- "Te Garder Près De Moi" (with Alliage)

Chart (1997–1998)	Peak position
Belgium (Ultratip Bubbling Under Flanders)	5
Belgium (Ultratop 50 Wallonia)	3
Europe (Eurochart Hot 100)	15
France (SNEP)	3
France Airplay (SNEP)	13
UK Singles (OCC)	90

== Personnel ==
=== The Four Seasons' version ===
- Lead vocals by Frankie Valli
- Background vocals by Tommy DeVito, Charles Calello and Bob Gaudio
- Instrumentation by Charles Calello (bass), Bob Gaudio (keyboards), Tommy DeVito (guitar)

=== The (Detroit) Spinners' version ===
- Lead vocals by John Edwards and Pervis Jackson
- Background vocals by Bobby Smith, Pervis Jackson, Henry Fambrough and Billy Henderson
- Instrumentation by various Philadelphia area musicians

=== Boyzone version ===
- Lead vocals by Stephen Gately and Mikey Graham
- Background vocals by Keith Duffy, Mikey Graham, Shane Lynch and Ronan Keating
