= That's What Girls Are Made For =

Single by The Spinners

from the album The Spinners: Their Early Years & The Original Spinners
- B-side: "Heebie Jeebies"
- Released: August 1961
- Recorded: May, 1961, Tri-Phi Studios, Detroit, Michigan
- Genre: Doo-wop, R&B
- Length: 2:52
- Label: Tri-Phi Records; TP 1001
- Songwriter(s): Harvey Fuqua; Gwen Gordy Fuqua
- Producer(s): Harvey Fuqua

The Spinners singles chronology
"That's What Girls Are Made For" (1961)	"Love (I'm So Glad I Found You)" (1961)

"That's What Girls Are Made For" is the debuting single for the American R&B/Soul vocal group The Spinners, released on Harvey Fuqua's Tri-Phi Records label in 1961.

The single featured most of the original members of the group including original lead singer Bobby Smith and featured a very young Marvin Gaye playing drums. Harvey Fuqua and his then-girlfriend Gwen Gordy made the song simply for them to record.

Released nationally on Tri-Phi, the song reached number 27 on the Billboard Hot 100 and number 5 on the Hot R&B Songs chart, starting a long successful run for the group, who later found success with neighboring Detroit label Motown Records in the mid-1960s and Philadelphia soul-based records with Atlantic Records in the 1970s.

== Credits ==
- Lead vocals by Bobby Smith
- Background vocals by Bobby Smith, George Dixon, Pervis Jackson, Henry Fambrough and Billy Henderson
- Drums by Marvin Gaye
- Other Instrumentation by Various session artists (including possibly The Funk Brothers)

== Chart history ==
Chart (1961)	Peak position
U.S. Billboard Hot 100 Chart	27
U.S. Billboard Hot R&B Singles	5
