= I'll Be Around (The Spinners song) =

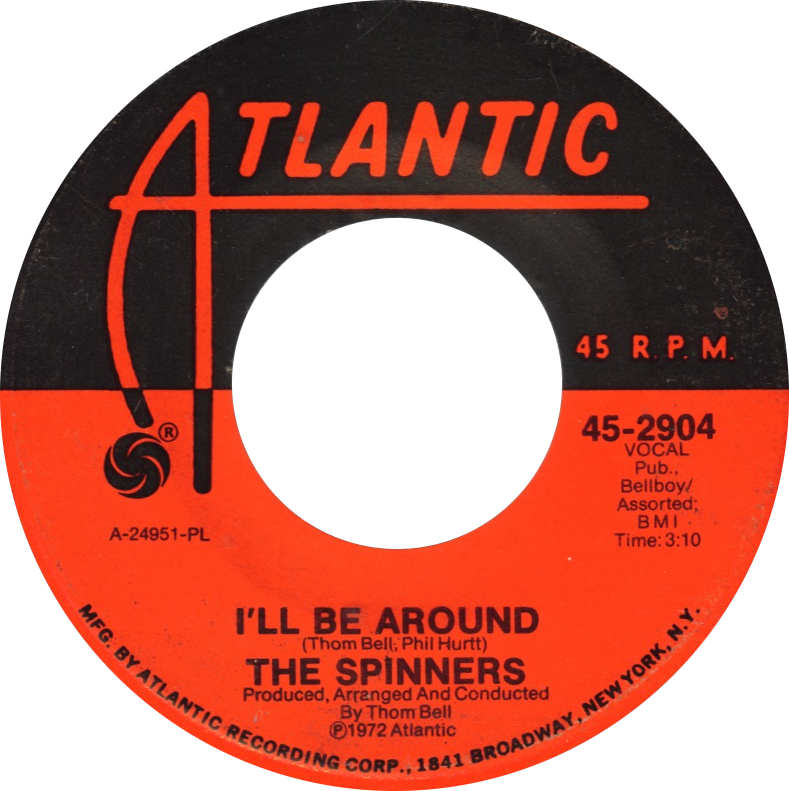
- Side B of the US single

Single by The Spinners

from the album Spinners
- A-side: "How Could I Let You Get Away"
- Released: July 1972
- Studio: Sigma Sound, Philadelphia, Pennsylvania
- Genre: Philadelphia soul
- Length: 3:12
- Label: Atlantic
- Songwriters: Thom Bell; Phil Hurtt
- Producer: Thom Bell

The Spinners singles chronology
"We'll Have It Made" (1971)	"How Could I Let You Get Away" / "I'll Be Around" (1972)	"Could It Be I'm Falling in Love" (1972)

Vinyl video
- "I'll Be Around" by The Spinners on YouTube

"I'll Be Around" is a song recorded by the American R&B vocal group The Spinners (known as "Detroit Spinners" in the UK). It was co-written by Thom Bell and Phil Hurtt and produced by Bell.

Recorded at Philadelphia's Sigma Sound Studios, the house band MFSB provided the backing. The production of the song gives it a smooth, mid-tempo feel, with the signature guitar riff (in octaves) played by Norman Harris at the forefront and punctuation from female background singers, the MFSB horns & strings and conga-playing from Larry Washington. Bobby Smith handles lead vocals on the song.

The song was included on the group's 1973 self-titled album on Atlantic Records, their first album release for the label. It was initially released as the B-side of the group's first single on Atlantic Records, with "How Could I Let You Get Away" being the A-side. Radio deejays, however, soon opted for "I'll Be Around" which led to Atlantic flipping the single over and the song became an unexpected hit, eventually spending five weeks at No.1 on the U.S. R&B chart (the group's first No.1 on the R&B chart), and reaching No.3 on the U.S. Pop chart in the fall of 1972. It also reached sales of over one million copies, The Spinners' first record ever to do so. The success of "I'll Be Around" would be the first in a series of chart successes The Spinners and Bell would have together during the 1970s.

== Personnel ==
- Lead vocals by Bobby Smith
- Background vocals by Bobby Smith, Philippé Wynne, Pervis Jackson, Henry Fambrough and Billy Henderson
- Additional Background vocals by Linda Creed and the Sigma Sweethearts (Barbara Ingram, Carla Benson, and Evette Benton)
- Instrumentation by MFSB
  - The signature bassline which underpins the song is played by Ronnie Baker

== Cover versions ==
In 1985, the American new wave group What Is This released a cover of "I'll Be Around", produced by Todd Rundgren, that reached No. 62 on the Billboard Hot 100.

In 2015, the German group, Hotlane (Agnes Lindström & Jack Tennis) sampled "I'll Be Around" on the song "Whenever", featured on their first album titled "The EP".

== Charts ==
=== Weekly charts ===
The Spinners version

Chart (1972)	Peak position
Canada Top Singles (RPM)	6
US Billboard Hot 100	3
US Hot Soul Singles (Billboard)	1
US Cash Box Top 100	1

Hall & Oates version

Chart (2004–05)	Peak position
US Billboard Hot 100	97
US Adult Contemporary (Billboard)	6

=== Year-end charts ===
Chart (1972)	Rank
Canada	61

== See also ==
- List of Best Selling Soul Singles number ones of 1972
