= At Their Best =

At Their Best may refer to:

- At Their Best, a 1998 compilation album of The Dubliners
- At Their Best, a compilation album by Pentangle, 1983
- At Their Best (Spinners album), 1999
- At Their Best (The Supremes album), 1978
