= Could It Be I'm Falling in Love =

1972 single by R&B group The Spinners

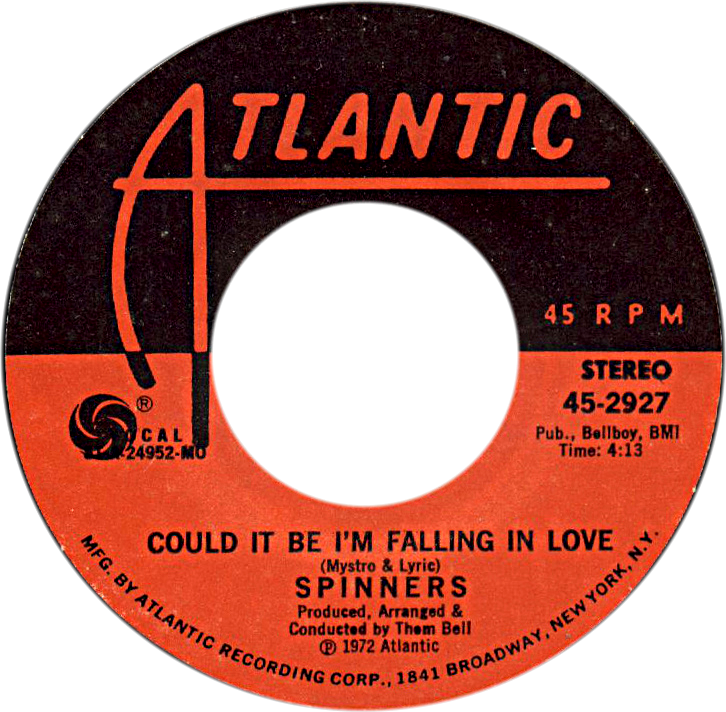
- One of A-side labels of U.S. vinyl release

Single by The Spinners

from the album Spinners
- B-side: "Just You and Me Baby"
- Released: November 1972
- Studio: Sigma Sound, New York City
- Genre: Philadelphia soul; R&B; smooth soul
- Length: 4:13
- Label: Atlantic
- Songwriters: Mystro & Lyric
- Producer: Thom Bell

The Spinners singles chronology
| "How Could I Let You Get Away" (1972) | "Could It Be I'm Falling in Love" (1972) | "One of a Kind (Love Affair)" (1973) |

Vinyl video
- "Could It Be I'm Falling in Love" by The Spinners on YouTube

"Could It Be I'm Falling in Love" is a 1972 song recorded by the American R&B vocal group The Spinners (known as "Detroit Spinners" in the UK). It was co-written by Melvin and Mervin Steals, two songwriter brothers working for Atlantic, who were sometimes credited as "Mystro and Lyric." It was produced by Thom Bell, recorded at Philadelphia's Sigma Sound Studios and the house band MFSB provided the backing. Bobby Smith sings lead through most of the song, while Philippé Wynne handles vocal duties on the outro.

Released as the follow-up single to the group's first hit for Atlantic Records, "I'll Be Around," "Could It Be I'm Falling in Love" would equal the success of its predecessor, peaking at #1 on the R&B chart, #4 on the Billboard Hot 100 the weeks of March 3 and 10, 1973 and selling over one million copies. The song also found success in the UK, peaking at #11 on the UK Singles Chart.

== Reception ==
Record World called it a "beautiful smash r&b ballad which spins a guaranteed success" with "outstanding production by Thom Bell." Pitchfork named it the 184th best song of the 1970s, saying "every time lead vocalist Smith is offered the opportunity to go loud, he goes soft, letting Bell's dulcet accompaniments do the singing for him. The '70s yielded countless songs about falling in love, but few are as blissful as this."

== The Spinners version credits ==
- Lead vocals by Bobby Smith and Philippé Wynne
- Background vocals by Smith, Wynne, Pervis Jackson, Henry Fambrough and Billy Henderson
- Additional background vocals by Linda Creed and The Sweethearts of Sigma (Barbara Ingram, Carla Benson, and Evette Benton)
- Instrumentation by MFSB

== Charts ==
=== Weekly charts ===
| Chart (1972–1973) | Peak position |
|---|---|
| Canada RPM Top Singles | 12 |
| Canada RPM Adult Contemporary | 68 |
| UK Singles Chart | 11 |
| US Billboard Hot 100 | 4 |
| US Billboard Best Selling Soul Singles | 1 |
| US Billboard Easy Listening | 14 |
| US Cash Box Top 100 | 1 |

=== Year-end charts ===
| Chart (1973) | Position |
|---|---|
| US Billboard Hot 100 | 47 |
| US Cash Box Top 100 | 46 |
| Canada | 98 |

== Cover versions ==
The song has been covered many times over the years, including a duet by David Grant and Jaki Graham (which peaked at #5 on the UK Singles Chart in 1985) and versions by Regina Belle and Donny Osmond.
