= Then Came You (album) =

Studio album by Dionne Warwick
- Released: February 1975
- Studios: Hit Factory, New York City
- Length: 38:24
- Label: Warner Bros.
- Producers: Thom Bell; Jerry Ragovoy

Dionne Warwick chronology
Just Being Myself (1973)	Then Came You (1975)	Track of the Cat (1975)

Singles from Then Came You
- 1. "Then Came You" Released: July 13, 1974; 2. "Sure Thing" Released: 1974; 3. "Take It From Me" Released: 1975

Then Came You is a studio album by the American singer Dionne Warwick. Sharing its title with the number one hit song Warwick performed a year before with the Spinners, the album was released by Warner Bros. Records in 1975 in the United States. The album peaked at number 167 on the US Billboard Top LPs chart.

== Critical reception ==
Professional ratings
Review scores
Source	Rating
AllMusic	4/5 stars
The Rolling Stone Album Guide	3.5/5 stars

AllMusic editor Jason Elias found that Then Came You "is mostly an innovative effort of New York R&B/pop that should make anyone's short list of albums that truly capture the style [...] Here [Warwick] wasn't so much an interpreter of 'great material,' her voice and charm were the primary draw."

== Track listing ==
Side one
No.	Title	Writer(s)	Producer(s)	Length
1.	"Take It from Me"	Jerry Ragovoy	Ragovoy	3:41
2.	"We'll Burn Our Bridges Behind Us"	Ragovoy; Linda Laurie	Ragovoy	3:30
3.	"Sure Thing"	Ragovoy; Aaron Schroeder; George David Weiss	Ragovoy	3:09
4.	"Then Came You" (with The Spinners)	Sherman Marshall; Phillip T. Pugh	Thom Bell	3:53
5.	"How Can I Tell Him"	Ragovoy; Jacob Brackman	Ragovoy	5:21

Side two
No.	Title	Writer(s)	Producer(s)	Length
6.	"Move Me No Mountain"	Ragovoy; Abbey Schroeder	Ragovoy	4:52
7.	"I Can't Wait Until I See My Baby's Face"	Ragovoy; Chip Taylor	Ragovoy	3:27
8.	"It's Magic"	Ragovoy; Brackman	Ragovoy	3:16
9.	"Who Knows"	Ragovoy; Laurie	Ragovoy	3:15
10.	"Getting in My Way"	Ragovoy; Brackman	Ragovoy	3:15

== Personnel and credits ==
Credits adapted from the liner notes of Then Came You.

Musicians

- Dionne Warwick – vocals
- The Spinners – vocals (track 4)
- Thom Bell – arrangement and conducting (track 4)
- Jerry Ragovoy – arrangements (tracks 1–3, 5–10)
- Bob Babbitt (as Robert Babbit Kreinar) – bass guitar (tracks 1–3, 5–10)
- Jerry Friedman – guitar (tracks 1–3, 5–10)
- John Tropea – guitar (tracks 3, 8–10)
- Jeff Mironov – guitar (tracks 1, 2, 5–7)
- Andrew Smith – drums (tracks 1–3, 6–10)
- Ray Lucas – drums (track 5)
- Arthur Jenkins – congas (track 5)
- Leon Pendarvis – piano (tracks 1–3, 6–10)
- George Devens – vibraphone (tracks 3, 8–10)
- Jack Jennings – vibraphone (track 5)
- Larry Wilcox – string and horn arrangements (tracks 2, 7)

Technical

- Bruce Tergesen, Harry Maslin, Jim McCurdy – engineer
- Albert Watson – photography

== Charts ==
Chart performance for Then Came You
Chart (1975)	Peak position
US Top LP's & Tape (Billboard)	167
US Soul LP's (Billboard)	35
US Top 101 to 175 Albums (Cash Box)	159
US The R&B LP Chart (Record World)	36
