= For All We Know (1934 song) =

1934 song by J. Fred Coots (music) and Sam M. Lewis (words)

Song
- Published: 1934 by Leo Feist, Inc.
- Composer: J. Fred Coots
- Lyricist: Sam M. Lewis

"For All We Know" is a jazz standard published in 1934, with music by J. Fred Coots and lyrics by Sam M. Lewis. Popular versions in 1934 were by Hal Kemp (vocal by Skinnay Ennis) and Isham Jones (vocal by Joe Martin).

== Background ==
There are alternative verses but the main lyrics start: "For all we know we may never meet again...".

== Other artists' recordings ==
- 1958 Billie Holiday 1958 Lady in Satin album by Columbia Records
- The version by Dinah Washington reached No. 88 on the chart in 1962.
- A version by The Spinners in 1965 gave it a more contemporary sound and was included on the 1967 LP The Original Spinners.
- The Donny Hathaway version from the LP Roberta Flack & Donny Hathaway (Atlantic, 1972).
- Esther Phillips's version was released as a single and reached No. 98 on the Billboard Hot Soul Singles chart, in early 1976.
- A version by jazz pianist Bill Evans was recorded for his last studio album We Will Meet Again (Warner Bros. Records, 1979).
- Jane Ira Bloom included the song in her 2013 album Sixteen Sunsets.
- Jennifer Hudson sang a rendition of the song at the All Star Game tribute to Gianna and Kobe Bryant in 2020.
- The song has also been recorded by a host of artists, including: Nina Simone, Al Martino, The Andrews Sisters, M. Ward, Aretha Franklin, Billie Holiday, Chet Baker, Crystal Gayle, Dinah Washington, Doris Day, Joanie Sommers, Fran Jeffries, Bette Midler, Nat King Cole, Rod Stewart, June Christy, Ruben Studdard, Frankie Valli, Caleb Kelly, Will Downing, Rosemary Clooney, Long John Baldry, Ken Dodd and Clint Eastwood.

== Song in popular culture ==
- Graham Kennedy sang a few bars live as his curtain call outro song to end each last season episode of The Graham Kennedy Show (1972-75).
- The Rosemary Clooney version is heard over the closing credits of Dan Ireland's 2005 British film Mrs. Palfrey at the Claremont. Rupert Friend performs the song in the movie.
- The Bette Midler version was featured in the 1991 film For the Boys.
- A cover by Abbey Lincoln was featured prominently in the Gus Van Sant film Drugstore Cowboy (1989).
- An instrumental version, and a Barbra Streisand vocal version, are featured in the 1991 film The Prince of Tides.
- The Billie Holiday version is featured in the 1995 film Forget Paris.
- Johnny Hartman's version was featured in the Clint Eastwood movie The Bridges of Madison County (1995).
- Donny Hathaway's version was featured in the 2005 film Roll Bounce.
- A cover by Billy Porter and Our Lady J was featured in a 2018 episode of Pose.
