= Then Came You (Dionne Warwick and the Spinners song) =

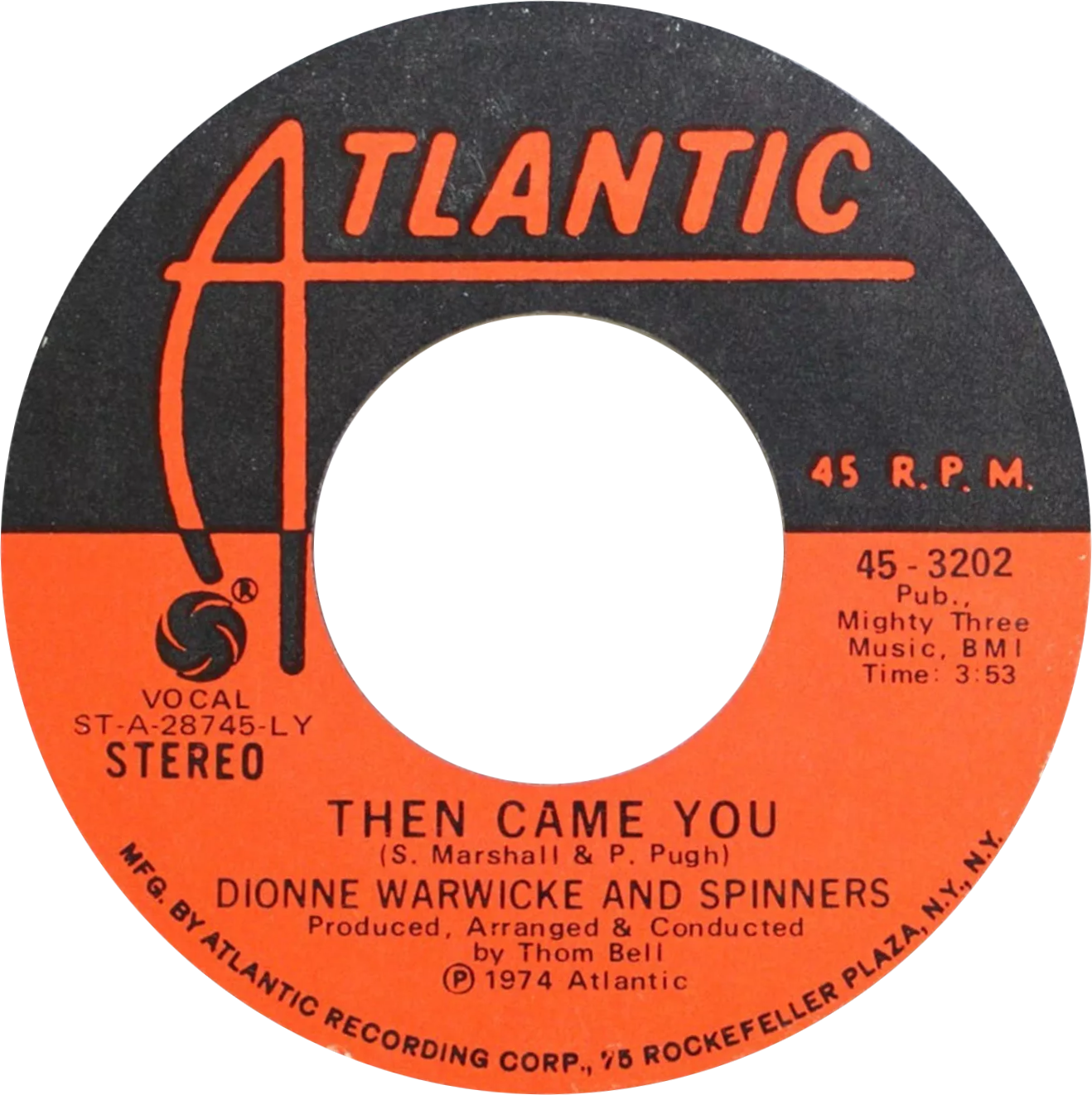
- One of side-A labels of the US single

Single by Dionne Warwick & the Spinners

from the album Then Came You (Dionne Warwick) & New and Improved (Spinners)
- B-side: "Just as Long as We Have Love"
- Released: July 13, 1974
- Recorded: April 2, 1974
- Studio: Sigma Sound Studios and Beach Boys Studio
- Genre: Philadelphia soul; proto-disco
- Length: 3:53
- Label: Atlantic
- Songwriters: Sherman Marshall; Phillip Pugh
- Producer: Thom Bell

Dionne Warwick singles chronology
"I'm Just Being Myself" (1973)	"Then Came You" (1974)	"Take It From Me" (1975)

Official audio
- "Then Came You (Remastered)" on YouTube

The Spinners singles chronology
"I'm Coming Home" (1974)	"Then Came You" (1974)	"Love Don't Love Nobody (Part 1)"

"Then Came You" is a 1974 song recorded by American soul singer Dionne Warwick and American R&B group The Spinners. It was credited to Dionne Warwicke and the Spinners (from 1971 to 1975, Warwick added a final 'e' to her last name). The track was written by Sherman Marshall and Phillip T. Pugh, and produced by Thom Bell.

Released during a time that Warwick's chart fortunes were at an ebb after moving to Warner Bros. Records in 1972, this Philadelphia soul single was a rare mid-1970s success for the singer. Sung as a duet with Bobby Smith, main lead singer of the Spinners, who were one of the most popular groups of the decade, the song became Warwick's first ever single to reach number one on the US Billboard Hot 100 and also became her highest-charting R&B record of the 1970s, reaching number two on that chart, behind Barry White's "Can't Get Enough of Your Love, Babe" (itself a Hot 100 number-one single). It was also the first number-one pop hit for the Spinners. It became an RIAA gold record, and was nominated for a Grammy.

== Background ==
In 1972, The Spinners left Motown and joined Atlantic Records. They were paired with producer Thom Bell. They released three number one R&B singles and in March 1973 released the eponymous album Spinners, which reached number one on the R&B albums chart. The Spinners toured with Warwick in the summer of 1973, and Bell was asked to produce an album with Warwick. Bell and his writing team at Atlantic Records wrote "Then Came You" as a duet for Warwick and the Spinners. The song's rhythm track was recorded at Sigma Studios in Philadelphia. Then the lead vocals were recorded at the Beach Boys Studio in Los Angeles. Additional vocals, strings and horns were then added in Philadelphia. (Note: For this song AllMusic credits the bass performance to bassist James Jamerson, however several sources credit the bass performance to bassist Bob Babbitt. The song's instrumental tracks were recorded in Philadelphia, and at the time of this recording (1973–1974) Jamerson was based in Los Angeles.) At the time, Bell was also producing The Spinners' next album titled New and Improved (released in December 1974). The song "Then Came You" appears on both The Spinners album New and Improved as well as Warwick's subsequent album Then Came You (released February 1975).

Spinners member Philippé Wynne takes over the lead vocals at the very end of the song, as he did on another one of the group's big hits, "Could It Be I'm Falling in Love".

While Warwick was signed to Warner Bros. at the time, this release actually came out on Atlantic Records, which was the Spinners' label, but also a sister label to Warner Bros. Warwick eventually left Warner Bros. for Arista Records in 1978 where she regrouped and found consistent success again as an artist.

== Track listing and formats ==
- US 7" Vinyl single

A. "Then Came You" – 3:53
B. "Just as Long as We Have Love" – 4:00

== Personnel ==
- Producer, arranger, conductor – Thom Bell
- Writer – Bruce Hawes, Vinnie Barrett (Track B)

== Charts ==
=== Weekly charts ===
Chart (1974)	Peak position
Australia KMR	59
Canada RPM Top Singles	7
Canada RPM Adult Contemporary	6
UK Singles (OCC)	29
US Billboard Hot 100	1
US Billboard Adult Contemporary	3
US Billboard Hot Soul Singles	2
US Cashbox Top 100	1

=== Year-end charts ===
Chart (1974)	Rank
Canada	40
US Billboard Hot 100	47
US Cash Box Top 100	41
