= Smooth soul =

Music genre

- Stylistic origins: Soul; funk; pop
- Cultural origins: Early 1970s, United States
- Typical instruments: Electric guitar; guitar; bass; piano; organ; drums; horn section; vocals
- Derivative forms: Quiet storm; contemporary R&B

Regional scenes
- Philadelphia soul; Motown sound

Smooth soul is a fusion genre of soul music that developed in the early 1970s from soul, funk, and pop music in the United States. The fusion genre experienced mainstream success from the time of its development to the late 1970s, before its succession by disco and quiet storm.

== Style ==
Smooth soul is characterized by melodic hooks, funk influence and smooth production style. Allmusic describes smooth soul as "smooth, stylish, and romantic." Unlike pop-soul, which predominantly featured dance-oriented music at the time, smooth soul was more ballad-oriented with generally romantic and seductive lyrical themes. However, its melodic hooks were ideal for crossover play, much like the former. The funk influence of smooth soul's beats also gave the subgenre its distinction from pop.

== Popularity ==
The music enjoyed commercial success during the early to mid-1970s through the works of such artists as Al Green, The Spinners, Marvin Gaye, Harold Melvin & the Blue Notes, Bill Withers, Minnie Riperton, Smokey Robinson, Earth, Wind & Fire and The Stylistics. Well-known works of the smooth soul genre include Let's Get It On (1973), Spinners (1972), Just as I Am (1971) and Let's Stay Together (1972). As pop-soul had metamorphosed into disco during the late 1970s, smooth soul was eventually followed by the development of the quiet storm format.

== Notable artists ==
- Ashford & Simpson
- Smokey Robinson
- The Chi-Lites
- Tyrone Davis
- The Delfonics
- The Dells
- Lamont Dozier
- The Dramatics
- Earth, Wind & Fire
- The Emotions
- Roberta Flack
- The Manhattans
- Marvin Gaye
- Al Green
- The Main Ingredient
- Harold Melvin & the Blue Notes
- New York City
- The O'Jays
- Teddy Pendergrass
- The Persuaders
- Minnie Riperton
- The Spinners
- The Stylistics
- The Whispers
- Barry White
- Bill Withers
- Stevie Wonder
- The Isley Brothers
- The Commodores
- Silk Sonic

== See also ==
- Smooth jazz
- Jazz rock
- Disco music
