= Living a Little, Laughing a Little =

1975 single by The Spinners

Single by The Spinners

from the album New and Improved
- B-side: "Smile, We Have Each Other"
- Released: February 1975
- Studio: Sigma Sound, Philadelphia, Pennsylvania
- Genre: R&B
- Length: 5:03 (album version); 3:16 (single version)
- Label: Atlantic
- Songwriters: Thom Bell; Linda Creed
- Producer: Thom Bell

The Spinners singles chronology
"Love Don't Love Nobody (Part 1)" (1974)	"Living a Little, Laughing a Little" (1975)	"Sadie" (1975)

Official audio
- "Living a Little, Laughing a Little" on YouTube

"Living a Little, Laughing a Little" is a song recorded by the American R&B vocal group The Spinners. It was written by Thom Bell and Linda Creed. The song was released as a single from their 1974 album New and Improved in February 1975.

The single debuted at number #77, and peaked at number #37 on the Billboard Hot 100 chart.

== Reception ==
Billboard magazine wrote "One of our premier pop/soul groups put together their usual satir smooth sound on this wonderful ballad. Superb lead vocals bounce of the always excellent Spinners' chorus. Song works well as a story." A Record World reviewer calls the song a "wide-eyed mid-tempo monster".

== Charts ==
Chart (1975)	Peak Position
Canada RPM Top Singles	43
US Billboard Hot 100	37

== John Hiatt version ==
"Living a Little, Laughing a Little"

Single by John Hiatt

from the album Warming Up to the Ice Age
- B-side: "I'm a Real Man"
- Released: 1985
- Genre: Rock
- Length: 4:03 (album version); 3:42 (single version)
- Label: Geffen
- Songwriters: Thom Bell; Linda Creed
- Producer: Norbert Putnam

John Hiatt singles chronology
"Zero House" (1985)	"Living a Little, Laughing a Little" (1985)	"Thank You Girl" (1987)

Music video
- "Living a Little, Laughing a Little" on YouTube

John Hiatt recorded his version of "Living a Little, Laughing a Little" for his seventh studio album, Warming Up to the Ice Age. His version was released as a single in early 1985, with "I'm a Real Man" as the B-side. His version is a duet with English singer-songwriter Elvis Costello. A music video was also made for the song.
