= It's a Shame (The Spinners song) =

1970 single by the Spinners, produced by Stevie Wonder

Single by the Spinners

from the album 2nd Time Around
- B-side: "Together We Can Make Such Sweet Music" (1st ver.)
- Released: June 11, 1970
- Recorded: 1969–1970
- Studio: Golden World (Studio B) (Detroit, Michigan)
- Genre: Soul
- Length: 3:12
- Label: V.I.P. V-25057
- Songwriters: Stevie Wonder; Lee Garrett; Syreeta Wright
- Producer: Stevie Wonder

The Spinners singles chronology
"Message from a Black Man" (1970)	"It's a Shame" (1970)	"We'll Have It Made" (1971)

Official audio
- "It's a Shame" on YouTube

"It's a Shame" is a song co-written by Stevie Wonder, Syreeta Wright and Lee Garrett and produced by Wonder as a single for the Spinners on Motown's V.I.P. Records label. The single became the Detroit-reared group's biggest single on the Motown Records label since they had signed with the company in 1964 and also their biggest hit in a decade.

The Spinner's line-up include original members Pervis Jackson, Henry Fambrough, Billy Henderson and Bobby Smith and lead vocalist G. C. Cameron. The quintet recorded the single in 1970.

The song, which is about a man who complains about a lover's "messin' around" on him, became a huge hit for the group peaking at number 14 on the Billboard Hot 100 the week of October 17, 1970 and number 3 on the R&B singles chart, making it one of their biggest hits to date. The song was the first song Wonder produced by himself for another act.

Beverly Dewitt Yancey, the father of hip-hop producer J Dilla, claims to have ghost-written the song and sold it to Motown, but the song's attributed writers dispute this.

== Chart performance ==
=== Weekly charts ===
Weekly chart performance for "It's a Shame"
Chart (1970)	Peak position
Canada RPM	36
UK Singles Chart	20
US Billboard Hot 100	14
US Cashbox Top 100	15
US Billboard Hot Soul Singles	4

=== Year-end charts ===
Year-end chart performance for "It's a Shame"
Chart (1970)	Rank
US Billboard Hot 100	76
US R&B (Billboard)	13
US Cashbox Top 100	87

== Certifications ==
Region	Certification	Certified units/sales
United Kingdom (BPI)	Silver	200,000^{‡}
^{‡} Sales+streaming figures based on certification alone.

== Personnel ==
- Lead vocals by G. C. Cameron
- Background vocals by Bobby Smith, Pervis Jackson, Henry Fambrough and Billy Henderson
- Instrumentation by Stevie Wonder and the Funk Brothers
- Arranged by Paul Riser
