= Ivy Jo Hunter =

Record producer and musician (1940–2022)

Background information
- Born: George Ivy Hunter; August 28, 1940; Detroit, Michigan, U.S.
- Died: October 6, 2022 (aged 82)
- Genre: R&B
- Occupations: Songwriter; record producer; singer

George Ivy Hunter (August 28, 1940 – October 6, 2022), known as Ivy Jo Hunter, was an American R&B songwriter, record producer and singer, most associated with his work for Motown in the 1960s.

== Life and career ==
Raised in Detroit, Michigan, Hunter was trained in orchestral music — primarily trumpet and keyboards. After a stint in the United States Army, Hunter began performing as a singer in the proto-soul venues around Detroit, where he became friends with songwriter Hank Cosby. Cosby introduced him to Motown's first A&R man, William "Mickey" Stevenson. Hunter played keyboards on Motown sessions before Stevenson began working with him as a songwriter. He became a principal in the Motown Records house band, and began to write some of the most significant hits of the early Motown years.

Hunter's songs included The Spinners' "Truly Yours" and "Sweet Thing"; The Temptations' "Sorry Is a Sorry Word"; The Isley Brothers' "Behind a Painted Smile" and "My Love Is Your Love (Forever)"; and "Ask the Lonely" and "Loving You Is Sweeter Than Ever" for the Four Tops. With Marvin Gaye and Stevenson, he co-wrote the Martha and the Vandellas hit "Dancing in the Street" which, in the fall of 1964, provided an American counterpart to the British Invasion. Hunter also produced and wrote songs for Motown artists like The Velvelettes (their single "That's a Funny Way"), The Contours (their 1964 hit, "Can You Jerk Like Me"), The Marvelettes (their hits "Danger Heartbreak Dead Ahead" and "I'll Keep Holding On"), Gladys Knight & the Pips (the album track "The Stranger") and Gaye, for whom he produced the Top 40 hit single "You" in 1968.

Hunter continued to write, produce, serve as session musician, and perform. As a vocalist he recorded a great deal of material with Motown during the 1960s, including demos of his own compositions, but nothing was released until 1970, when Motown issued an Ivy Jo single on their soon-to-be discontinued VIP label entitled "I Remember When (Dedicated to Beverly)". The following year another single on VIP was issued entitled "I'd Still Love You". An album was also planned with the title Ivy Jo is in this Bag, but was shelved. Shortly after this, he left Motown.

In 1970, he contributed to Funkadelic's "Mommy, What's A Funkadelic?" on that band's eponymous first album. He also co-produced an album for Wee Gee (William Howard), the former lead singer of The Dramatics, which included the hit "Hold On (To Your Dream)", which has become a favorite in graduation ceremonies. In 2009, he took part in celebrations to mark Motown's 50th anniversary.

Hunter died on October 6, 2022, at the age of 82.
