= G. C. Cameron =

American rhythm and blues singer

- Born: George Curtis Cameron; September 21, 1945 (age 80); McCall Creek, Mississippi, U.S.
- Genres: R&B; soul
- Occupation: Singer
- Years active: 1970–present

George Curtis Cameron (born September 21, 1945) is an American soul and R&B singer perhaps best known as the lead singer of The Spinners on their 1970 hit "It's a Shame" and for his 1975 hit "It's So Hard to Say Goodbye to Yesterday". He is credited with having "six different voices."

== The Spinners ==
After serving in the Vietnam War with the Marines, Cameron joined Motown act The Spinners as lead singer (although original lead singer Bobby Smith also retained his lead position). He sang both lead parts on their first big hit, 1970's "It's a Shame", co-written and produced by Stevie Wonder. However, when The Spinners left Motown the next year, Cameron remained with Motown as a solo artist.

Cameron rejoined The Spinners in 2000, after then-current frontman John Edwards suffered a stroke. Cameron remained with The Spinners well into the early 2000s; during that time he appeared with them on a PBS music special, singing his 1970 hit "It's A Shame", before leaving again to join The Temptations in 2003.

== Solo artist ==
Releasing several solo singles in the early 1970s, he became known for his ability to sound like other artists such as Smokey Robinson on his song "(Don't Wanna) Play Pajama Games", Curtis Mayfield on "No Matter Where", and The Isley Brothers on his duet with Willie Hutch "Come Get This Thang". Although Cameron was not a major-seller for the label, he did have a hit with "It's So Hard to Say Goodbye to Yesterday", the theme song of the 1975 film Cooley High, which was later covered by Boyz II Men.

Cameron left Motown after the 1970s and toured as an independent artist. He recorded a critically acclaimed album for Malaco Records in 1983 and his career was revived in 1989 with recordings for British record companies Ardent (owned at the time by Paul Mooney) and Motorcity (owned by Ian Levine). He also recorded another solo album titled Shadows. Shadows was co-produced by Ben Obi of Savannah Street Music.

== The Temptations (2003–2007) ==
G.C. Cameron left the group in June 2007 to focus on his solo career.

== 2008–present ==
On Saturday, May 17, 2008, Cameron made a special guest appearance at a benefit concert for Hold on to Education Foundation Inc. in Cherry Hill which is in South Jersey. He received proclamations from New Jersey State Senator Diane Allen; and Jacqueline Jennings, mayor of Willingboro, New Jersey with Councilman Eddie Campbell Jr. of Willingboro. Cherry Hill High School West a cappella vocal group Men of Note and Ms. Marilyn Marshall paid tribute to Cameron in honor of his contribution to American popular music and his dedication to youth education. In late 2008, he appeared on the PBS special Love Train: The Sound of Philadelphia, singing The Spinners' hit "The Rubberband Man".

In 2008, G.C. Cameron began working with reggae band Dub Nation on their album Rising Force For Change. Released in early 2012, the album features reggae renditions of his hits "It's A Shame" and "It's So Hard to Say Goodbye to Yesterday" in addition to a collection of new songs. In 2009, Cameron released the album Enticed Ecstasy.

== Discography ==
- 1971: "Act Like a Shotgun"
- 1972: "Don't Wanna Play Pajama Games"
- 1973: "No Matter Where"
- 1974: "Let Me Down Easy"
- 1974: Love Songs & Other Tragedies
- 1974: "Topics"
- 1975: "It's So Hard to Say Goodbye to Yesterday"
- 1976: G.C. Cameron
- 1977: You're What's Missing in My Life
- 1977: Rich Love, Poor Love with Syreeta
- 1983: Give Me Your Love
- 1991: Right or Wrong
- 2001: Shadows
- 2009: Enticed Ecstasy
- 2012: Rising Force for Change with Dub Nation
