= The Spinners (American group) =

American soul music vocal group

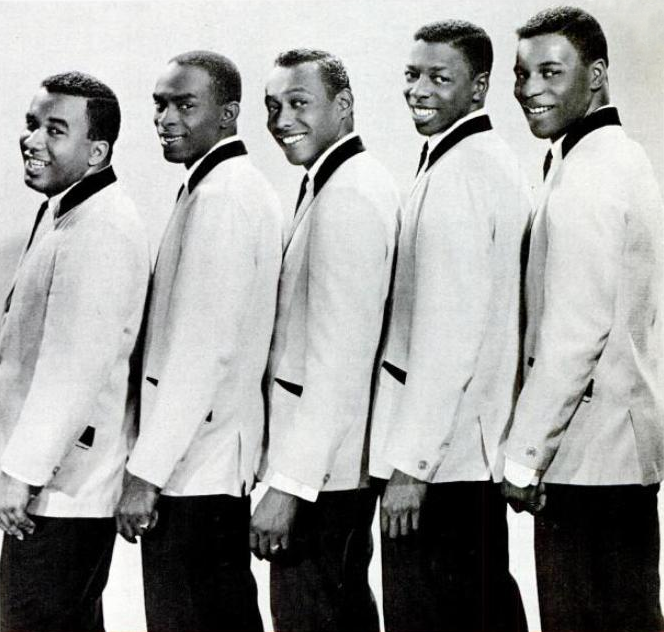
- The Spinners in 1965. From left to right: Billy Henderson, Edgar Edwards, Bobby Smith, Henry Fambrough, and Pervis Jackson.

Background information
- Also known as: Detroit Spinners; Motown Spinners
- Origin: Detroit, Michigan, U.S.
- Genres: Soul; R&B; smooth soul; Philadelphia soul; doo-wop
- Years active: 1954–present
- Labels: Tri-Phi, Motown, V.I.P. (Motown), Atlantic
- Members: C. J. Jefferson; Jessie Robert Peck; Ronnie Moss; Keith A. Patterson
- Past members: Henry Fambrough; Pervis Jackson; Billy Henderson; C. P. Spencer; James Edwards; Bobby Smith; George Dixon; Edgar "Chico" Edwards; G. C. Cameron; Philippé Wynne; John Edwards; Frank Washington; Harold "Spike" Bonhart; Charlton Washington; Marvin Taylor

The Spinners are an American rhythm and blues vocal group that formed in Detroit, Michigan, in 1954. They enjoyed a string of hit singles and albums during the 1960s and 1970s, particularly with producer Thom Bell. The group continues to tour, without any original members, after Henry Fambrough retired in 2023.

In the UK the group was billed as the Motown Spinners and later the Detroit Spinners to avoid confusion with a British folk group also called the Spinners. On June 30, 1976, they received a star on the Hollywood Walk of Fame. The Spinners were inducted into the National Rhythm & Blues Hall of Fame in 2015 and the Rock and Roll Hall of Fame in 2023.

== History ==
In 1954, Billy Henderson, Henry Fambrough, Pervis Jackson, C. P. Spencer, and James Edwards formed the Domingoes in Detroit, Michigan. The friends resided in Detroit's Herman Gardens public housing project and came together to make music.

James Edwards remained with the group for a few weeks and was replaced by Bobby Smith, who sang lead on most of the Spinners' early records and some of their biggest Atlantic Records hits. Spencer left the group shortly after Edwards, and later joined the Voice Masters and the Originals. George Dixon replaced Spencer, and the group renamed themselves the Spinners in 1961.

=== Early recording years: 1961–1971 ===
The Spinners' first single, "That's What Girls Are Made For", was recorded under Harvey Fuqua's Tri-Phi Records. One source stated that Fuqua sang lead vocals on the recording. The single peaked at number 27 on the Top 100 chart in August 1961. Other sources claim that Smith sang lead vocal on this track, coached by Fuqua. The group's follow-up single, "Love (I'm So Glad) I Found You", also featured lead vocals by Smith. This song reached number 91 that November, and was the last Tri-Phi Records single to reach the Top 100.

Sources debate the extent to which Fuqua became a member of the group during its stay at Tri-Phi. Fuqua sang lead on some of the singles and considered himself a Spinner. In the credits on Tri-Phi 1010 and 1024, the artist was credited for the first two singles and listed as "Harvey (Formerly of the Moonglows and the Spinners)". However, most sources do not list him as an official member.

James Edwards's brother, Edgar "Chico" Edwards, replaced Dixon in the group in 1963, at which time Tri-Phi and its entire artist roster was bought out by Fuqua's brother-in-law, Berry Gordy of Motown Records.

In 1964, the Spinners made their debut at the Apollo Theater and were received with high favor. "I'll Always Love You" hit number 35 in 1965. From 1966 to 1969, the group released one single a year, but only the 1966 single "Truly Yours" peaked on the Billboard R&B chart at number 16.

With limited commercial success, Motown assigned the Spinners as road managers, chaperones, and chauffeurs for other groups, and even as shipping clerks. G. C. Cameron replaced Edgar "Chico" Edwards in 1967, and in 1969, the group switched to the Motown-owned V.I.P. imprint.

In 1970, after a five-year absence, they hit number 14 on the Billboard Hot 100 with writer-producer Stevie Wonder's composition, (the G.C. Cameron-led) "It's a Shame" (co-written by Syreeta Wright) which incorporated heavy funk elements. They charted again the following year with another Wonder song, "We'll Have It Made" (led by Cameron), from their new album, 2nd Time Around. However, they were their last two singles for V.I.P.

Shortly after the release of 2nd Time Around, Atlantic Records recording artist Aretha Franklin suggested the group finish their Motown contract and sign with Atlantic Records. While recording an album that Stevie Wonder was producing for them, their Motown contract expired, leaving the LP unfinished. The group then made the switch, but contractual obligations prevented Cameron from leaving Motown, so he stayed on there as a solo artist. He urged his cousin, singer Philippé Wynne, to join the Spinners in his place as one of the group's lead singers along with Bobby Smith.

=== Peak commercial success ===
When the Spinners signed with Atlantic in 1972, they were a commercially unremarkable singing group. They had never had a top ten pop hit—despite having been a recording act for over a decade. Things changed, with songwriter Thom Bell leading them, the Spinners charted five Top 100 singles (and two Top Tens) from their first post-Motown album, Spinners (1973), and went on to become one of the most popular soul groups of the 1970s.

The Bobby Smith-led "I'll Be Around", their first top ten hit, was actually the B-side of their first Atlantic single, the Fambrough- and Wynne-led "How Could I Let You Get Away". Radio airplay for the B-side led Atlantic to flip the single over, with "I'll Be Around" hitting number 3 and "How Could I Let You Get Away" reaching number 77. "I'll Be Around" was also the Spinners' first million-selling hit single. It was awarded a gold disc by the RIAA on October 30, 1972.

The 1973 follow-up singles "Could It Be I'm Falling in Love", (led principally by Smith, with Wynne leading on the tune's fade out), which was another million-seller, "One of a Kind (Love Affair)" (led by Wynne), and "Ghetto Child" (led by Fambrough and Wynne) cemented the group's reputation, as well as further that of Bell, a noted Philly soul producer.

Following their Atlantic successes, Motown also issued a Best of the Spinners album which featured selections from their Motown/V.I.P. recordings. They also remixed and reissued the 1970 B-side "Together We Can Make Such Sweet Music" (led by Smith, originally co-led by Cameron) as a 1973 A-side. In the midst of their Atlantic hits, it crawled to number 91 in the US.

The group's 1974 follow-up album, Mighty Love, featured three Top 20 hits, "I'm Coming Home", "Love Don't Love Nobody", and the title track. Their biggest hit of the year, however, was a collaboration with Dionne Warwick, "Then Came You" (led by Smith, Warwick, and Wynne), which hit number one on the Billboard Hot 100, becoming each act's first chart-topping "pop" hit. The song also reached the Top 3 of Billboard′s R&B and Easy Listening charts.

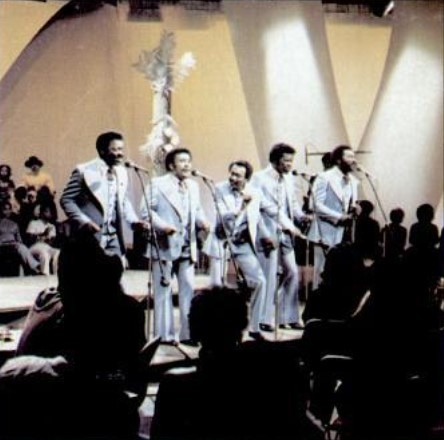
The Spinners in 1973.

The Spinners hit the Top 10 twice in the next two years with the Smith and Jackson-led "They Just Can't Stop It (The Games People Play)" (Billboard number 5) and the Wynne-led "The Rubberband Man" (Billboard number 2). "Games People Play" featured guest vocalist Evette L. Benton (though producer Bell disputed this in a UK-based interview, claiming Evette's line was actually group member Henry Fambrough – his voice sped up), and led to the nickname "Mister 12:45" for bass singer Jackson, after his signature vocal line on the song. Now at the height of their commercial and critical popularity, the band started a scholarship program to help send one student to college per year.

=== Later years ===
Conflict and egos began emerging in the group when member Philippé Wynne wanted the group's name changed to Philippe Wynne and the Spinners. When this was not done, Wynne left the group in January 1977 and was replaced by John Edwards, who had recorded a number of R&B hits as a solo singer. Wynne had a solo career and entered the business end of music, forming a publishing group and record label. The group continued recording and scored some minor hits in 1977 and 1978. Thom Bell and the group parted ways. They contributed two songs to Bell's film The Fish That Saved Pittsburgh and appeared in the film as a band. In 1979, Motown released a compilation album on both sides of the Atlantic. From the Vaults, (US Natural Resources label NR 4014 and in the UK on Tamla Motown STMR 9001), included the song "What More Could a Boy Ask For" (Fuqua & Bristol), which was recorded circa 1965.

The group scored two major hits at the dawning of the new decade: in 1980 with "Working My Way Back to You"/"Forgive Me, Girl" (number two in March–April, number one UK) and "Cupid"/"I've Loved You for a Long Time" (number four in July–August, number four UK). On the same album, the group recorded "Split Decision" which had the same potential to be a hit but received little promotion. The group's last US Hot 100 hit was a remake of Willie Nelson's "Funny How Time Slips Away", which peaked at number 67 in 1983. That same year, the group guest-starred as themselves on the TV sitcom Laverne and Shirley. In 1984, the group had their last notable R&B hit with "Right or Wrong", from that year's Cross Fire album. They went on to release two further albums, in addition to performing the title track to the 1987 hit film Spaceballs, during the latter half of the 1980s, with no singles from these projects getting beyond number 70 on the R&B chart.

After some years spent collaborating with Parliament-Funkadelic and working solo, Wynne died of a heart attack while performing in Oakland, California, on July 14, 1984.

In a 2014 interview, Henry Fambrough, the group's last surviving original member, stated: "Bobby (Smith) was always our major lead singer for all those years. Had always been. Always will be." Fambrough has led on several Spinners songs on which he sang or shared lead vocals, including: "I Don't Want to Lose You", "Ghetto Child", "Living a Little, Laughing a Little", "Ain't No Price on Happiness", "Smile We Have Each Other", "Just as Long as We Have Love", (a second Spinners duet with Dionne Warwick) and "Now That We're Together".

=== The Spinners today ===
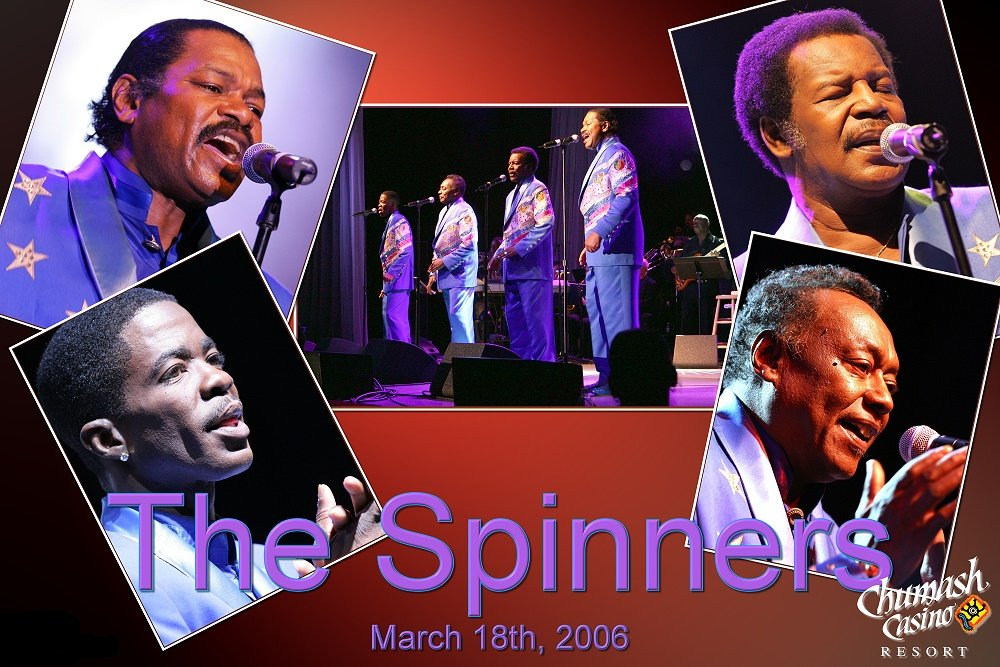
Ad for the Spinners in concert at the Chumash Casino Resort in Santa Ynez, California, on March 18, 2006

After their chart career ended, the Spinners continued touring for decades. They are draws on the oldies and nostalgia concert circuits. In their box set, The Chrome Collection, the Spinners were lauded by David Bowie and Elvis Costello. They were inducted on October 4, 2015, into the National Rhythm & Blues Hall of Fame and in the Vocal Group Hall of Fame in 1999. On July 27, 2006, the Spinners performed on the Late Show with David Letterman. G. C. Cameron rejoined the group as lead vocalist from 2000 to 2002 (replacing John Edwards, who left due to a stroke), but he left in 2003 to join the Temptations. Frank Washington, formerly of the Futures and the Delfonics, joined for a few years, before being replaced by Charlton Washington (no relation).

In 2004, original member Billy Henderson was dismissed from the group after suing the group's corporation and business manager to obtain financial records. He was replaced by Harold "Spike" Bonhart. Henderson died due to complications from diabetes on February 2, 2007, at the age of 67. Another early member, C. P. Spencer, had already died from a heart attack on October 20, 2004.

Original member Pervis Jackson, who was still touring as a member of the group, died from cancer on August 18, 2008. The group continued for a short time as a quartet before Jessie Robert Peck (born in Queens, New York, December 17, 1968) was recruited as the group's new bass vocalist in February 2009. In 2009, Bonhart left the Spinners and was replaced by vocalist Marvin Taylor. The group lost another member from their early days, when Edgar "Chico" Edwards died on December 3, 2011.

The Spinners were in the limelight again in 2003 when an Elton John track was re-issued featuring them on backing vocals. In 1977, the Spinners had recorded two versions of "Are You Ready for Love" at the Philadelphia studios. One had all of the Spinners, the other with only lead singer Philippé Wynne on backing vocals. Elton John was not happy with the mixes and sat on the tapes for a year before asking for them to be remixed, so they would sound easier on the ear. Finally, in 1979, the Wynne version was released as a single, but it only made it to number 42 in the UK. The track was then remixed by Ashley Beedle from Xpress-2 in 2003 after becoming a fixture in the Balearic nightclubs, and being used by Sky Sports for an advertisement. It then went to number one on the UK singles chart after being released on DJ Fatboy Slim's Southern Fried Records.

In September 2011, 57 years after forming in Detroit and 50 years after "That's What Girls Are Made For", the group was announced as one of 15 final nominees for the Rock & Roll Hall of Fame, their first nomination, they were also nominated in 2014, 2015, and 2023. Lead singer Bobby Smith died on March 16, 2013. In 2017, the Spinners were inducted into the Michigan Rock and Roll Legends Hall of Fame. Charlton Washington left the group in 2020 to pursue a solo career and was replaced by C. J. Jefferson. After years without new music, the Spinners released 'Round the Block and Back Again on August 27, 2021, the first with the current lineup and the final before Fambrough's retirement. The album had three singles: "Cliché", "In Holy Matrimony", and "Vivid Memories".

In early 2023, Fambrough retired from the group, after almost 70 years as a member.

On May 3, 2023, after three previous nominations, the Spinners—with its classic 1970s lineup of Fambrough, Smith, Jackson, Henderson, Edwards and Wynne—were picked as inductees for the 2023 class of the Rock and Roll Hall of Fame, nearly 70 years after the group had first formed. In May 2023, the group donated hundreds of items for their performing and recording history to Motown Museum in Detroit.

Henry Fambrough, the last surviving original member of the Spinners, died on February 7, 2024 at age 85.

John Edwards died at age 80 on May 11, 2025. With Edwards death, G.C. Cameron, who led the group on "It's A Shame", remains as the last member of the Spinners' hit years.

== Personnel ==
Current members

- Jessie Peck – bass (2009–present)
- Keith A. Patterson – lead vocals, tenor (2025–present)
- Ronnie Moss – tenor, lead vocals (2013–present)
- C. J. Jefferson – lead vocals, baritone (2020–present)

Former members

- Henry Fambrough – baritone, lead vocals (1954–2023; died 2024)
- Pervis Jackson – bass (1954–2008; died 2008)
- Billy Henderson – tenor, baritone (1954–2004; died 2007)
- C. P. Spencer – lead vocals, tenor (1954–1956; died 2004)
- James Edwards – tenor (1954)
- Bobby Smith – lead vocals, tenor (1954–2013; died 2013)
- George W. Dixon – lead vocals, tenor (1956–1963; died 2007)
- Edgar "Chico" Edwards – lead vocals, tenor (1963–1967; died 2011)
- G. C. Cameron – lead vocals, tenor (1967–1972, 2000–2003)
- Philippé Wynne – lead vocals, tenor (1972–1977; died 1984)
- John Edwards – lead vocals, tenor (1977–2000; died 2025)
- Frank Washington – lead vocals, tenor (2003–2007)
- Harold "Spike" Bonhart – tenor, baritone (2004–2009)
- Charlton Washington – lead vocals, tenor (2007-2020)
- Marvin Taylor – tenor (2009–2025), baritone (2009–2013), lead vocals (2013–2025)

== Discography ==
=== Top 40 singles ===
The following singles reached the top 40 on the US or UK charts.

List of singles, with selected chart positions
Title	Year	Peak chart positions		
Title	Year	US	US R&B chart	UK
"That's What Girls Are Made For"	1961	27	5	—
"I'll Always Love You"	1965	35	8	—
"It's a Shame"	1970	14	4	20
"How Could I Let You Get Away" (A-side) "I'll Be Around" (B-side)	1972	77; 3	14; 1	— —
"Could It Be I'm Falling in Love"	1972	4	1	11
"One of a Kind (Love Affair)"	1973	11	1	—
"Ghetto Child"	1973	29	4	7
"Mighty Love"	1974	20	1	33
"I'm Coming Home"	1974	18	3	—
"Then Came You" (with Dionne Warwick)	1974	1	2	29
"Love Don't Love Nobody"	1974	15	4	—
"Living a Little, Laughing a Little"	1975	37	7	—
"Sadie"	1975	54	7	—
"Games People Play"	1975	5	1	–
"Love or Leave"	1975	36	8	—
"Wake Up Susan"	1976	56	11	29
"The Rubberband Man"	1976	2	1	16
"Body Language"	1979	—	35	40
"Working My Way Back to You" / "Forgive Me, Girl" (medley)	1979	2	6	1
"Cupid" / "I've Loved You for a Long Time" (medley)	1980	4	5	4
"I'll Be Around" (Rappin' 4-Tay featuring The Spinners)	1995	39	37	30
"—" denotes a recording that did not chart or was not released in that territory.
