= Philippé Wynne =

Musical artist (1941–84)

Background information
- Also known as: Soul Walker Wynne
- Born: Phillip Walker; April 3, 1941; Cincinnati, Ohio, U.S.
- Died: July 14, 1984 (aged 43) Oakland, California, U.S.
- Genres: Soul; R&B
- Occupation: Singer
- Instrument: Vocals
- Years active: 1968–1984
- Labels: Atlantic; Sugar Hill

Philippé Wynne (aka Philippe Escalante Wynn; né Walker; April 3, 1941 – July 14, 1984) was an American singer, best known for his role as a lead vocalist of The Spinners (a role he shared with fellow group members Bobby Smith and Henry Fambrough). Wynne scored notable hits such as "How Could I Let You Get Away", "The Rubberband Man", and "One of a Kind (Love Affair)". After leaving The Spinners, Wynne never regained the same success, although he was featured in hits by other artists such as "(Not Just) Knee Deep" by Funkadelic. Wynne died of a heart attack while performing at a nightclub.

== Life and career ==
Born in Cincinnati, Ohio, and raised in the New Orphanage Asylum for Colored Children in Cincinnati, Ohio, Wynne went to Detroit in the early 1960s and began his musical career with his brother Michael Walker as a gospel singer. He soon switched to R&B and attained some measure of success, singing with Bootsy Collins 's Pacemakers in 1968. Wynne then spent time in Germany as the lead singer of the Afro Kings, a band from Liberia, before he replaced his cousin, G. C. Cameron, as one of the lead vocalists for The Spinners. He sang with the group until 1977, during which they achieved several successful albums and singles.

Wynne was one of three lead singers of the Spinners, but after several years with the group, he wanted the group's name changed to Philippe Wynn and the Spinners. When this was denied, he left the group and launched a solo career, with Alan Thicke as his manager. Wynne also shifted his focus to the business end of the music industry, making a publishing group and record label. With Wynne's departure, neither Wynne nor the Spinners would experience the level of success they had when they were together. Wynne's first album Starting All Over was released on Cotillion Records in 1977 but had limited success and no hit singles. He was released from his Cotillion Records contract. He began working with George Clinton's Parliament-Funkadelic in 1979. He performed with them on several recordings, and was a featured vocalist on the Funkadelic single "(Not Just) Knee Deep" (a No. 1 hit on the Billboard R&B chart). While associated with Parliament-Funkadelic, Wynne also appeared on the Bootsy Collins album Sweat Band. Wynne released what would be his second solo album, Wynne Jammin', in 1980 with Uncle Jam Records, a label fronted by George Clinton and Clinton's manager Archie Ivy. However, the album was not a major seller. Wynne made a guest appearance on the song "Something Inside My Head" by Gene Dunlap, and in the song "Whip It" by the Treacherous Three. Wynne's final album was the self-titled Philippé Wynne, released by Sugar Hill Records in 1984.

== Family ==
His parents, DeGree Walker and Annie (née Wynn) divorced in November 1947 in Cincinnati, Ohio. Around 1952, Philippe and his three siblings – Annie Walker, who later became an opera singer, Michael Leon Walker, and Margaret Walker – were placed in the New Orphan Asylum for Colored Children (which closed in 1967), in the Avondale neighborhood of Cincinnati, on Van Buren Street. Their father, DeGree Walker, was granted custody after the divorce, although he worked as a contractor in construction and had to travel. Their mother, Annie, had run off to Detroit with another man.

I guess the hardest part to take was being there and knowing that both of your parents were still alive.

— Philippé Wynne, 1981

Around 1956, Philippé and his brother, Michael, ran away from the orphanage and headed to Detroit, Michigan to find their mother. In Detroit, the two formed a gospel group called the Walker Singers. This lasted until Philippe adopted his mother's surname, Wynn (initially without an "e"), and moved on to The Spinners as lead singer.

=== Marriage and children ===
Wynne married Ava Leflor on February 1, 1973, in Las Vegas, Nevada. They had two sons, Emmanuel Wynn (1974–2001) and Alvarez Escalante Wynn (1975–1999). He also has an older son by the name of Cedrick born in April 1973 who currently resides in Detroit, Michigan. Ava was from the Los Angeles suburb of Compton, California, and the four of them moved back to California after Philippé left The Spinners. Philippé and Ava eventually divorced. Alvarez was killed in a drive-by shooting in Compton in 1999 and Emmanuel, who was living in Daytona Beach, Florida, drowned two years later in 2001 while trying to save a man. Emmanuel was posthumously given the Carnegie Medal for his heroism.

== Death ==
On July 13, 1984, Wynne suffered a heart attack while performing at a nightclub in Oakland, California. He died the next day, at the age of 43.

He was posthumously inducted into the Rock and Roll Hall of Fame in 2023 as a member of the Spinners.

== Discography ==
=== Albums ===
- Starting All Over – Cotillion – SD 9920, 1977
- Wynne Jammin' – Uncle Jam – JZ 36843, 1980
- Philippe Wynne – Sugarhill – SH-9204, 1984

== See also ==
- Catfish Collins
- Sugarhill Records

== Bibliography ==
- Romanski, Patricia and Holly George-Warren (Editors). The Rolling Stone Encyclopedia of Rock & Roll. New York, NY: Fireside, 2005.
