= Billy Henderson (American singer) =

American musician (1939–2007)

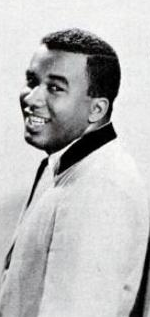
- Henderson in 1965

Background information
- Born: William Henderson; August 9, 1939; Indianapolis, Indiana, U.S.
- Died: February 2, 2007 (aged 67) Daytona Beach, Florida, U.S.
- Occupation: Singer
- Years active: 1954–2004
- Formerly of: The Spinners

William Henderson (August 9, 1939 – February 2, 2007) was an American singer, best known for being an original member and founder of The Spinners, a soul vocal group.

== The Spinners ==
He and four friends at Lincoln High School in 1954 formed a group originally called The Domingos and later renamed The Spinners. They had several hits, especially in the 1970s, including "I'll Be Around" (1972) and "Could It Be I'm Falling in Love", "Then Came You" (with Dionne Warwick), "The Rubberband Man" and "It's a Shame".

"It's a Shame" is a song co-written by Stevie Wonder, Syreeta Wright and Lee Garrett, and produced by Wonder as a single for The Spinners on Motown's V.I.P. Records label. Recorded in 1970, it became the Detroit-reared group's biggest single on the Motown Records company since they had signed with the company in 1964 and also their biggest hit in a decade. The lineup of the quintet included original members Pervis Jackson, Henry Fambrough, Billy Henderson and Bobby Smith and lead vocalist G. C. Cameron. The song, which is about a man who complains about a lover's "messin' around" on him, became a huge hit for the group, reaching number 14 on the Billboard Hot 100 and number three on the R&B singles chart, making it their biggest hit to date. The song was the first song Wonder produced for another act by himself.

Henderson was considered to be the best dancer in The Spinners and was known for his animated stage presence, although he was the only member out of the classic five to not sing any lead vocals, Henderson was more focused on the dancing and being the background second tenor in the middle and was also one of the founders of The Spinners.

The Spinners were nominated for six Grammy Awards and they received a star on the Hollywood Walk of Fame, the second star for a musical group consisting of Afro Americans. Henderson remained with the group for exactly half a century, until 2004.

He was posthumously inducted into the Rock and Roll Hall of Fame in 2023 as a member of the Spinners.

== Personal life and death ==
William Henderson was born on August 9, 1939, in Indianapolis, and grew up in Royal Oak Charter Township, Michigan.

Henderson died in Daytona Beach, Florida, from complications caused by diabetes on February 2, 2007, at the age of 67. His grave is located at Detroit's Woodlawn Cemetery.

Henderson and his wife Barbara had three sons: Charles, Sterling and Joseph.

== See also ==
- It's a Shame (The Spinners song)
