= Henry Fambrough =

American singer (1938–2024)

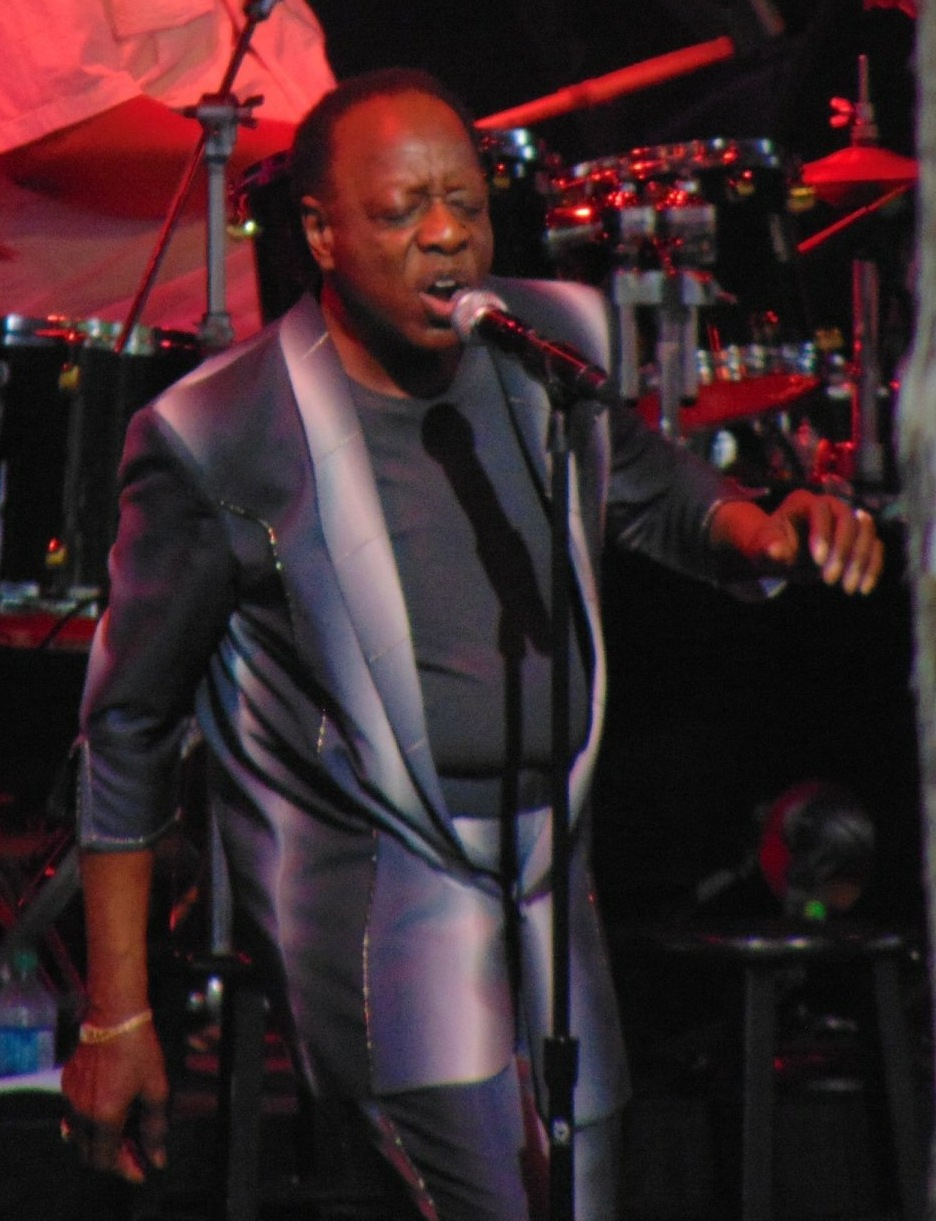
- Fambrough performing with The Spinners in 2018

Background information
- Born: May 10, 1938; Monroe, Georgia, U.S.
- Died: February 7, 2024 (aged 85) Sterling, Virginia, U.S.
- Genres: R&B; pop; soul
- Occupation: Singer
- Years active: 1954–2023
- Label: Motown Atlantic
- Formerly of: The Spinners

Henry Lee Fambrough (May 10, 1938 – February 7, 2024) was an American vocalist, known for being a member of the R&B quintet The Spinners (also called The Detroit Spinners and The Motown Spinners) from 1954 until his retirement in April 2023. He was the last surviving original member of The Spinners from 2013 until his death.

== The Spinners ==
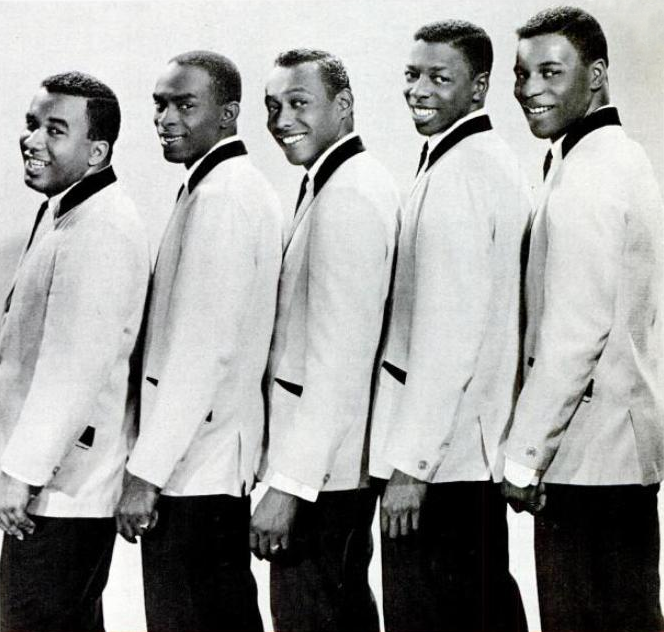
Henry Fambrough (second from right) as part of The Spinners in 1965

The Spinners formed in 1954 in Ferndale, Michigan, as the Domingoes before changing their name to the Spinners. Fambrough was drafted into the U.S. Army in 1961 and on his return two years later, the Spinners signed up under Motown Records. They did not have any big hits for the next six years, and Fambrough ended up working as a chauffeur for the mother of label boss Berry Gordy Jr.

During the group's heyday from the early to mid-1970s, Henry served as one of the group's three lead singers (along with Philippé Wynne and Bobby Smith) and his rich baritone provided lead vocals for the Spinners classic "I Don't Want to Lose You", as well as co-lead vocals with Wynne on "Living a Little, Laughing a Little".

On the group's classic single "Ghetto Child", he shared leads with Wynne and Smith. He dueted with Dionne Warwick on the Spinners' "Just As Long As We Have Love", from their 1975 album Pick of the Litter, and sang lead on the classic album cut "If You Can't Be in Love", from the album Happiness Is Being with the Spinners (1976). Fambrough was noted for the whiplash mustache he wore at that time.

With the release of the group's most recent album Round the Block and Back Again in 2021, Fambrough is the only member of the Spinners to have been featured on every release.

=== Retirement ===
In April 2023, Fambrough announced his retirement, but the Spinners continued to perform without him, and he remained involved with the group behind the scenes. He was in the group for sixty-nine years. The following month, the Spinners were inducted into the Rock and Roll Hall of Fame, sixty-nine years after forming, and thirty-seven years after first being eligible to be inducted.

Following his announcement on retiring, he told Spinners fans: "The Spinners are still here and still singing for our people who want to hear us. And that's not going to change. We'll still be there for them."

With the deaths of fellow Spinners members C. P. Spencer in 2004, Billy Henderson in 2007, Pervis Jackson in 2008, and Bobby Smith in 2013, Fambrough was the last original member of the group. Only G. C. Cameron remains from their hit-making years. Fambrough died on February 7, 2024, in Sterling, Virginia, at the age of 85. Fambrough was survived by his wife, Norma and daughter, Heather Williams. His funeral was held in a Detroit church where he was a long-time member and he was interred in Woodlawn Cemetery on the city's north side.

== Sources ==
- Romanski, Patricia; Holly George-Warren, eds. (2005) [2001 (reprinted 2005)]. The Rolling Stone Encyclopedia of Rock & Roll. Consulting Editor: Jon Pareles (Third ed.). New York: Fireside. ISBN 978-0-7432-2055-2. OCLC 923481152.
