= Bobby Smith (singer) =

American singer (1936–2013)

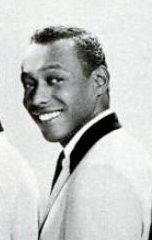
- Smith in 1965

Background information
- Also known as: Bobbie Smith
- Born: Robert Steel Smith; April 10, 1936; Detroit, Michigan, U.S.
- Died: March 16, 2013 (aged 76) Orlando, Florida, U.S.
- Genres: Pop; R&B; soul
- Occupation: Singer
- Years active: 1954–2013

Robert Steel Smith (April 10, 1936 – March 16, 2013) was an American R&B singer notable as the principal lead singer of the classic Motown/Philly group, the Spinners (also known as the Detroit Spinners or the Motown Spinners), throughout its history. He was the principal lead singer from its formation in 1954 when he was eighteen, until his death in 2013.

== The Spinners ==
The Spinners was formed circa 1954 at Lincoln High School in Ferndale, Michigan, just north of the Detroit border. The group had their first record deal when they signed with Tri-Phi Records in early 1961.

Smith had been the group's lead singer since its inception, having sung lead vocals on the Spinners' first hit record in 1961, "That's What Girls Are Made For" (which has been inaccurately credited to the group's mentor and former Moonglows lead singer, Harvey Fuqua). Smith also sang lead on most of their Motown material during the 1960s, such as the charting singles like "Truly Yours" (1966) and "I'll Always Love You" (1965); almost all of the group's pre-Motown material on Fuqua's Tri-Phi Records label, and also on the Spinners' biggest Atlantic Records hits. These included "I'll Be Around", "Could It Be I'm Falling in Love", and "Games People Play". In 1974, they scored their only #1 Pop hit with "Then Came You" (sung by Smith, in collaboration with superstar Dionne Warwick). All four of these Bobby Smith-led songs were Certified Gold by the R.I.A.A.

He was posthumously inducted into the Rock and Roll Hall of Fame in 2023 as a member of the Spinners.

=== Miscredits on records ===
Despite the fact that Smith led on many of the group's biggest hits, many have erroneously credited most of the group's success to its other lead singer, the late Philippé Wynne, who did not join the Spinners until well over a decade after they had formed. The confusion between Smith and Wynne may be due to the similarities in their voices and the fact that they frequently shared lead vocals on many of those hits.

== Death ==
Smith battled lung cancer, and died of pneumonia and influenza on March 16, 2013, at the age of 76.

== Bibliography ==
- Romanski, Patricia and Holly George-Warren (editors). The Rolling Stone Encyclopedia of Rock & Roll. New York, NY: Fireside, 2005. ISBN 978-0743201209
