= Pervis Jackson =

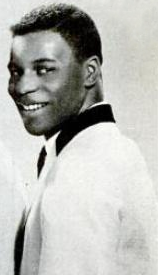
- Jackson in 1965
- Born: May 17, 1938; New Orleans, Louisiana, U.S.
- Died: August 18, 2008 (aged 70); Detroit, Michigan, U.S.
- Occupation: Singer
- Years active: 1954–2008
- Spouse: Claudreen Jackson (m. 1968)
- Musical career
- Genres: R&B; pop; soul
- Instrument: Vocals
- Labels: Motown; Atlantic
- Formerly of: The Spinners

Pervis Jackson (May 17, 1938 – August 18, 2008) was an American R&B singer, noted as the bass singer for The Spinners, and was one of the group's original members as well as their spokesman.

He was a member of the Spinners from its formation in 1954 until his death in August 2008.

== The Spinners ==
The Spinners was formed circa 1954 at Lincoln High School in Ferndale, Michigan, just north of the Detroit border. The group had their first record deal when they signed with Tri-Phi Records in early 1961. His deep timbred voice and calm swagger garnered him a reputation around town and the industry.

The Spinners are known for recording the songs It's a Shame and a disco cover of The Four Seasons 1966 song Working My Way Back to You. Jackson was perhaps best known for his line of "12:45" from the group's Billboard charting Top 10 hit "Games People Play", released in 1975.

He was posthumously inducted into the Rock and Roll Hall of Fame in 2023 as a member of the Spinners.

== Personal life and death ==
Jackson was born in New Orleans, Louisiana, but moved with his family at a very young age to the city of Detroit.

Jackson was still a part of The Spinners up to his death from brain and liver cancer at the age of 70, in Detroit, Michigan, on August 18, 2008. He is buried in Woodlawn Cemetery on the city's North side.
