= Crossfire (disambiguation) =

A crossfire is a military term for the siting of weapons so that their arcs of fire overlap.

Crossfire may also refer to:

== Comics and manga ==
- Crossfire (Eclipse Comics), a hero in the DNAgents universe
- Crossfire (comics), a supervillain in the Marvel Comics fictional Marvel Universe
- Crossfire (manga), a series by Kouta Hirano

== Film ==
- Crossfire (film), 1947 film noir starring Robert Mitchum
- Cross Fire (film), a 1933 Western film

== Gaming ==
- Crossfire (board game), a board game created by the Milton Bradley Company in 1971
- Crossfire (miniatures game), a tabletop wargaming system (1996)
- Crossfire (1981 video game), a 1981 video game created by Jay Sullivan
- Super Airwolf (1991 video game), localized in the US as Cross Fire
- Crossfire (1992 video game), an open source multiplayer online computer role-playing game developed in 1992
- Crossfire (series), a video game series created by Smilegate
  - Crossfire (2007 video game), an online multiplayer first-person shooter game first released in 2007
  - Crossfire (upcoming video game), a singleplayer third-person shooter game
- Mobile Suit Gundam: Crossfire, a PlayStation 3 launch title
- Sid Meier's Alien Crossfire, an expansion pack for Sid Meier's Alpha Centauri

== Literature ==
- Crossfire (novel), a 1998 novel by Miyuki Miyabe
- Crossfire (2007 novel), a novel by ex-SAS soldier Andy McNab
- Cross Fire (novel), a novel by James Patterson
- Crossfire, the fifth novel in the Noughts & Crosses series by Malorie Blackman
- Crossfire, a series of novels by Sylvia Day
- Crossfire: The Plot that Killed Kennedy, a 1989 work by Jim Marrs

== Music ==
=== Albums ===
- Cross Fire (Music Revelation Ensemble album), 1997 album from James Blood Ulmer's Music Revelation Ensemble
- Cross Fire (Spinners album), 1984 album from American soul vocal group The Spinners

=== Bands ===
- Crossfire (band), an Australian jazz fusion ensemble
- CrossFire (folk band), a French folk rock and blues duo
- The Crossfires, a surf instrumental band that later became The Turtles

=== Songs ===
- "Crossfire" (Brandon Flowers song), 2010
- “Crossfire”, a song by 311 from Voyager, 2019
- "Crossfire", a song by The Bellamy Brothers, 1977
- "Crossfire", a song by Die Krupps from II - The Final Option, 1993
- "Crossfire", a song by Jethro Tull from A, 1980
- "Crossfire", a song by Primal Fear from Domination, 2025
- "Crossfire", a song by Scorpions from Love at First Sting, 1984
- “Crossfire”, a song by Stephen from Sincerely, 2015
- "Crossfire", a song by Stevie Ray Vaughan from In Step, 1989
- "The Crossfire", a song by Polaris from Fatalism, 2023
- "The Crossfire", a song by The Tony Danza Tapdance Extravaganza from Danza IIII: The Alpha – The Omega, 2012

== Television ==
- Crossfire (Canadian TV program), a 1955 Canadian current affairs television program that aired on CBC
- Crossfire (American TV program), a 1982–2005 and 2013–2014 nightly American current events debate television program that aired on CNN
- Crossfire (British TV programme), a 1984–2004 UK current affairs programme that aired on Grampian Television (STV)
- Crossfire (British TV series), a 2022 UK thriller, written by Louise Doughty
- "Crossfire" (Batman: Gotham Knight), an episode of Batman: Gotham Knight
- "Crossfire" (Castle), the final episode of Castle
- "Crossfire" (FBI), a 2018 episode
- "Crossfire" (Homeland), an episode from the first season of Showtime series Homeland
- "Crossfire" (Smallville episode), from the ninth season of the TV series
- "Crossfire" (Star Trek: Deep Space Nine), an episode from the fourth season of the television series Star Trek: Deep Space Nine
- "Crossfire" (Supergirl), a season 2 episode of the TV series
- XFire (TV series), a UK reality/TV game show (pronounced Crossfire)

== Other uses ==
- AMD CrossFire, AMD's method for connecting video cards
- Chrysler Crossfire, an automobile, model years 2004-2008
- Crossfire (G.I. Joe), a radio-controlled G.I. Joe vehicle
- Public forum debate, also known as crossfire debate
- cross-fire, a method of locomotion for an animal
- Crossfire (Bangladesh), extrajudicial killings by law enforcement agencies in Bangladesh
- CrossFire, a cross-platform crossword puzzle construction software by Beekeeper Labs
- Washington Crossfire, an amateur soccer team based near Seattle, Washington, U.S.

== See also ==
- Xfire (disambiguation)
