= Forgotten Voices of the Falklands =

- Author: Hugh McManners
- Series: Forgotten Voices
- Subject: History
- Genre: Non-fiction
- Publisher: Ebury Press
- Publication date: 2007
- Publication place: United Kingdom
- Media type: Hardback
- Pages: 477pp
- ISBN: 978-0-09-190880-5
- OCLC: 77012059
- Dewey Decimal: 997.11024 22
- LC Class: F3031.5 .M376 2007
- Preceded by: Forgotten Voices of the Secret War

Forgotten Voices of the Falklands uses the resources of the Imperial War Museum’s Sound Archive to present the first complete oral history of the Falklands War. The book presents a chronicle of the conflict from many different perspectives, told in the participants’ own voices from the initial invasion of the islands to the British landings to the Argentine surrender and its aftermath.

The interviews were brought together by author Hugh McManners, who himself fought in the Falklands War.

In addition to the Imperial War Museum archives, entries for Bill Belcher (3 Commando Brigade Air Squadron) and Jim Mitchell (Scots Guards) were taken from BBC documentary interviews.

== Background ==
In March 1982, Argentina surprised the world by invading the Falkland Islands in the Atlantic Ocean. The tiny islands had long been the subject of a fierce territorial dispute between Argentina and the United Kingdom, and the occupation quickly escalated into a full-blown conflict between the two countries.

Often referred to as a forgotten war, the Falklands conflict was, actually, the first war of the modern age, using satellite surveillance, night observation devices, and all the very latest weaponry military technology had to offer.
