= Forgotten Voices =

Forgotten Voices is a series of audio tapes and books put together by the Imperial War Museum. The sound archive features thousands of interviews with people who survived wars in which the British were involved in the 20th Century. Each book has been compiled by an individual editor, though with the exception of the introduction to each chapter, almost the entirety of each book is made up of the archive extracts.

The series comprises:

- Forgotten Voices of the Great War by Max Arthur
- Forgotten Voices of The Somme by Joshua Levine
- Forgotten Voices of the Blitz and the Battle for Britain by Joshua Levine
- Forgotten Voices of the Second World War by Max Arthur
- Forgotten Voices of D-Day by Roderick Bailey
- Forgotten Voices of the Secret War by Roderick Bailey
- Forgotten Voices of the Holocaust by Lyn Smith
- Forgotten Voices of the Falklands by Hugh McManners
- Forgotten Voices of Burma by Julian Thompson
- Forgotten Voices of Dunkirk by Joshua Levine
- Forgotten Voices of the Victoria Cross by Roderick Bailey
