= Forgotten Voices of the Second World War =

- Author: Max Arthur
- Series: Forgotten Voices
- Subject: History
- Genre: Non-fiction
- Published: 2005 (Ebury Press)
- Publication place: United Kingdom
- ISBN: 978-0-09-190441-8
- Preceded by: Forgotten Voices of the Blitz and the Battle of Britain
- Followed by: Forgotten Voices of the Holocaust

Forgotten Voices of the Second World War is a book written by Max Arthur that consists of interviews with soldiers, sailors, airmen and civilians of most nationalities who saw action during World War II. The interviews were drawn from the Imperial War Museum's sound archive. Many of the recordings had not been heard since the 1970s. As well as putting the interviews into chronological and campaign order, the book also puts the surrounding events into context.
