= Forgotten Voices of the Great War =

British book written in 2002, regarding World War I soldier experiences

- Author: Max Arthur
- Language: English
- Series: Forgotten Voices
- Subject: History
- Genre: Non-fiction
- Publisher: Ebury Press
- Publication date: 2002
- Publication place: United Kingdom
- Media type: Print (hardcover and paperback), audiobook
- Pages: 352
- ISBN: 0-09-188209-5
- OCLC: 789734463
- Followed by: Forgotten Voices of the Blitz and the Battle of Britain

Forgotten Voices of the Great War: Told by those who were there is a collection of interviews with people who lived through the World War I, written by Max Arthur.

In 1960, the Imperial War Museum with a team of academics, archivists and volunteers set about tracing World War I veterans and interviewing them at length in order to record the experiences of ordinary individuals in war. The Museum oral archive has become an important archive of its kind in the world, with thousands of hours of footage. Authors have occasionally been granted access to the vaults.

Circa 2000, the Museum allowed the author and a team of researchers access to the complete audio tapes. Arthur in the writings put the interviews into chronological and campaign order, and provided some context about the events that surround the memories.

The book includes testimonies from Tom Adlam (Victoria Cross awardee), Horace Birks, Edmund Blunden (poet and author, Military Cross awardee), Godfrey Buxton, Charles Carrington (under-age enlistee, Military Cross awardee), Montagu Cleeve (artillery officer), Norman Demuth (under-age enlistee), Mabel Lethbridge (munitions factory worker, youngest-then British Empire Medal awardee), Reginald Leonard Haine (Victoria Cross awardee), Cecil Arthur Lewis (fighter ace, Military Cross awardee), Philip Neame (Victoria Cross awardee), Keith Officer (an Australian who served with the Australian Imperial Force), Harry Patch (last surviving trench combat soldier of the war), Edward Spears (military liaison English–French translator), Henry Williamson (gassed and medically discharged), and Douglas Wimberley (Military Cross awardee).

The book has subsequently been dramatised for the stage as Forgotten voices by the playwright Malcolm McKay by 2006.
