= Grand Slam (Spinners album) =

Studio album by the Spinners
- Released: September 27, 1982
- Recorded: 1982
- Studio: The Mom & Pops Co. Store, Inc., Studios A & E, Studio City, California, United States
- Genre: Soul
- Length: 41:24
- Language: English
- Label: Atlantic
- Producer: Freddie Perren; Ric Wyatt, Jr. ("Just Let Love In")

The Spinners chronology
Can't Shake This Feeling (1981)	Grand Slam (1982)	Cross Fire (1984)

Grand Slam is a 1982 studio album by American soul music vocal group the Spinners, released on Atlantic Records. This release continued a pattern of critical and commercial decline, with the band barely cracking the Billboard 200 and receiving lukewarm reviews.

== Reception ==
A review in Billboard praised Freddie Perren's production and John Edwards's vocals on Grand Slam. Editors at AllMusic Guide scored Grand Slam two out of five stars, with reviewer Ron Wynn characterizing it as a "too close for comfort" to being a disaster.

== Track listing ==
1. "City Full of Memories" (Freddie Perren and Keni St. Lewis) – 5:41
2. "Magic in the Moonlight" (St. Lewis) – 5:51
3. "If I Knew" (Joe Russo) – 4:27
4. "I'm Calling You Now" (Perren and St. Lewis) – 4:09
5. "So Far Away" (Perren and St. Lewis) – 4:24
6. "Just Let Love In" (Ric Wyatt Jr. and Kris Young) – 3:45
7. "Funny How Time Slips Away" (Willie Nelson) – 3:30
8. "Lover Boy" (Perren and St. Lewis) – 5:15
9. "No Other Love" (Perren and St. Lewis) – 4:22

== Chart performance ==
Grand Slam reached 43 on the R&B chart and peaking at 167 on the Billboard 200. Jet featured the album for three weeks on its Top 20 Albums: debuting at 20 on January 24 and spending two weeks at 16.

== Personnel ==
The Spinners

- John Edwards – vocals, backing vocals, lead vocals on "City Full of Memories", "Magic in the Moonlight", "If I Knew", "So Far Away", "Funny How Time Slips Away", and "Lover Boy"
- Henry Fambrough – vocals, backing vocals, lead vocals on "Just Let Love In"
- Billy Henderson – vocals, backing vocals
- Pervis Jackson – vocals, backing vocals, lead vocals on "No Other Love"
- Bobby Smith – vocals, backing vocals, lead vocals on "I'm Calling You Now"

Additional personnel

- Ed Biggs – engineering
- Pete Bishop – engineering
- George Bohanon – saxophone on "No Other Love"
- Sonny Burke – keyboards on "If I Knew" and "Funny How Time Slips Away"
- Leon "Ndugu" Chancler – drums on "City Full of Memories", "Magic in the Moonlight", "If I Knew", "I'm Calling You Now", "So Far Away", "Funny How Time Slips Away", and "No Other Love"
- Paulinho Da Costa – percussion on "City Full of Memories" and "Lover Boy"
- Charles Davis – trumpet on "No Other Love"
- Bob Defrin – art direction
- Charles Fearing – guitar on "City Full of Memories", "Magic in the Moonlight", "If I Knew", "I'm Calling You Now", "So Far Away", "Funny How Time Slips Away", and "No Other Love"
- James Goforth – technical engineering
- Gary Grant – trumpet on "No Other Love"
- Bill Green – saxophone on "No Other Love"
- Mark Hanauer – photography
- Gary Herbig – saxophone on "No Other Love"
- Jerry Hey – flugelhorn on "No Other Love"; trumpet on "No Other Love"; horn arrangement on "Magic in the Moonlight", "Lover Boy", and "No Other Love"; string arrangement on "Magic in the Moonlight", "Lover Boy", and "No Other Love"
- Karvin Johnson – assistant engineering
- Reggie Kendall – assistant engineering
- Dennis King – mastering at Atlantic Studios, New York City, New York, United States
- Katie Kirkpatrick – harp on "No Other Love"
- Phillip Madayag – drums on "Lover Boy"
- Cornelius Mims – bass guitar on "City Full of Memories", "Magic in the Moonlight", "If I Knew", "I'm Calling You Now", "So Far Away", "Funny How Time Slips Away", and "No Other Love"
- Ollie Mitchell – trumpet on "No Other Love"
- Gene Page – horn arrangement on "City Full of Memories", "If I Knew", "I'm Calling You Now", "So Far Away", and "Funny How Time Slips Away"; string arrangement on "City Full of Memories", "If I Knew", "I'm Calling You Now", "So Far Away", and "Funny How Time Slips Away"
- Freddie Perren – keyboards on "City Full of Memories", "Magic in the Moonlight", "I'm Calling You Now", "So Far Away", "Lover Boy", and "No Other Love"; synthesizer on "Magic in the Moonlight", "I'm Calling You Now", "So Far Away", "Lover Boy", and "No Other Love"; bass synthesizer on "City Full of Memories" and "Lover Boy"; vocoder on "Lover Boy"; rhythm arrangement on "City Full of Memories", "Magic in the Moonlight", "I'm Calling You Now", "So Far Away", "Lover Boy" and "No Other Love"; engineering; production
- James Phillips – synthesizer on "Magic in the Moonlight", vocoder on "Magic in the Moonlight", vocoder programming on "Lover Boy"
- Steve Pouliot – engineering
- Bill Reichenbach Jr. – trombone on "No Other Love", horn arrangement on "Lover Boy", string arrangement on "Lover Boy"
- Pete Robinson – synthesizer on "If I Knew" and "Funny How Time Slips Away"
- Ernie Watts – saxophone on "No Other Love"
- Ric Wyatt Jr. – keyboards on "Just Let Love In", bass synthesizer on "Just Let Love In", harmonica on "Just Let Love In", horn arrangement on "Just Let Love In", synthesizer arrangement on "Just Let Love In", production on "Just Let Love In"

== See also ==
- List of 1982 albums
