= Lovin' Feelings (Spinners album) =

Studio album by The Spinners
- Released: September 23, 1985
- Genre: Soul
- Length: 34:32
- Language: English
- Label: Mirage
- Producer: Chris Barbosa; Harvey Fuqua; Ashley Irwin; Mark Liggett; Gerard McMahon; Maurice Starr

The Spinners chronology
Cross Fire (1984)	Lovin' Feelings (1985)	Down to Business (1989)

Lovin' Feelings is a 1985 studio album by American soul music vocal group The Spinners, released on Mirage Records. The band came to Mirage after a steady commercial and critical decline that lasted for almost a decade and resulted in them leaving long-time label Atlantic Records. However, the band were unable to regain any momentum, with Lovin' Feelings becoming the first Spinners album to not chart.

== Reception ==
Editors at AllMusic Guide scored Lovin' Feelings two out of five stars, with reviewer Ron Wynn writing, "nothing worked from start to finish on this mid-'80s number, both a commercial and artistic flop".

== Track listing ==
1. "Put Us Together Again" (Gerard McMahon) – 3:43
2. "I Found an Angel" (McMahon) – 4:00
3. "You're Number One" (McMahon) – 3:26
4. "She Does" (Ernie Gold and Seth Swirshy) – 4:01
5. "That's What Girls Are Made For" (Gwen Fuqua and Harvey Fuqua) – 3:20
6. "More Today Than Yesterday" (Alwyn Wall and Malcolm Wild) – 3:45
7. "The Witness" (McMahon) – 3:46
8. "Two Can Be One (Theme from Cagney & Lacey)" (lyrics: Ashley Irwin and S. A. Williams, music: Bill Conti) – 4:31
9. "Show Me Your Magic" (Joe Curiale, Rick Neigher, and Leon Ware) – 4:00

== Personnel ==
The Spinners

- John Edwards – vocals, backing vocals
- Henry Fambrough – vocals, backing vocals
- Billy Henderson – vocals, backing vocals
- Pervis Jackson – vocals, backing vocals
- Bobby Smith – vocals, backing vocals

Additional personnel

- Patrick Adams – remixing on "She Does" and "That's What Girls Are Made For"
- Chris Barbosa – production on "More Today Than Yesterday"
- Bob Defrin – art direction
- Jim Delehant – executive production
- Harvey Fuqua – production on "That's What Girls Are Made For"
- Jerry Greenberg – executive production
- Gary Heery – photography
- Ashley Irwin – production on "She Does" and "Two Can Be One (Theme from Cagney & Lacey)"
- Mark Liggett – production on "More Today Than Yesterday"
- Gerard McMahon – production on "Put Us Together Again", "I Found an Angel", "You're My Number One", and "The Witness"
- Joel Soiffer – engineering on "Put Us Together Again", "I Found an Angel", and "You're My Number One"
- Maurice Starr – production on "Show Me Your Magic"

== See also ==
- List of 1985 albums
