= Labor of Love (Spinners album) =

Studio album by the Spinners
- Released: March 9, 1981
- Studio: Sigma Sound (New York City); Media Sound (New York City)
- Genre: Soul
- Length: 39:50
- Language: English
- Label: Atlantic
- Producer: Michael Zager

The Spinners chronology
Love Trippin' (1980)	Labor of Love (1981)	Can't Shake This Feeling (1981)

Labor of Love is a 1981 studio album by American soul music vocal group the Spinners, released on Atlantic Records. This release followed a brief period of disco experimentation. The group returned to their Philly soul roots, giving the band a commercial and critical boost. Still, with this album, the slid to the bottom of sales charts and would fall off entirely within a few years.

== Reception ==
Editors at AllMusic Guide scored Labor of Love three out of five stars, with reviewer Ron Wynn writing that this was when the group's commercial prospects began to slide, as audiences thought of them as a cover band reinterpreting crossover pop/rhythm and blues hits, noting that this album has "ebullient soul ballads and uptempo tunes" that builds upon their classic period, but which left them out of step with contemporary audiences.

== Track listing ==
1. "Long Live Soul Music" (Willie Hutch) – 4:56
2. "Standing on the Rock" (Willie Hutch) – 4:29
3. Medley: "Yesterday Once More" / "Nothing Remains the Same" (John Bettis and Richard Carpenter/Michael Zager) – 7:29
4. "Almost All the Way to Love" (John Lewis Parker and Harry Shannon) – 4:04
5. "The Winter of Our Love" (lyrics: Linda Creed, music: Michael Zager) – 3:49
6. "Be My Love" (lyrics: Sammy Cahn, music: Nicholas Brodsky) – 4:04
7. "Give Your Lady What She Wants" (Tony Wilson) – 3:19
8. "A Man Just Don't Know What a Woman Goes Through" (Bob Brabham, Linda Brown, and Archie P. Jordon) – 3:15
9. "The Deacon" (lyrics: Pervis Jackson, music: Michael Zager) – 4:25

== Chart performance ==
Labor of Love marked a sharp downturn in commercial success from the band's past two albums, reaching 40 on the R&B chart and peaking at 128 on the Billboard 200.

== Personnel ==
The Spinners

- John Edwards – vocals, backing vocals
- Henry Fambrough – vocals, backing vocals
- Billy Henderson – vocals, backing vocals
- Pervis Jackson – vocals, backing vocals
- Bobby Smith – vocals, backing vocals

"Long Live Soul Music"

- Gary Grant – flugelhorn, trumpet
- Jerry Hey – flugelhorn, trumpet
- Willie Hutch – bass guitar, rhythm arrangement
- Kim Hutchcroft – alto saxophone
- Eddie Summers – drums
- Gemi "Master Phonk" Taylor – guitar
- Melvin Webb – percussion
- Larry Williams – tenor saxophone, synthesizer
- Michael Zager – electric piano, rhythm arrangement

"Standing On the Rock"

- Danny Cahn – trumpet
- Ronnie Cuber – baritone saxophone
- Eddie Daniels – alto saxophone
- Lenny Hambro – tenor saxophone
- Willie Hutch – bass guitar, rhythm arrangement
- Robert Millikan – trumpet
- Eddie Summers – drums
- Gemi "Master Phonk" Taylor – guitar
- Melvin Webb – percussion
- Larry Williams – synthesizer
- Michael Zager – electric piano, rhythm arrangement

Medley: "Yesterday Once More" / "Nothing Remains the Same"

- Rubens Bassini – percussion
- Dave Carey – vibraphone
- Danny Cahn – trumpet
- Mike Campbell – guitar
- Francisco Centeno – bass guitar
- Raymond Chew – keyboards
- Raphael Cruz – percussion
- Ronnie Cuber – baritone saxophone
- Eddie Daniels – alto saxophone
- Lenny Hambro – tenor saxophone
- Yogi Horton – drums
- Steve Love – guitar
- Robert Millikan – trumpet
- Cliff Morris – guitar
- Larry Williams – synthesizer

"Almost All the Way to Love"

- Mike Campbell – guitar
- Yogi Horton – drums
- Jimmy Maelen – percussion
- Jolyon Skinner – bass guitar
- Larry Williams – synthesizer
- Michael Zager – keyboards

"The Winter of Our Love"

- Rubens Bassini – percussion
- Raphael Cruz – percussion
- Steve Kahn – guitar
- Will Lee – bass guitar
- Cliff Morris – guitar
- Rob Mounsey – synthesizer
- Chris Parker – drums
- Pat Rebillot – keyboards

"Be My Love"

- Francisco Centeno – bass guitar
- Raymond Chew – keyboards
- Yogi Horton – drums
- Steve Love – guitar
- Cliff Morris – guitar
- Larry Williams – synthesizer

"Give Your Lady What She Wants"

- Mike Campbell – guitar
- Dave Carey – vibraphone
- Raymond Chew – keyboards
- Neil Jason – bass guitar
- Steve Love – guitar
- Jimmy Maelen – percussion
- Cliff Morris – guitar
- Rob Mounsey – synthesizer
- Allan Schwartzberg – drums

"A Man Just Don't Know What a Woman Goes Through"

- Raymond Chew – keyboards
- Neil Jason – bass guitar
- Steve Love – guitar
- Jimmy Maelen – percussion
- Cliff Morris – guitar
- Rob Mounsey – synthesizer
- Allan Schwartzberg – drums

"The Deacon"

- Gary Grant – flugelhorn, trumpet
- Jerry Hey – flugelhorn, trumpet
- Willie Hutch – bass guitar
- Kim Hutchcroft – alto saxophone
- Eddie Summers – drums
- Gemi "Master Phonk" Taylor – guitar
- Melvin Webb – percussion
- Larry Williams – synthesizer, tenor saxophone
- Michael Zager – electric piano

Technical personnel

- Carla Bandini – mixing assistance, engineering on rhythm tracks for "Be My Love", "A Man Just Don't Know What a Woman Goes Through", "The Deacon" Rhythm Tracks at Sigma Sound Studios, New York City, New York, United States
- Mike Barbiero – engineering on rhythm tracks for Medley: "Yesterday Once More" / "Nothing Remains the Same", "Almost All the Way to Love", "Give Your Lady What She Wants" at Media Sound, New York City, New York, United States
- Ed Barton – engineering on rhythm tracks for "Long Live Soul Music", "Standing on the Rock", and "The Winter of Our Love" at Sunset Sound, Los Angeles, California, United States
- Lincoln Calpp – engineering assistance on rhythm tracks for Medley: "Yesterday Once More" / "Nothing Remains the Same", "Almost All the Way to Love", "Give Your Lady What She Wants" at Media Sound, New York City, New York, United States
- Dennis King – mastering at Atlantic Studios, New York City, New York, United States
- Michael Hutchinson – engineering, recording, and mixing at Sigma Sound Studios, New York City, New York, United States (including horns for "Standing on the Rock", Medley: "Yesterday Once More" / "Nothing Remains the Same", "Be My Love", "A Man Just Don't Know What a Woman Goes Through", and "The Deacon")
- David Leonard – engineering on rhythm tracks for "Long Live Soul Music", "Standing on the Rock", and "The Winter of Our Love" at Sunset Sound, Los Angeles, California, United States
- Jerry Love – executive production
- Greg Mann – engineering assistance on rhythm tracks for Medley: "Yesterday Once More" / "Nothing Remains the Same", "Almost All the Way to Love", "Give Your Lady What She Wants" at Media Sound, New York City, New York, United States
- John Potoker – engineering on rhythm tracks for "Be My Love", "A Man Just Don't Know What a Woman Goes Through", "The Deacon" Rhythm Tracks at Sigma Sound Studios, New York City, New York, United States
- Matthew Weiner – mixing assistance at Sigma Sound Studios, New York City, New York, United States
- Kim Whitesides – illustration
- Sandy Young – art direction
- Michael Zager – arrangement, conducting, production

== See also ==
- List of 1981 albums
