= Forgotten Voices of the Holocaust =

2006 book by Lyn Smith

- Author: Lyn Smith
- Series: Forgotten Voices
- Subject: History
- Genre: Non-fiction
- Published: 2006 (Ebury Press)
- Publication place: United Kingdom
- ISBN: 978-0-09-191093-8
- Preceded by: Forgotten Voices of the Second World War
- Followed by: Forgotten Voices of the Secret War

Forgotten Voices of the Holocaust is a collection of interviews with victims of the Holocaust as well as people who collaborated with or worked directly for the Nazi regime. The Imperial War Museum commissioned Lyn Smith to work with them on their sound archive. The interviews she brought together are now part of their permanent Holocaust exhibit as well as being set down in this book from Ebury Press.

The book is written by Smith, who puts the interviews into chronological order and gives context to the events surrounding them. It also features a foreword by Laurence Rees.
