= Down to Business =

Studio album by The Spinners
- Released: August 18, 1989
- Recorded: Early 1989
- Studio: Fantasy Studios, Berkeley, California, United States
- Genre: Soul
- Length: 44:37
- Language: English
- Label: Volt
- Producer: Allen Burke; Kent Brown; James Early; Jaee Logan; Randie McBride; F. L. Pittman; Claytoven Richardson

The Spinners chronology
Lovin' Feelings (1985)	Down to Business (1989)	One of a Kind Love Affair: The Anthology (1991)

Down to Business is a 1989 studio album by American soul music vocal group The Spinners, released on Volt Records. This album came after the band had been dropped from long-time label Atlantic Records and had a one-album detour via Mirage Records with Lovin' Feelings in 1985. While Down to Business charted, it was considered a commercial and critical flop.

It did return the band to the R&B chart for the first time in five years with the single "Heal Me", though the track never made it beyond number 70.

== Reception ==
Editors at AllMusic Guide scored Down to Business three out of five stars, with critic Ron Wynn "some excellent harmonizing and fine, soulful leads from John Edwards".

== Track listing ==
1. "I'm Happy Baby" (Barry Callier, Larry Coney, and F. L. Pittman) – 4:23
2. "We Got Businees" (John Bettis, Jay Graydon, and Richard Page) – 4:45
3. "Heal Me" (Claytoven Richardson) – 5:55
4. "So Hard to Let You Go" (Pittman) – 4:40
5. "I Wanna Love You Forever" (Kent Brown, Callier, and Pittman) – 4:52
6. "My Lady Is My Best Friend" (Pervis Jackson and Tony Williams) – 3:53
7. "We Dance to Love Songs" (Douglas Getschall and Randy Waldman) – 4:12
8. "Can I Depend on You" (Susan Aladdin and Jody Sims) – 4:34
9. "Memories of Allison" (Craig Chetkovich-Bryant) – 3:53
10. "Time Can Do Magic" (Cynthia Bythell) – 3:31

Compact disc editions feature the final two tracks and the vinyl LP omits them.

== Chart performance ==
Down to Business reached 82 on the R&B chart and did not land on the Billboard 200.

== Personnel ==
The Spinners

- John Edwards – vocals, backing vocals
- Henry Fambrough – vocals; backing vocals
- Billy Henderson – vocals, backing vocals
- Pervis Jackson – vocals, backing vocals
- Bobby Smith – vocals, backing vocals

Additional personnel

- Larry Batiste – arrangement on "My Lady Is My Best Friend"
- Phil Bray – photography
- Edgar J. Brincat – production assistance
- Allen Burke – co-production on "Memories of Allison", vocal coordination
- Kent Brown – arrangement on "I Wanna Love You Forever", "We Dance to Love Songs", and "Can I Depend On You"; pre-production on "Time Can Do Magic"
- Phil Carroll – art direction
- Gary Coleman – arrangement on "We Got Business"
- Emilio Conesa – guitar
- Owen Davis – percussion
- James Early – arrangement on "We Got Business", production on "We Got Business"
- Stephen Hart – mixing on "I'm Happy Baby", "So Hard to Let You Go", "My Lady Is My Best Friend", "We Dance to Love Songs", and "Can I Depend On You"
- Lee Hildebrand – liner notes
- George Horn – mastering
- Jaee Logan – arrangement on "I'm Happy Baby", production on "I'm Happy Baby"
- Dave Luke – recording, mixing on "We Got Business" and "Heal Me"
- Melisio Magdaluyo – saxophone
- Gilles Margerin – design
- Randie McBride – pre-production on "We Dance to Love Songs"
- Feldon Pilate – arrangement on "So Hard to Let You Go"
- F. L. Pittman – production
- Claytoven Richardson – arrangement on "Heal Me", production on "Heal Me"
- Bob Ross – arrangement on "We Dance to Love Songs", "Can I Depend On You", and "Time Can Do Magic"
- Michael Semanick – engineering assistance on "Can I Depend On You"
- Tom Size – mixing on "I Wanna Love You Forever"

== See also ==
- List of 1989 albums
