= Forgotten Voices of the Blitz and the Battle of Britain =

- Author: Joshua Levine
- Series: Forgotten Voices
- Subject: History
- Genre: Non-fiction
- Published: 2006 (Ebury Press)
- Publication place: United Kingdom
- ISBN: 978-0-09-191450-9
- Preceded by: Forgotten Voices of the Great War
- Followed by: Forgotten Voices of the Second World War

Forgotten Voices of the Blitz and the Battle of Britain uses material from Imperial War Museum’s sound archive. It was written by Joshua Levine to bring together interviews with people who lived through the Blitz and the Battle of Britain. It features interviews with soldiers, airmen, fire-fighters, air-raid wardens and civilians, people in the air and on the ground.
