= Can't Shake This Feeling (Spinners album) =

Studio album by The Spinners
- Released: November 9, 1981
- Recorded: 1981
- Studio: Sigma Sound Studios, New York City, New York, United States
- Genre: Soul
- Length: 38:23
- Language: English
- Label: Atlantic
- Producer: Reggie Lucas; James Mtume

The Spinners chronology
Labor of Love (1981)	Can't Shake This Feeling (1981)	Grand Slam (1982)

Can't Shake This Feeling is a 1981 studio album by American soul music vocal group the Spinners, released on Atlantic Records. It continued a pattern of critical and commercial decline, with the band barely cracking the Billboard 200 and receiving lukewarm reviews.

== Reception ==
Editors at AllMusic Guide scored Can't Shake This Feeling 2.5 out of five stars, with reviewer Ron Wynn characterizing it as a "collection of half-hearted tracks, disjointed production, and leaden arrangements".

== Track listing ==
1. "Can't Shake This Feelin'" (Reggie Lucas and James Mtume) – 3:52
2. "Knack for Me" (Paul Lawrence Jones) – 5:42
3. "You Go Your Way (I'll Go Mine)" (Tawatha) – 3:36
4. "Love Connection (Raise the Window Down)" (Lucas and Mtume) – 5:36
5. "Never Thought I'd Fall in Love" (Dean Gant) – 3:50
6. "Didn't I Blow Your Mind" (Thom Bell and William Hart) – 3:54
7. "Send a Little Love" (David Bryant, Tony Haynes, and Al McKay) – 3:29
8. "Love Is Such a Crazy Feeling" (Gant) – 3:16
9. "Got to Be Love" (Lucas and Mtume) – 5:08

== Chart performance ==
Labor of Love was the weakest performing album in the group's history, reaching 34 on the R&B chart and peaking at 196 on the Billboard 200.

== Personnel ==
The Spinners

- John Edwards – lead tenor/baritone vocals, backing vocals
- Henry Fambrough –baritone vocals, backing vocals
- Billy Henderson – second tenor/baritone vocals, backing vocals
- Pervis Jackson – bass vocals, backing vocals
- Bobby Smith – co-lead tenor vocals, backing vocals

Additional musicians

- Bashiri – percussion
- Raymond Calhoun – drums
- Hubert Eaves – keyboards
- Basil Fearrington – bass guitar
- Dean Gant – keyboards, rhythm arrangement on "Never Thought I'd Fall in Love" and "Love Is Such a Crazy Feeling"
- Howard King – drums
- Reggie Lucas – guitar; rhythm arrangement on "Can't Shake This Feelin'", "Love Connection (Raise the Window Down)", and "Got to Be Love"; production
- Ullanda McCullough – backing vocals
- Marcus Miller – bass guitar
- Leslie Ming – drums
- Ed "Tree" Moore – guitar; rhythm arrangement on "You Go Your Way (I'll Go Mine)" and "Didn't I Blow Your Mind"
- James Mtume – keyboards; rhythm arrangement on "Can't Shake This Feelin'", "Love Connection (Raise the Window Down)", and "Got to Be Love"; production
- Tawatha – backing vocals
- Luther Vandross – backing vocals
- Ed Walsh – synthesizer
- Bernie Worrell – synthesizer
- Norma Jean Wright – backing vocals

Technical personnel

- Carla Bandini – additional engineering
- Gerry Block – additional engineering, mixing
- John Convertino – assistant engineering
- Jim "Doc" Dougherty – chief engineering, mixing
- Michael Halsband – photography
- Ted Jensen – mastering at Sterling Sound
- Howard King – rhythm arrangement on "You Go Your Way (I'll Go Mine)" and "Didn't I Blow Your Mind"
- Paul Lawerence Jones – rhythm arrangement on "Knack for Me"
- Al McKay – rhythm arrangement on "Send a Little Love"
- Craig Michaels – assistant engineering
- Dunn Pearson – horn and string arrangement on "Can't Shake This Feelin'", "Knack for Me", "You Go Your Way (I'll Go Mine)", "Didn't I Blow Your Mind", "Send a Little Love", "Love Is Such a Crazy Feeling", and "Got to Be Love", string arrangement on "Never Thought I'd Fall in Love"
- John Potoker – additional engineering
- Greg Thomas – horn arrangement on "Love Connection (Raise the Window Down)" and "Never Thought I'd Fall in Love"
- Matthew Weiner – additional engineering assistance
- Harry Whitaker – keyboards
- Sandi Young – art direction

== See also ==
- List of 1981 albums
