= King Palmer =

English composer, conductor, author and teacher (1913 – 1999)

Cedric King Palmer (13 February 1913 – 13 July 1999) was an English composer, conductor, author and teacher, best known for his popular educational books on music and as a prolific composer of orchestral library music.

== Biography ==
Born in Eastbourne, East Sussex, the son of an architect, Cedric King Palmer was educated at Tonbridge School and studied conducting and composition at the Royal Academy of Music. His teachers there included Ernest Read and Benjamin Dale (conducting) and William Alwyn and Norman Demuth (composition). While still a student conductor, Palmer was asked in 1932 to conduct at the Queen's Hall by Sir Henry Wood. After graduating in 1933 he began taking in students for singing lessons and offering correspondence courses in music theory. He also took on the role of conductor at the Sevenoaks Musical Society, which performed Elgar's cantata King Olaf in 1934 under his baton.

By 1937, Palmer had written his first stage show, Gay Romance (book and lyrics by Cossar Turfery) from which one song, "The Man For Me" gained a measure of separate popularity. He also wrote With Pomp and Pride, a march to celebrate the coronation of King George VI in 1937. The outbreak of war disrupted his theatre music career, but he did conduct a revival of The Desert Song in January 1943 at the Prince of Wales Theatre in London, and later a revival of Victor Herbert's operetta Naughty Marietta in which his future wife, Winifred Henry, was singing. They married in 1947.

Meanwhile, in 1944 Palmer had published Teach Yourself Music, part of the extensive English University Press Teach Yourself series in their distinctive black and yellow jackets, with subjects ranging from salesmanship to jet-engines and rocket propulsion. Attempting such a broad subject in less than 200 pages was obviously a daunting task. The (anonymous) Musical Times reviewer stated that "whatever else you may teach yourself, it cannot be done with music" and expressed "a good deal of sympathy for a writer who was, as he doubtless well knew, up against it". Teach Yourself to Compose Music, more narrowly focused on harmony, form and counterpoint as well as genres, followed in 1948. Teach Yourself to Play the Piano was published in 1957. The books lay out classical best practices clearly and simply, but ignore more modern developments altogether. Reviewing Teach Yourself Orchestration (1964) Geoffrey Bush pointed out that "Webern might never have existed". His other books included The Musical Production – a complete guide for amateurs (with Cossar Turfery, 1953), and The ABC of Church Music (with Stephen Rhys, 1967).

== Conducting and Composition ==
From the late 1940s Palmer was building up both his conducting and composition activities. The King Palmer Light Orchestra regularly broadcast on the BBC Home Service and Light Programme between 1948 and 1956. Always a champion of amateur music making, Palmer also conducted the City Literary Institute Rehearsal Orchestra, formed in November 1949 by professional musicians working in various restaurants and theatres to play through the standard symphonic repertoire. Advanced amateurs were also recruited. Palmer also lectured on music at City Lit. His orchestral conducting provided a platform for arrangements - such as Galopade (a medley of galops and cancans), Foster Memories (selection of Stephen Foster songs), Suppé On Parade (selection of Suppé marches), and Waltzing Through the Years (selection of waltzes, 1951) - but also for original compositions. And an engagement by the Ford Motor Company for his orchestra to play at the Ford Motor Show in 1946 (held at the Royal Albert Hall) was his first introduction to the potential of commercial music. Palmer composed Rhythm of the Road, with lyrics by Cossar Turfey, which Ford used as the basis for a promotional film, in which the composer can be seen conducting.

Following on from this he built up a new career in production and library music, composing over 600 mood music pieces for music library companies such as W. Paxton and Co and KPM. Many of these pieces were short snippets composed to evoke a specific mood for radio, television and films. Many were used multiple times and have become familiar while remaining anonymous, because they are mostly used uncredited. Examples include Hackney Carriage (memorably used by Oliver Stone in his 1995 film Nixon), Toboggan Ride, Holiday Playtime and Jogging Along. Occasionally, a piece would be chosen for a series theme tune and become more widely known, such as the theme for the 1962 US medical drama TV series The Eleventh Hour.

Aside from library music, Palmer wrote a series of orchestral suites and shorter light music movements, some plays with music and pantomimes for children, and the occasional work with more serious intentions – notably the Three Atonal Studies for piano. He collaborated with his wife Winifred on a new musical, The Snow Queen, in 1967, with music adapted from Grieg. By the end of the 1960s Palmer had stopped composing, but usage of his library music continued to grow. It is still in use today in series such as the Nickelodeon animated series The Ren and Stimpy Show and SpongeBob SquarePants, Much of the music has also been repackaged in a set of library music CDs now available to the general music buyer for the first time.

== Personal life ==
King Palmer married Winifred Henry in 1947 and they had one son (Roger Lindsay, b 1948) and one daughter (Jane Hetherington, b 1952). For a while the couple set up and managed an arts bookshop in Kensington, where they were living. But by 1957 they had moved to Clovelly Lodge, Popes Grove in Twickenham. Winifred died in 1973, after which King Palmer continued as a piano teacher, but also took training as a music therapist, working with patients in local hospitals and prisons. He also served as a magistrate in Richmond. King Palmer kept a series of dogs, all named Nimrod (after the Elgar variation).

== Books ==
- Your Music and You (1938)
- Teach Yourself Music (EUP, 1944 – four editions, the last in 1978)
- Paxton Miniature Biographies series: Bantock; Bach; Beethoven; Handel (1947-8)
- Teach Yourself to Compose Music (1948, 2nd Edition 1973)
- Play the Piano with King Palmer, Paxton (1950)
- The Musical Production (by Cossar Turfery, King Palmer, 1953)
- Teach Yourself to Play the Piano (1957 – 2nd Edition 1982).
- Teach Yourself Orchestration (1964)
- The ABC of Church Music (by Stephen Rhys and King Palmer, 1967)

== Selected works ==
Stage Shows: Romany Moon; The Night is Young; Gay Romance (1937); Hop o' my Thumb (1958); Two Weeks to Californiay (1962) (with his wife Winifred); Aladdin (1965); Coalblack and the Seven Giants (1965); The Snow Queen (1967) (music adapted from Grieg)

Orchestral: With Pomp and Pride (ceremonial march, 1937); March of the Astronauts, Kingsway March;Springtime (intermezzi); Down a Country Lane (suite); Out of Doors (suite); Eight Period Pieces (suite); Studies in Motion (suite); Studies in Happiness (suite); Fairy Cobweb (1950); Pull Up Your Socks (1960)

Library music/genre pieces: Blue Days at Sea, Busy Life, Country Market, Enchantment, Feather on the Breeze, Frivolity, Gala, Golden Harvest, Going Concern, Hackney Carriage, Jogging Along, Paddle Steamer, Paul Pry, Procession, Softly She Sleeps, Spindlelegs, Stormy Passage, Tomorrow the World

Film and television music: Dark Eyes of London (1939), Rhythm of the Road (1946); The Eleventh Hour (1962); Cockney Kids' Adventure.
