= Dunkirk (2017 film) =

2017 film by Christopher Nolan

- Theatrical release poster
- Directed by: Christopher Nolan
- Written by: Christopher Nolan
- Produced by: Emma Thomas; Christopher Nolan
- Starring: Fionn Whitehead; Tom Glynn-Carney; Jack Lowden; Harry Styles; Aneurin Barnard; James D'Arcy; Barry Keoghan; Kenneth Branagh; Cillian Murphy; Mark Rylance; Tom Hardy
- Cinematography: Hoyte van Hoytema
- Edited by: Lee Smith
- Music by: Hans Zimmer
- Production companies: Syncopy; RatPac-Dune Entertainment
- Distributed by: Warner Bros. Pictures
- Release dates: 13 July 2017 (Odeon Leicester Square); 21 July 2017 (United Kingdom and United States)
- Running time: 106 minutes
- Countries: United Kingdom; United States
- Language: English
- Budget: $100–150 million (Note: The Netherlands Film Fund reported a budget of $120 million in May 2017. That July, it was estimated to be as high as $150 million, with sources at Warner Bros. describing that figure as too high. Later estimates reported a net production budget of $100 million or just below that. In February 2018, producer Emma Thomas said it was made for half the budget as that of Interstellar—$165 million.)
- Box office: $549.9 million

Dunkirk is a 2017 war film produced, written, and directed by Christopher Nolan that depicts the Dunkirk evacuation of World War II from the perspectives of people on the land, sea, and air. It features an ensemble cast including Fionn Whitehead, Tom Glynn-Carney, Jack Lowden, Harry Styles in his feature film debut, Aneurin Barnard, James D'Arcy, Barry Keoghan, Kenneth Branagh, Cillian Murphy, Mark Rylance, and Tom Hardy.

The film portrays the evacuation with little dialogue, as Nolan sought instead to create suspense through cinematography and music. Filming began in May 2016 in Dunkirk and wrapped that September in Los Angeles, when post-production began. Cinematographer Hoyte van Hoytema shot the film on IMAX 65 mm and 65 mm large-format film stock. Dunkirk has extensive practical effects. It employed thousands of extras as well as historic boats from the evacuation, and period aeroplanes.

Distributed by Warner Bros. Pictures, Dunkirk premiered at Odeon Leicester Square in London, a few days before its release in the United Kingdom and United States on 21 July 2017. It grossed over $530 million worldwide, making it the highest-grossing World War II film until it was surpassed by Nolan's Oppenheimer (2023). Dunkirk received praise for its screenplay, direction, editing, score, sound design and cinematography; some critics called it Nolan's best work, and one of the greatest war films as well as one of the greatest movies of the 2010s. It received various accolades, including eight nominations at the 90th Academy Awards, including Best Picture and Best Director. (Note: This marked Nolan's first nomination for Best Director at the Academy Awards.) It went on to win for Best Sound Editing, Best Sound Mixing, and Best Film Editing.

== Plot ==
While the film is shown in a nonlinear narrative, including the action of one week on the beach, one day in the rescue flotilla, and one hour of the air battle, the following is the chronological order of events that happen in the film.

In the summer of 1940, during the Battle of France, Allied soldiers retreat to Dunkirk. A British soldier named Tommy loses his squadmates and flees through the perimeter held by French troops to the beach, where thousands await evacuation. He helps another soldier, Gibson, bury a body and survive a Luftwaffe dive-bomber attack. They rush a wounded man on a stretcher onto a hospital ship at the single, vulnerable mole, overseen by Commander Bolton, available for embarking on deep-draft ships, but are ordered off again. Together, they hide underneath the pier in hopes of sneaking back on, but the ship is sunk by German aircraft.

Tommy saves a Highlander, Alex, from being crushed by the wreck of the sinking ship. Tommy and Gibson submerse themselves underwater and masquerade as some of the boat’s survivors in order to be let onto the next available ship. That night, the three board a destroyer, but it is hit by a U-boat torpedo before it can depart. Gibson saves Tommy and Alex while escaping the sinking ship by opening the door to below-deck, and they all return to the beach.

The Royal Navy requisitions civilian vessels in England for the evacuation. In Weymouth, civilian sailor Dawson and his son Peter set out in his boat Moonstone, rather than let the Navy commandeer her. Their teenage hand George joins them on impulse. In the English Channel, they save an officer, now shell-shocked after surviving a U-boat sinking. Realising Dawson is going to Dunkirk, the officer grows fearful and Peter locks him up. He escapes, urging they turn back, and tries to wrest control of the boat; in the scuffle, he elbows George, who falls down a staircase and suffers a severe head injury.

Three Royal Air Force (RAF) Spitfires fly towards Dunkirk to provide cover for the evacuation, limited to one hour of operation by their fuel supply. They engage in a dogfight with a Messerschmitt Bf 109. After shooting it down, one of the pilots, Farrier, has his fuel gauge smashed and cannot read how much he has left. He and the second Spitfire pilot, Collins, determine their leader has gone down and fly on with Collins radioing Farrier about their remaining fuel. The crew of the Moonstone witness the two RAF pilots protect a minesweeper from a bomber escorted by fighters: Collins's Spitfire is hit and he ditches. Initially trapped in his canopy as the plane sinks, Collins is saved by Peter.

Becoming increasingly desperate, Tommy, Alex and Gibson join Highlanders in a grounded trawler in the intertidal zone outside the perimeter, hoping the tide will float them home. After its Dutch sailor returns, Germans start shooting at the boat, and water enters through the bullet holes.

Alex, attempting to lighten the craft to keep it afloat, accuses Gibson (who has been silent the entire time) of being a German spy despite Tommy's defences and pleas. He turns the rest of the soldiers against Gibson, using the logic that he must either speak German, or can only speak English with a very thick German accent. Scared for his life, Gibson reveals he is actually French, meaning that he took on the identity of the buried soldier in hopes of being evacuated earlier.

During the scuffle to try to force Gibson out, all the soldiers are thrown to one side, which dislodges the ship and allows the tide to finally lift the trawler. The group has to eventually abandon the boat, as they cannot stop the intruding water after taking more hits. As they leave, Gibson is entangled by a chain, and drowns with the sinking ship.

Farrier, knowing his fuel is running out, decides to keep flying to chase down German aircraft. He engages a German bomber attacking a destroyer. The ship is bombed and sinks, but Farrier is able to down the plane before it can attack the escaping crew. The crashing plane ignites the oil on the water, but members of the crew, as well as Tommy and Alex, are saved by Moonstone, which had manoeuvred to save the men in the water.

Alex points out to Peter that George has already died of his injuries when they are all asked to be careful below-deck. Shortly after, the shell-shocked officer asks Peter if he will be okay, to which he lies and assures him that he will be alright. Dawson has Moonstone evade an aerial attack using a technique taught by his deceased elder son, a pilot lost at the start of the war.

Farrier reaches Dunkirk just as his fuel runs out, shooting down a dive-bomber approaching the mole to the jubilation of the soldiers below.

Once Moonstone makes landfall, the shell-shocked officer and Collins part ways with the Dawsons, as Peter honours George's desire to do something useful enough to be mentioned in the paper by arranging a publication of his obituary. At the same time, Tommy and Alex board a train with the other evacuees.

With over 300,000 men successfully evacuated, Bolton chooses to stay and oversee the French evacuation next.

Upon reaching England, Alex requests a newspaper from a young boy at the train tracks. He cannot bear to read it, fearful that they will be spit at in the streets for failing. Instead, they are actually heralded by the public upon their arrival at Woking.

Farrier glides safely onto the beach; however, he is far beyond the perimeter. After destroying the Spitfire to prevent it from falling into enemy hands, he is captured by German forces.

Tommy reads the paper for Alex, which is quoting Churchill's address to Parliament, pledging that Britain will fight on.

== Cast ==
- Fionn Whitehead as Tommy
- Tom Glynn-Carney as Peter Dawson
- Jack Lowden as Collins (Fortis 2)
- Harry Styles as Alex
- Aneurin Barnard as Gibson
- James D'Arcy as Colonel Winnant
- Barry Keoghan as George Mills
- Kenneth Branagh as Commander Bolton
- Cillian Murphy as Shivering Soldier
- Mark Rylance as Mr Dawson
- Tom Hardy as Farrier (Fortis 1)
- Michael Caine as Fortis Leader (voice) [uncredited]
- Elliott Tittensor as Highlander 2
- Will Attenborough as Second Lieutenant
- Matthew Marsh as Rear Admiral

Additionally Luke Thompson appears as a warrant officer who tells a group of French soldiers they are not allowed on the ship. Harry Collett also appears as a minor unnamed child character.

== Production ==
=== Development ===
The empathy for the characters has nothing to do with their story. I did not want to go through the dialogue, tell the story of my characters ... The problem is not who they are, who they pretend to be or where they come from. The only question I was interested in was: Will they get out of it? Will they be killed by the next bomb while trying to join the mole? Or will they be crushed by a boat while crossing?

— Christopher Nolan

Director Christopher Nolan conceived the film in the mid-1990s, when he and his future wife Emma Thomas sailed across the English Channel, following the path of many small boats in World War II's Dunkirk evacuation. Nolan considered improvising the entire film instead of writing a script, but Thomas convinced him otherwise. In 2015, Nolan wrote a 76-page screenplay, which was about half the length of his usual scripts and his shortest to date. Its precise structure necessitated fictional characters, rather than ones based on eyewitnesses.

The story is told from three perspectives—land (one week of action), sea (one day of action) and air (one hour of action). Nolan structured the film from the point of view of the characters, intending to use visuals rather than dialogue and backstory. He wanted to incorporate throughout the film what he calls his "snowballing effect," where several seemingly disparate storylines connect, that he had previously used only in the third acts of his other films. Nolan said that he approached research as though it were for a documentary, and was attracted to the subject matter because of its inversion of the "Hollywood formula", depicting a military retreat centered on the Franco-British forces in place of the typical heroic narrative of victorious Americans.

Nolan postponed Dunkirk until he had acquired sufficient experience directing large-scale action films. To convey the perspective of soldiers on the beach, for whom contact with the enemy was "extremely limited and intermittent", he did not show Germans on screen (several Germans who take Farrier prisoner are out of focus). He omitted scenes with Winston Churchill and generals in war rooms, as he did not want to get "bogged down in the politics of the situation". Nolan showed key members of the crew eleven films that had inspired him: All Quiet on the Western Front (1930), The Wages of Fear (1953), Alien (1979), Speed (1994), Unstoppable (2010), Greed (1924), Sunrise (1927), Ryan's Daughter (1970), The Battle of Algiers (1966), Chariots of Fire (1981) and Foreign Correspondent (1940)—only two of which are war films. Other film influences include A Man Escaped (1956), Pickpocket (1959), and Saving Private Ryan (1998). The historical consultant was author Joshua Levine, who also wrote the book adaptation, Dunkirk: The History Behind the Major Motion Picture. Levine accompanied Nolan while interviewing veterans. During these interviews, Nolan was told a story of soldiers seen walking into the sea in desperation, which he incorporated into the screenplay.

The production team and scouting locations were chosen before Nolan and Thomas solicited Warner Bros. Pictures to make the film. Nolan and his production designer Nathan Crowley toured the beach of Dunkirk while location scouting, and decided to film there despite the logistical challenges, discarding Suffolk as an alternative. Crowley set up a makeshift art department in Nolan's old garage, as is tradition, and colourised black-and-white photographs to better understand the visual representation. The design aesthetic was made to look as contemporary as possible. Hoyte van Hoytema, who had previously collaborated with Nolan on Interstellar, was chosen as the director of photography. The Hollywood Reporter stated that Nolan made a deal with Warner Bros. to receive a $20 million salary plus 20% of the box office gross; however, Vanity Fair reported that Nolan agreed to a low upfront salary in exchange for a large backend percentage.

Pre-production began in January 2016. For the uniforms, costume designer Jeffrey Kurland aimed to balance historical accuracy with aesthetics that would favour the film stock. As the original heavy wool fabric had not been produced since 1940, it was made from scratch, tailored for the main cast and over a thousand extras. Uniforms were made in a factory in Pakistan and the boots by a shoemaker in Mexico. The costume department then spent three weeks ageing them at Longcross Studios. Each garment was made to look distinct in regiment and personality: Tommy wears a large greatcoat, while Alex dons the Highlander cut. Kurland found references at museums, in contemporary magazines, photo archives and books. The mole was rebuilt over four months from the original blueprints. (Note: The construction came at a cost of $900,000.) Sand was brought from Dunkirk to create make-up consistent with the environment. Oil and tar were specially made and prosthetics were water and fire resistant.

=== Casting ===
After first-hand accounts of the evacuation revealed how young and inexperienced the soldiers had been, Nolan decided to cast young and unknown actors for the beach setting. He was also adamant that all of the cast be British. (Note: Barry Keoghan and Cillian Murphy, however, are Irish.) John Papsidera and Toby Whale were the casting directors for Dunkirk. Tom Hardy, Kenneth Branagh and Mark Rylance were in talks to join the ensemble as supporting characters in late 2015. Fionn Whitehead was cast as the lead in March 2016, while Jack Lowden, Aneurin Barnard and Harry Styles were added shortly after. Cillian Murphy joined the following month. James D'Arcy, Barry Keoghan and Tom Glynn-Carney were included later that May.

Michael Caine had a voice cameo role as Fortis Leader, as a nod to his role in the film Battle of Britain (1969). According to D'Arcy and Nolan, Winnant and Bolton act as a Greek chorus to give the audience context. Whitehead went through a secretive auditioning process lasting several months. His character was named after the slang term for the ordinary British soldier. Styles was cast for his "old fashioned face", as stated by Nolan. He won the role after auditioning against hundreds of candidates, when Nolan was unaware of his renown as a singer. Murphy spoke to Nolan and read about the psychological trauma the soldiers endured, to understand his character's PTSD. Nolan chose Rylance for his work in the theatre and performance in Wolf Hall. As research, Rylance piloted his character's boat every day, listened to audio recordings at the Imperial War Museum, and read accounts of men like Mr Dawson. Between takes, he encouraged rehearsal through improvised scenes. The principal cast members did their own stunts. John Nolan, uncle of Christopher, played Blind Man. Will Attenborough played the Second Lieutenant who orders Tommy and Gibson off the hospital ship.

=== Filming ===
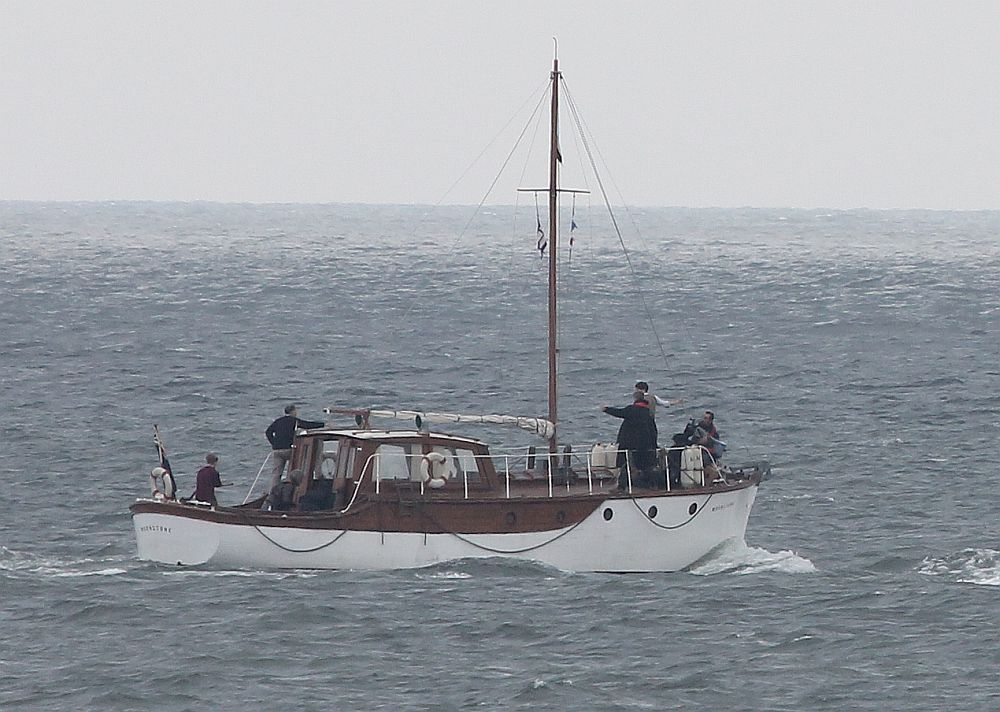
Moonstone during filming with Nolan, Rylance, Glynn-Carney and Keoghan on board

Principal photography commenced on 23 May 2016 in Dunkirk, planned so as to avoid Bastille Day and coincide with the dates of the real evacuation. (Note: Dunkirk was approved under the French international tax rebate scheme.) Production continued for four weeks in Urk, Netherlands, (Note: The film received $1.2 million through the Netherlands' rebate incentive programme.) one week in Swanage and Weymouth in Dorset, United Kingdom, and for two weeks at the Point Vicente Interpretive Center and Lighthouse in Rancho Palos Verdes, California, United States. (Note: In the course of shooting, Dunkirk operated under the working title "Bodega Bay", a place in Northern California suggested by production designer Nathan Crowley.)

Filming in Dunkirk took place at the location of the real evacuation, while the street scenes were shot in nearby Malo-les-Bains because most of the buildings in Dunkirk were destroyed in the war. Shooting times on the beach and mole were determined by tidal patterns. French labour strikes and regulations also affected the schedule.

To minimise the need for computer-generated imagery (CGI), cardboard cut-out props of soldiers and military vehicles created the illusion of a large army. Real or scale-model fighter aircraft, and real warships and private boats, provided realism that could not be achieved from CGI. Scale models were created via 3D printing. The mole set was frequently rebuilt after being damaged by bad weather. Because French authorities had prohibited pyrotechnic charges to protect marine life, air cannons were used instead. Six thousand extras were needed in France.

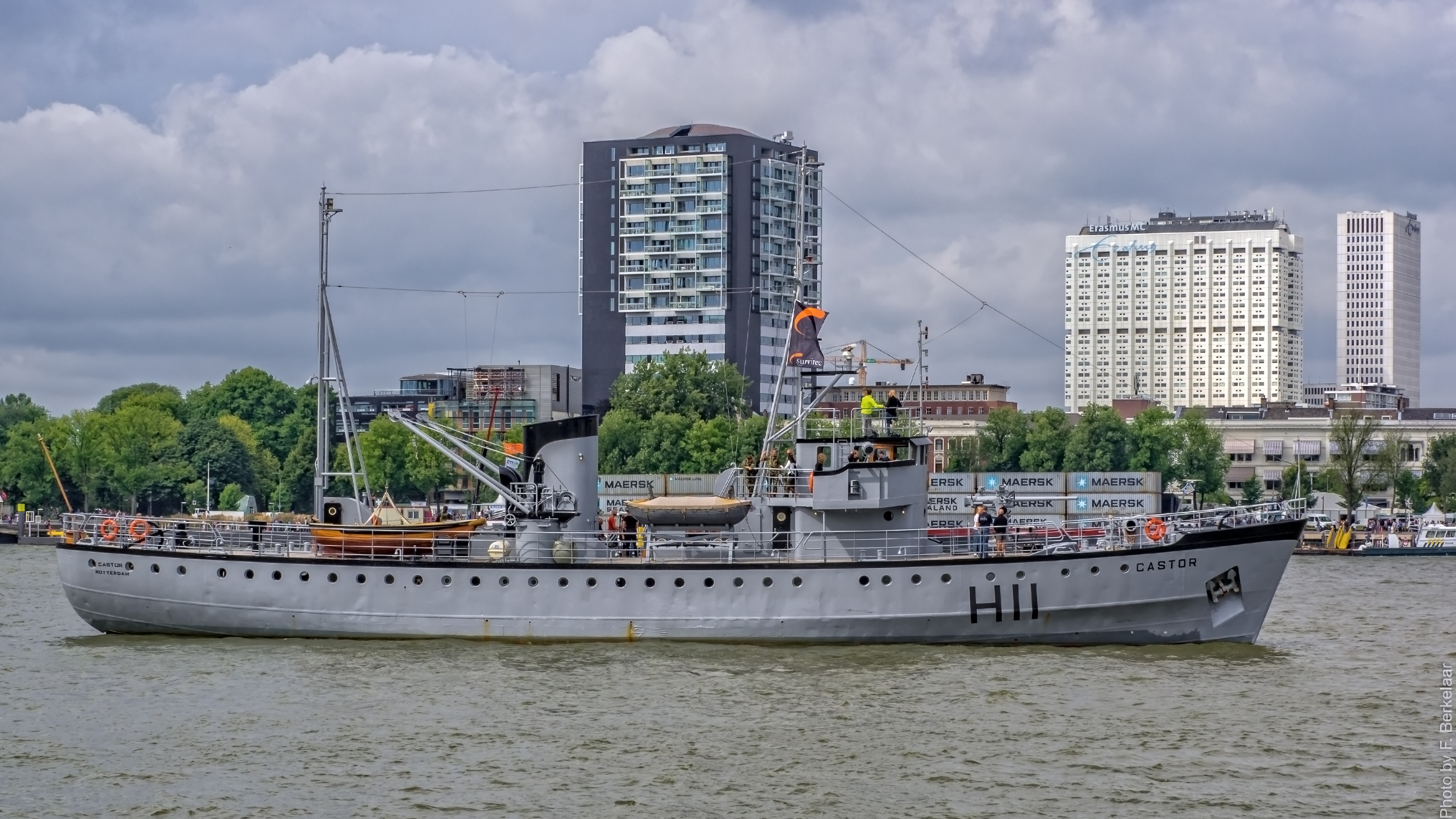
MLV Castor was modified to resemble HMS Basilisk.

Early scenes of the film were shot at Weymouth harbour, and the final scenes at Swanage railway station. Universal Pictures' Falls Lake studio in Los Angeles was used for interior and exterior sets of a sinking ship and plane, with the ship interiors filmed in a water tank using stuntmen. To get acclimatised to cold water scenes, Styles and Whitehead underwent training sessions at Point Dume.

Crowley and marine coordinator Neil Andrea located nearly sixty ships, which Nolan had reconditioned for the shoot. These included the retired French Navy destroyer Maillé-Brézé, which was made to look like a 1940 British warship as there were no wartime British destroyers left with working engines. Three retired Royal Netherlands Navy ships were also used: the minesweeper HNLMS Naaldwijk portrayed HMS Britomart, HNLMS Sittard portrayed HMS Havant and HMS Jaguar, and MLV Castor (a Royal Netherlands Navy armed pilot vessel) portrayed HMS Basilisk. The motor torpedo boat MTB 102 and the 1930s Norwegian steamer Rogaland were also used. Over fifty other boats included twenty actual Little Ships of Dunkirk, piloted by their owners. A small 1930s motor yacht called Moonstone served for six weeks of filming; its most demanding scenes, with up to sixty people on a boat designed for fewer than ten, were shot on the Dutch lake IJsselmeer to avoid the challenge of the Dunkirk tides. The hospital ship which was sunk in the beginning, was the Norwegian cargo ship, and World War II veteran, MS Rogaland.

One of the Spitfires was repainted for the film.

The Aerostar Yak-52TW N699DP in 2016, which was modified to resemble a Spitfire for the film.

Aircraft were equipped with dual cockpits for filming in flight. A Yakovlev Yak-52TW was modified to resemble a Supermarine Spitfire, and two Supermarine Spitfire Mark IAs, a Spitfire Mark VB, and a Hispano Buchon painted to look like a Messerschmitt Bf 109E, were also used for the combat scenes, flying to Urk from Lelystad Airport. Large-scale radio-controlled model aircraft were filmed crashing into the English Channel. The real Spitfires were provided by the Imperial War Museum Duxford, and owner Dan Friedkin piloted the one that was filmed landing on the beach in Dunkirk. These takes had to be done within forty-five minutes, before the tide came back in. IMAX cameras were attached to the fighter planes using specially made snorkel and periscope lenses—in the back and the front—and large-scale mockups were submerged with cable rigs for a crash scene. Scroggins Aviation and Gateguards UK performed period aviation reconstruction. Aerospatiale Ecureuil G-WHST, with IMAX cameras front, and a Piper Aerostar enabled filming from the air, also with IMAX cameras front and rear. Dogfights over the Channel were shot by an aerial unit based at Lee-on-Solent Airfield and one at Lelystad Airport in the Netherlands. Hardy and Lowden spent the final stages of the shooting schedule on a cliffside in Palos Verdes, inside purpose-built cockpit gimbals, with limited contact with the rest of the cast and crew. Dunkirk wrapped on 2 September 2016, after sixty-eight days.

The film was shot in natural lighting using both IMAX 65 mm and 65 mm large format film stock in Panavision System 65, with more IMAX footage than in any of Nolan's previous films—an estimated seventy-five per cent. The sparsity of dialogue made it possible for IMAX cameras, which are notoriously noisy, to be used as the primary format. Panavision and IMAX lenses enabled filming at night. For the first time in a feature film, IMAX cameras were used hand-held, which Steven Spielberg and Ron Howard advised as the best way to shoot on vessels.

=== Post-production ===
Nolan's regular collaborator Lee Smith returned to edit Dunkirk, beginning in September 2016 after Smith had assembled shots unsupervised while filming was still in progress. Editing took place in Los Angeles with an audio mixing team of eight people. Nolan singled out the editing of the aerial sequences as a particular challenge, likening this to a chess game. Limited computer-generated imagery was applied to improve some scenes, but none consisted entirely of CGI. Weather continuity presented less of a challenge than was expected, with filming both in Europe and California. At least ten to fifteen feature-length versions were cut to further refine the dramatic impact. Once a cut was completed, only then did they apply music.

Post-production had fifty-four hours of raw footage to work with. The only usable sounds from production recordings were voices—everything else was recreated. Sound designer Richard King sent two sound mixers to audio record the Spitfires at the Imperial War Museum Duxford using twenty-four microphones. Unable to find an actual dive siren of a Stuka dive bomber, King reverse engineered one from old photographs in an attempt to replicate the sound. For scenes in which ships gave out sounds of people in distress, voices were captured using an ADR "loop group". C-4 and liquid propane were blown up to record sound for the explosions. Also featured were the whistles attributed to German bombs during the Second World War. Bomb noises were made to increase in pitch the closer they got to impact, to stay true to reality. Double Negative undertook the visual effects work. FotoKem, the film laboratory, also handled the release prints.

=== Music ===
Hans Zimmer began working on the score in 2016, continued for eleven months, and eventually created a 100-minute demo. For intensity, the script was written to accommodate the auditory illusion of a Shepard tone, which had previously been explored in Nolan's 2006 film The Prestige. This was coupled with the sound of Nolan's own pocket watch, which he recorded and sent to Zimmer to be synthesised. Zimmer also heightens the tension with subtle Risset rhythms throughout the entire movie—seemingly endless increases in tempo (however, these effects were removed for the official soundtrack release). Additional music was provided by Lorne Balfe, Andrew Kawczynski, Steve Mazzaro and Benjamin Wallfisch.

"Nimrod" from Edward Elgar's Enigma Variations is part of the theme, which was slowed down to six beats per minute with added bass notes to avoid it sounding sentimental. Instrumentation included a double bass and fourteen cellos played in high register. King relayed to Zimmer the sound of a boat engine, which served as a reference for the tempo. Zimmer visited the Dunkirk set for inspiration, taking back a jar of sand, and chose not to view raw footage whilst composing. The music was recorded at AIR Lyndhurst Hall with mix engineer Geoff Foster.

== Release ==
The world premiere was on 13 July 2017 at Odeon Leicester Square in London. The film was theatrically released on 21 July, projected on IMAX 70mm, digital, 70 mm and 35 mm film. It is the fourth Nolan film to be released in the third week of July, a period in which Warner Bros. Pictures has previously achieved success. It was Nolan's preference that the film opened in July instead of the northern-hemisphere autumn awards season. The film was initially screened in 125 theatres in 70 mm, the widest release in that format in twenty-five years.

Dunkirk received a special IMAX screening at the 2017 Toronto International Film Festival, the first Nolan film to appear at the festival since Following, nineteen years earlier. This screening also coincided with the 50th anniversary of IMAX. After its original release of 126 days, the film was re-released in fifty IMAX and 70 mm theatres on 1 December, expanding to 250 additional cities in January 2018.

=== Home media ===
Dunkirk was released digitally on 12 December 2017, and on 4K, Blu-ray and DVD on 18 December 2017 in the United Kingdom and 19 December 2017 in the United States.

=== Marketing ===
The announcement teaser debuted in cinemas ahead of Suicide Squad and was released online on 4 August 2016. According to data analytics firm ListenFirst Media, it generated the most Twitter engagement of any trailer released that week. The first full-length trailer was released on 14 December 2016, alongside a five-minute cinema-exclusive prologue shown before selected IMAX screenings of Rogue One: A Star Wars Story. Dunkirk was the most discussed film that week according to media measurement firm Comscore. The prologue returned for a week before selected IMAX showings of Kong: Skull Island. Footage from the film was well received at CinemaCon 2017.

Warner Bros. aired a TV spot to coincide with the 2017 NBA playoffs. The official trailer was released on 5 May 2017, after a countdown on the film's website and four 15-second teasers leading up to it. Dunkirk was again the most discussed film that week according to ComScore. The video game developer Wargaming included in its titles World of Tanks, World of Warships and World of Warplanes missions and rewards related to the film. On 6 July, Warner Bros. released another trailer, which for the third time was the most discussed film of the week. The prologue was shown at selected Wonder Woman IMAX screenings in July. It also toured three European countries with a mobile cinema.

Sue Kroll, president of Warner Bros. Worldwide Marketing and Distribution, said that it was important that Dunkirk be marketed as a summer event movie as opposed to a period war film, to highlight its "magnificent scale and originality". This strategy was maintained throughout the campaign. To convince audiences that the film was best experienced in theatres, the prologue was never made available online. TV spots were distributed sporadically during sports games and notable television series to establish the film's themes. Social media infographics described the scale and importance of the Dunkirk evacuation. Additionally, a Google 360 Experience interactive adventure, an Amazon Alexa programme and a 360-degree short film, were created. In partnership with fast food restaurant Carl's Jr., the film was branded on four million cups, as well as pop-ups at nearly 3,000 locations. Research saw the film appeal to twenty per cent of infrequent moviegoers.

== Reception ==
=== Box office ===
Dunkirk grossed $189.7 million in the United States and Canada, and $340.6 million in other countries, for a worldwide total of $530 million, against a production budget of $100–150 million. Globally, it became the highest-grossing World War II film (not adjusting for inflation) at the time, surpassing Saving Private Ryan's $482 million, until it was surpassed by Nolan's own Oppenheimer in 2023.

In the United States and Canada, industry tracking for the opening weekend ranged from Variety's $30–40 million to Deadline Hollywood's $35 million, while BoxOffice speculated an opening weekend of $55 million, and IndieWire $50 million and $500 million worldwide. Dunkirk made $19.8 million on its first day, including $5.5 million from preview screenings. It went on to finish first at the box office with $50.5 million, marking the third-largest opening for a World War II film (behind Captain America: The First Avenger's $62.1 million and Pearl Harbor's $59.1 million), as well as the fourth-largest of Nolan's career. In its second weekend, it grossed $26.6 million (a drop of 44.3%), beating newcomer The Emoji Movie to the top spot. The film grossed $17.1 million in its third weekend, second to newcomer The Dark Tower ($19.2 million), and was again second in its fourth week, behind Annabelle: Creation with $10.9 million.

The film opened in France on 19 July 2017, and made $2.2 million on its first day. It was released in seven markets the following day, earning an additional $6.3 million, and on 21 July in forty-six more countries, grossing $12.7 million from over ten thousand theatres, including $3.7 million from the United Kingdom. The international debut totalled $55.4 million, including $4.9 million in France, $12.4 million in the UK and $10.3 million in Korea. The film remained number one in the United Kingdom for five weeks. It opened in China on 1 September in the top spot, grossing $30 million from its weekend debut. Its opening weekend in Japan earned $2.9 million from 444 screens.

=== Critical response ===
Some critics called Dunkirk Nolan's best film to date and one of the greatest war films ever made. On the review aggregator Rotten Tomatoes, the film holds an approval rating of 92% based on 469 reviews, with an average rating of 8.7/10. The website's critical consensus reads "Dunkirk serves up emotionally satisfying spectacle, delivered by a writer-director in full command of his craft and brought to life by a gifted ensemble cast that honors the fact-based story." On Metacritic, the film has a weighted average score of 94 out of 100 based on reviews from 53 critics, indicating "universal acclaim". According to MRQE, it has an average rating of 86/100, based on 128 critics. Audiences polled by CinemaScore gave the film an average grade of "A−" on an A+ to F scale, while PostTrak reported filmgoers gave it an 88% overall positive score, with 63% saying they would recommend it. The Guardian ranked the film at No. 13 on their list of "The 50 top films of 2017". The Independent named it the 7th-best film of the year. Time magazine included the film on its "Top 10 movies of 2017" list.

Peter Bradshaw of The Guardian awarded the film five out of five and called it Nolan's best to date, saying that he "surrounds his audience with chaos and horror from the outset, and amazing images and dazzlingly accomplished set pieces on a huge 70 mm screen, particularly the pontoon crammed with soldiers extending into the churning sea, exposed to enemy aircraft". Todd McCarthy of The Hollywood Reporter also lauded the film, calling it "an impressionist masterpiece" that was "deeply moving" but without "manufactured sentimentality or false heroics". He also praised the score, which "enormously strengthens the film" and "incorporates both sound and music to extraordinary effect". Peter Debruge of Variety praised the plot (although calling Zimmer's score "bombastic"), writing: "[Nolan has] delivered all the spectacle of a big-screen tentpole, ratcheting up both the tension and heroism through his intricate and occasionally overwhelming sound design". Manohla Dargis of The New York Times described the film as a "tour de force of cinematic craft and technique" and lauded Nolan's elastic approach to narrative. She named Dunkirk "the best film of 2017". Mick LaSalle of the San Francisco Chronicle called it a "triumph" and "masterpiece", commending Nolan's unique approach to directing a war film. The Economist labelled Dunkirk "a remarkable film" and a new classic. Richard Roeper of the Chicago Sun-Times gave the film four out of four and said it was one of the best war movies of the decade, describing it as "tight, gripping, deeply involving and unforgettable ... triumph in filmmaking". Chris Nashawaty of Entertainment Weekly gave the film an "A", calling it the best of 2017: "By the end of Dunkirk, what stands out the most isn't its inspirational message or everyday heroism. It's the small indelible, unshakeable images that accumulate like the details in the corner of a mural".

Robbie Collin of The Daily Telegraph gave the film five out of five, lauding it as "a work of heart-hammering intensity and grandeur". Peter Travers of Rolling Stone awarded it his first four-star rating of 2017 as "maybe the greatest war film ever", adding: "There's little doubt that [Nolan] has, without sentimentality or sanctimony, raised [the survival film] genre to the level of art ... with the resonant force of an enduring screen classic". He also called it the first major Oscar contender of the year. Michael Medved awarded it four out of four and called Hardy's performance "outstanding", and the action "seamless", declaring: "This is not only the best WWII movie since Saving Private Ryan, it is very simply one of the greatest war movies ever made". Matt Zoller Seitz of RogerEbert.com gave it a score of three and a half out of four, despite not liking the film, stating that he "loathed parts of it and found other parts repetitious or half-baked. But, maybe paradoxically, I admired it throughout, and have been thinking about it constantly". Jacques Mandelbaum of Le Monde praised the film's realism, but was disappointed that it ignores the part played by French troops. Kevin Maher in The Times gave it two out of five, saying: "[Dunkirk] is 106 clamorous minutes of big-screen bombast that's so concerned with its own spectacle and scale that it neglects to deliver the most crucial element—drama." He also suggested that Dunkirk felt like a Call of Duty video game. David Cox of The Guardian felt the film had historical inaccuracies, a paucity of female characters, small scale, a thinly characterised cast and lack of suspense. In the London Review of Books, Michael Wood compared it to the films of Luis Buñuel and commended Zimmer's soundtrack as an effective match to the film.

In 2018, a poll of 150 actors, directors, writers, producers and critics for Time Out magazine saw it ranked among the "100 Best British Films" of all time. The same year, The Washington Post named Dunkirk as one of the "23 best films of the 2000s". Rolling Stone, Total Film and Quentin Tarantino classified it as one of the best films of the 2010s. Filmmaker Denis Villeneuve cited it as among his favourite films of all time. In 2024, Looper ranked it number nine on its list of the "50 Best PG-13 Movies of All Time", writing "Leave it to Christopher Nolan to make a war movie like Dunkirk, one that can leave you on the edge of your seat without resorting to graphic violence. The PG-13 rating may limit the amount of blood on screen, but Nolan's filmmaking still makes this cinematic representation of an incredible historical event extra harrowing." In 2025, it was one of the films voted for the "Readers' Choice" edition of The New York Times' list of "The 100 Best Movies of the 21st Century," finishing at number 151.

=== Accolades ===
The film received the Best Editing award at the 23rd Critics' Choice Awards, and seven further nominations: for Best Picture, Best Director, Best Acting Ensemble, Best Cinematography, Best Visual Effects, Best Score, and Best Production Design. It also won the Best Sound award at the 71st British Academy Film Awards as well as seven nominations: for Best Film, Best Direction, Best Original Music, Best Cinematography, Best Editing, Best Production Design and Best Special Visual Effects. At the 75th Golden Globe Awards, it received three nominations, for Best Motion Picture – Drama, Best Director and Best Original Score. At the 90th Academy Awards, it was awarded Best Sound Editing, Best Sound Mixing and Best Film Editing, with five further nominations for Best Picture, Best Director, (Note: This marked Nolan's first nomination for Best Director at the Academy Awards.) Best Cinematography, Best Original Score and Best Production Design.

== Historical accuracy ==
The film was noted for its generally realistic representation of the historical evacuation. It accurately depicts a few Royal Air Force aeroplanes dogfighting the Luftwaffe over the sea, limited to one hour of operation by their fuel capacity. The combat is portrayed at much lower altitude than the reality. Destroyers and fighter aircraft were indeed held back from battle, as the Royal Navy and Air Force would have been the sole defenders against invasion. There was indeed a temporary withdrawal of destroyers during the early stages after considerable losses; however, an appeal to the Admiralty by Admiral Ramsay reversed that decision.

Also noted were the accurate depictions of how a small boat evaded aerial attack, and of how soldiers returning to England saw a civilian population largely unaware of or unaffected by the war. British officers did initially refuse to evacuate French soldiers, although Churchill later insisted that the French be evacuated alongside the British. The realism of the film was acknowledged by Dunkirk veterans, although Branagh said that some thought it was "louder than the battle".

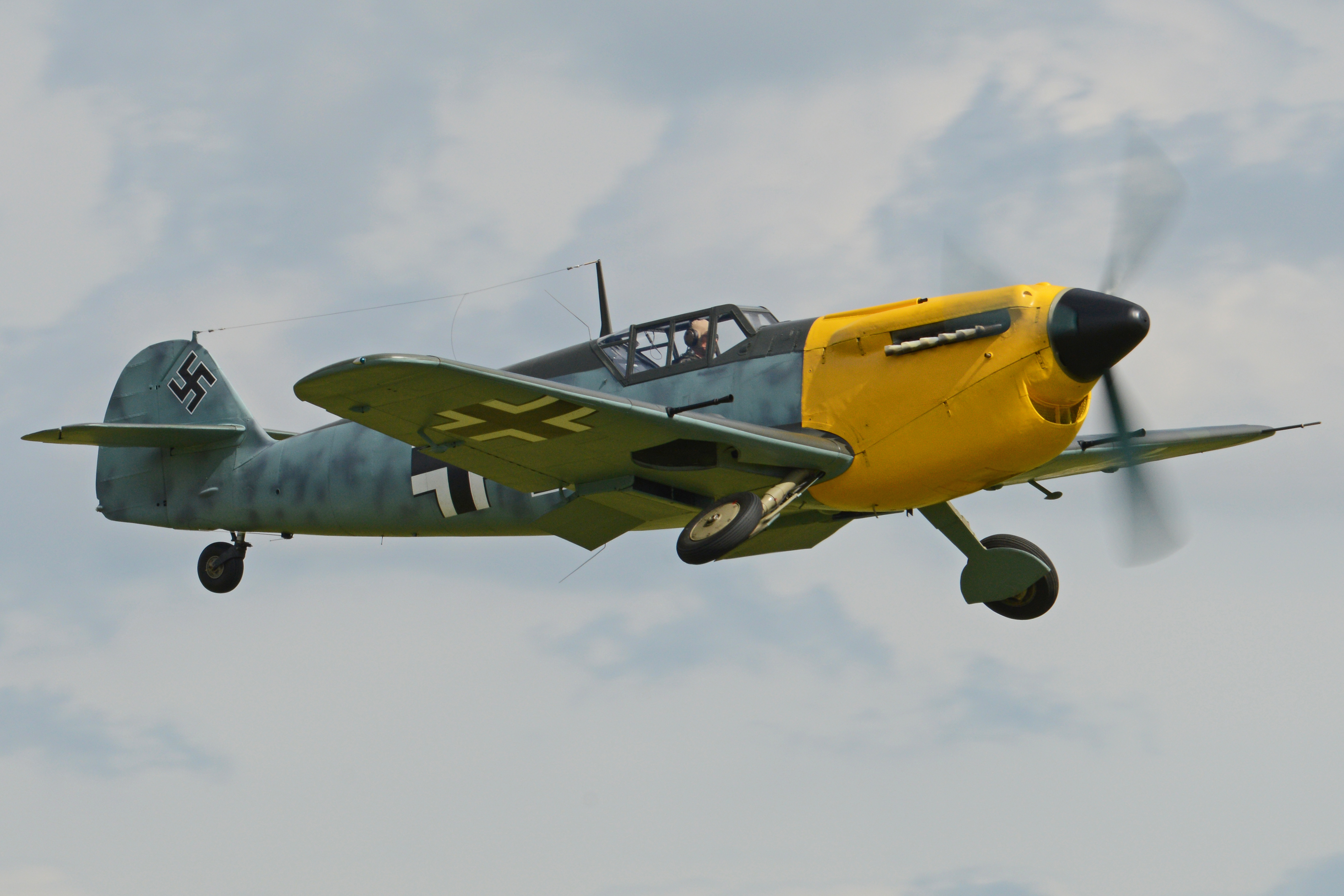
A Hispano Buchón masquerading as a Bf 109E, wearing a temporary paint scheme for the film

The characters and the storyline are fictional. Commander Bolton is a composite of several real men, including Commander James Campbell Clouston and Captain Bill Tennant. The lack of an actual depiction of Clouston drew criticism following the film's release, and attention was drawn to honour him for his role in the evacuation. Dawson is inspired by Charles Lightoller, the second officer of the Titanic and the most senior crewmember who survived the sinking, who took his yacht Sundowner to the evacuation.

The character of Collins is analogous to the experiences of Spitfire pilot Jack Potter, with Collins's ditching partly inspired by that of Eric Barwell in his Defiant. Some media outlets suggested Farrier was inspired by Alan Deere. When the beach scenes were shot, the weather was worse than during the real evacuation. Nolan explained that this helped to understand the danger faced by the pleasure boats.

In one scene, a non-commissioned officer gives a salute without wearing his military beret, which a veteran pointed out as inaccurate protocol. Noses of German planes were not actually painted yellow until after the evacuation. This was done to differentiate the German planes. Contemporary shots were used for aerial views of the town, whereas Dunkirk was in ruins by the time of the evacuation. The design of the airborne leaflet propaganda was similar to those used in 1940, although the originals were not in colour.

== See also ==
- Mrs. Miniver (1942)
- Dunkirk (1958)
- Weekend at Dunkirk (1964)
- Dunkirk (2004)
- Atonement (2007)
- Their Finest (2016)
- Darkest Hour (2017)

== Bibliography ==
- Levine, Joshua (2017). Dunkirk: The History Behind the Major Motion Picture. HarperCollins. ISBN 978-0-06-274030-4. OCLC 974672673.
- Mottram, James (2017). The Making of Dunkirk. Insight Editions. ISBN 978-1-68383-107-5. OCLC 975082674.
- Nolan, Christopher (2017). Dunkirk. Faber & Faber. ISBN 978-0-571-33625-8. OCLC 999624120.
- Kirsch, Konrad (2024). From ›Doodlebug‹ to ›Oppenheimer‹. An Analysis of Christopher Nolan's Film Work. Stuttgart / London: Edition Axel Menges. ISBN 978-3-86905-037-9.
