= Bare Necessities (TV series) =

Survival reality show

Bare Necessities is a BBC Two television survival reality show produced by Pudding Productions, which ran for two series plus a pilot episode from 1999 to 2001.

== Content ==
Co-hosted by Ed Hall and former commando survival expert Hugh McManners, two teams of three were taken to spend one week in difficult conditions, to survive while eating unpleasant food and performing demanding tasks, being judged by McManners to decide the winner of a five-star hotel holiday.

The teams were made up of contestants with the same profession, including nurses and estate agents competing in the Mexican jungle, taxi drivers and hospital doctors on a remote beach in Crete, bank managers and vegetarian students in the Sahara, models and lawyers on a desert island in Phuket, or builders and IT specialists in the Azores.

The episodes included survival tips from McManners.
