= Norman Demuth =

English composer and musicologist

Norman Demuth (15 July 1898 – 21 April 1968) was an English composer and musicologist, remembered largely for his biographies of French composers.

== Biography ==
=== Early life ===
Demuth was born in Croydon, Surrey, at 91 St James' Road. On leaving Repton School in 1915, he volunteered as Rifleman No. 2780 with the 5th London Regiment (London Rifle Brigade) in the City of London on 17 September 1915, falsifying his age by adding one year on enlistment to seek active-service for which he was then under-age. In early March 1916 he was sent to France with a reinforcement draft to the Regiment's 1st Battalion on the Western Front, and was wounded in the leg by shrapnel fragments from the accidental detonation of a Mills Bomb on 28 June 1916 in the frontline village of Hebuterne during the prelude of the Battle of the Somme. He was medically evacuated to England and subsequently discharged from the British Army as medically unfit for further war service in November 1916.

In Forgotten Voices of the Great War, Demuth says:

Almost the last feather I received was on a bus. I was sitting near the door when I became aware of two women on the other side talking at me, and I thought to myself, "Oh Lord, here we go again". One lent forward and produced a feather and said, "Here's a gift for a brave soldier." I took it and said, "Thank you very much—I wanted one of those." Then I took my pipe out of my pocket and put this feather down the stem and worked it in a way I've never worked a pipe cleaner before. When it was filthy I pulled it out and said, "You know, we didn't get these in the trenches", and handed it back to her. She instinctively put out her hand and took it, so there she was sitting with this filthy pipe cleaner in her hand and all the other people on the bus began to get indignant. Then she dropped it and got up to get out, but we were nowhere near a stopping place and the bus went on quite a long way while she got well and truly barracked by the rest of the people on the bus. I sat back and laughed like mad.

=== In between the World Wars ===
Although Demuth studied for a time at the Royal College of Music under Thomas Dunhill and Walter Parratt, also receiving much encouragement from the Bournemouth conductor Dan Godfrey, he was essentially self-taught. He played the organ in London churches and became a choral conductor.

His orchestral piece Selsey Rhapsody was one of his first compositions to be noticed. It was first performed by the London Symphony Orchestra under Adrian Boult in 1925. Further performances followed, mostly outside of London in the South East of England, where he was active as a conductor or orchestral and choral societies. One of these, for the Bogner Philharmonic Society on 1 April 1927, marked his first appearance on BBC Radio as conductor and composer. Between 1929 and 1935 Demuth was conductor of the Chichester Symphony Orchestra.

From 1930 he taught at the Royal Academy of Music, and latterly at the University of Durham. Among his pupils was Gordon Langford, whose surname was originally Colman (and who changed the name on Demuth's advice). Other pupils included Norman Fulton, King Palmer, Hugh Shrapnel and Bob Simans.

=== World War II ===
Demuth was active in the Home Guard and received a commission with the rank of lieutenant in the British Army on 23 October 1942. He served in the Pioneer Corps, for whom he composed the Regimental March in 1943. During this period he also wrote a series of handbooks on military strategy, including Harrying the Hun: A Handbook of Scouting, Stalking and Camouflage (1941), and A Manual of Street Fighting.

== Music and writing ==
Greatly sympathetic to French music, Demuth wrote a number of books on the subject. The first two, on Albert Roussel and Maurice Ravel, both appeared in 1947. Further books on César Franck, Charles Gounod, Vincent d'Indy, French Piano Music and French Opera were published over the following fifteen years. His Musical Trends in the 20th Century (1952) took a broader focus, though its judgements on German and American music are largely unsympathetic. In a scathing review in Tempo, Hans Keller, noting the hostility towards Teutonic music (especially the British émigré composers), observes that "Mr Demuth's all too transparent personal prejudices come into play" and feels obliged to sign himself off with the words "The present writer is an Austrian-born British Jew".

The French preference is evident in his own compositions, of which there were many. Demuth produced nine symphonies between 1930 and 1957, six operas between 1947 and 1959 (including Volpone, 1949, and The Orestia, 1950), and numerous orchestral ballets, concertos and overtures, works for military band, chamber music and songs, as well as much incidental music written for BBC radio plays. His orchestral set of Ravel-inspired Valses graves et gaies were premiered at the Proms in 1942 (postponed from 1940). Mason characterises his melodic style as somewhat austere, "in which definable tunes have little part", and his harmony as ranging from intense late Romantic Franckian chromaticism (the Threnody for strings of 1942) to more brittle Stravinskian neoclassicism (Overture for a Joyful Occasion, 1946).

The Viola Concerto (1951) received its first performance in 1956 with Herbert Downes as soloist. Hugh Ottaway said of the work "Designed in two linked sections, one slowish, the other quick, it made an impression through its capable workmanship and sense of purpose but did not offer much of imaginative distinction. A certain monotony of rhythm and texture was acutely felt, especially in the opening section, which is a rather busy meditation whose concertante viola part is inclined to fuss and fidget." Demuth wrote his Processional Fanfare for three trumpets and organ for the enthronement of the Lord Bishop of Chichester in 1958.

== Death ==
Demuth married the pianist and teacher Edna Marjorie Hardwick in November 1943. She died in March 1965. He died three years later in Chichester at the age of 69. His pupil Gordon Langford has expressed regret at the complete neglect of Demuth's achievements as a composer.

== Selected compositions ==
Opera
- Conte vénitien (1947)
- Le flambeau (1948)
- Volpone (1949)
- The Oresteia (1950)
- Rogue Scapin (1954)
- Beauty Awakes (1959)

Ballet

- Undine (1927)
- Portia Mortis (1933)
- The Flame (1936)
- The Temptation of St Anthony (1937) choreographic symphony
- Planetomania (1940)
- Complainte (1946)
- Bal des fantômes (1949)
- La débutante (1949)

Incidental music

- The Flies (Sartre) (1947)
- Médée (Jean Anouilh) (1948)
- Prometheus Bound (Aeschylus) (1948)
- Prometheus Unbound (Shelley) (1948)
- Macbeth (Shakespeare) (1949)
- Hippoytus (Euripides) (1950)
- The Misanthrope (Molière) (1950)

Choral

- Pan's Anniversary (Ben Jonson, Keats, Shelley) (1952)
- Sonnet (Donne) (1953)
- Phantoms (Walt Whitman) (1953)
- Requiem (1954)

Symphonies

- No 1 in D minor (1930)
- No 2 in A (1931)
- No 3 Mystical (1932) choral symphony (1932)
- No 4 (1932)
- No 5 (1934)
- No 6 (1949)
- No 7 (1950)
- No 8 (1952) for strings
- No 9 (1956–7)

Concertante

- Piano Concerto (1929)
- Concerto for alto saxophone and military band (1935)
- Violin Concerto (1937)
- Piano Concerto, left hand (1946) (written for but not performed by Paul Wittgenstein)
- Viola Concerto (1951)
- Cello Concerto (1956)
- Organ Concerto (1959)

Orchestral

- Sussex Rhapsody No 1 'Selsey' (1925)
- Cortège (1931)
- Nocturne (Paris) (1932)
- Introduction and Allegro (1936)
- Partita (1939)
- Valses graves et gaies (1940)
- Threnody (1942) for strings
- Fantasia and Fugue (performed in Bedford, 25 June 1945)
- Overture for a Joyful Occasion (1946)
- Two Symphonic Studies (1949-50)
- Divertimento No. 1, for strings (1951)

Chamber and instrumental

- Violin Sonatas Nos 1, 2 and 3 (1937, 1938, 1948)
- Flute Sonata (1938)
- Cello Sonata (1939)
- Three Preludes (1946), piano left hand (written for, but not performed by Paul Wittgenstein)
- Trio for flute, oboe and bassoon (1949)
- String Trio (1950)
- String Quartet (1950)
- Quartet for flute and piano trio (1955)
- Three Pastorals after Ronsard, for solo flute (1955)
- Processional Fanfare (1958) for organ (originally three trumpets and organ)
- Sonata for tenor saxophone (1961)
- Two Pieces for Organ (1962)
- Viola Sonata (1964)

== Selected books and articles ==
- Ravel (1947)
- Albert Roussel: A Study (1947)
- Anthology of Musical Criticism (1947)
- César Franck (1949)
- Vincent d'Indy 1851–1931: Champion of Classicism—A Study (1951)
- A Course in Musical Composition (4 volumes) (1951)
- Musical Trends in the 20th Century (1952)
- Musical Forms & Textures: A Reference Guide (1953)
- French Piano Music: A Survey with Notes on its Performance (1959)
- French Opera: Its Development to the Revolution (1963)
