= Melissa Porter =

English television presenter (born 1972)

- Born: Melissa Jayne Tindiglia; 18 December 1972 (age 53); Wythenshawe, Manchester, England
- Occupation: TV presenter
- Known for: To Buy or Not to Buy; Escape to the Country; The Renovation Game; Get a New Life

Melissa Porter (born 18 December 1972) is an English television presenter, best known for her BBC programmes To Buy or Not to Buy and Escape to the Country.

== Early life ==
Melissa Jayne Tindiglia was born in Wythenshawe, Manchester, the middle of three sisters of Italian-Czech parentage. Her father was an importer of luxury Italian motorcars. Porter got the property bug from her parents as they moved from one house renovation project to the next in Cheshire.

== Career ==
After graduating with a degree in Retail Marketing from Manchester Metropolitan University, Porter worked as a marketing manager for Marks & Spencer, Kodak and a brand manager for Playtex. She then worked as a professional relocator for a company based in Knightsbridge.

While on a team building exercise, her colleagues suggested she ought to consider a career in television. Porter put a show reel together and CV, and got her first break in 2002 on Granada TV's Men and Motors. Porter then moved to the BBC, presenting a number of shows including Put Your Money Where Your House Is and Get a New Life. Porter has written on property for the Mail on Sunday and Yahoo.

In 2007, Porter presented in the series Countryfile: The Summer Diaries and Escape to the Country. Porter has also presented new segments on travel, relocation and buying property for Barclaycard on GMTV. She has also presented on Live the Dream: As Seen on TV with Nick Barratt.

She has renovated and sold hundreds of homes and sold several without using an estate agent. Her most recent design project is 11 luxury apartments on the Kings Road, Chelsea, London.

She was the frontperson for Oral B toothpaste television advertisements.

== Personal life ==
Formerly married, Porter has a son.

Porter is a patron of the British Thyroid Foundation.
