= Cross Fire (Spinners album) =

Studio album by the Spinners
- Released: March 19, 1984
- Genre: Soul
- Length: 43:19
- Language: English
- Label: Atlantic
- Producer: Keg Johnson; Dana Meyers; James Sylvers; Leon Sylvers III; Ricky Sylvers; William Zimmerman

The Spinners chronology
Grand Slam (1982)	Cross Fire (1984)	Lovin' Feelings (1985)

Cross Fire is a 1984 studio album by American soul music vocal group the Spinners, released on Atlantic Records. This release continued a commercial decline that the group experienced beginning in the late 1970s and was their final album on long-time label Atlantic.

The album featured the group's final major R&B chart hit, with "Right or Wrong" peaking at number 22 that same year.

== Reception ==
Editors at AllMusic Guide scored Cross Fire two out of five stars.

== Track listing ==
1. "Two of a Kind" (Kamau Peterson and Dorie Pride) – 4:29
2. "Right or Wrong" (Peterson and Pride) – 5:09
3. "(We Have Come Into) Our Time for Love" (Dana Marshal, Dana Meyers, Wilmer Raglin, and William Zimmerman) – 5:37
4. "Cross Fire" (Marshal, Meyers, Raglin, and Zimmerman) – 5:20
5. "Keep On Keepin' On" (Ahmad Abdullah and Leon Sylvers III) – 6:33
6. "Not Just Another Lover" (Vincent Brantley, Pamela Phillips-Oland, and Rickey Smith) – 4:27
7. "Love Is in Season" (Phillips-Orland, Raglin, and Zimmerman) – 3:51
8. "All Your Love" (Marshal and James Sylvers) – 3:58
9. "Secrets" (Gary McGill) – 3:55

== Chart performance ==
Cross Fire reached 47 on the R&B chart and did not land on the Billboard 200. The album spent several months on Jet's Top Albums from May to August 1984.

== Personnel ==
The Spinners

- John Edwards – vocals, backing vocals, lead vocals on "Two of a Kind", "Right or Wrong", "(We Have Come Into) Our Time for Love", "Keep On Keepin' On", "Not Just Another Lover", "All Your Love", and "Secrets"
- Henry Fambrough – vocals; backing vocals; lead vocals on "Right or Wrong", "(We Have Come Into) Our Time for Love", "Cross Fire", "Keep On Keepin' On", and "Love Is in Season"; string arrangement on "(We Have Come Into) Our Time for Love"
- Billy Henderson – vocals, backing vocals
- Pervis Jackson – vocals, backing vocals, lead vocals on "Love Is in Season"
- Bobby Smith – vocals, backing vocals

Additional personnel

- Clifford Bailey, Jr. – percussion on "Two of a Kind"
- Vincent Brantley – rhythm arrangement on "Not Just Another Lover"
- Horace "Bokie" Coleman – guitar on "Two of a Kind", "Right or Wrong", "(We Have Come Into) Our Time for Love", "Cross Fire", and "Keep On Keepin' On"; bass guitar on "Right or Wrong"
- Les Cooper – additional engineering, mixing
- Bob Defrin – art direction
- Kirk Farraioli – additional engineering, mixing
- Jeff Forehan – Fairlight CMI programming on "Two of a Kind", "Right or Wrong", "(We Have Come Into) Our Time for Love", and "Cross Fire"
- Arne Frager – engineering
- Mike Franke – engineering
- Marlo Henderson – guitar on "Not Just Another Lover" and "Love Is in Season"
- Keg Johnson – production on "Keep On Keepin' On"
- Dana Meyers – percussion on "(We Have Come Into) Our Time for Love"; horn arrangement on "Two of a Kind", "Right or Wrong", and "(We Have Come Into) Our Time for Love"; vocal arrangement on "Two of a Kind", "Right or Wrong", "(We Have Come Into) Our Time for Love", and "Cross Fire"; string arrangement on "Two of a Kind" and "Right or Wrong"; production on "Two of a Kind", "Right or Wrong", "(We Have Come Into) Our Time for Love", and "Cross Fire"
- Bob Morris – guitar on "All Your Love"
- Jim Perkins – engineering
- Wardell Potts, Jr. – drums on "Two of a Kind", "Right or Wrong", and "(We Have Come Into) Our Time for Love"
- Earnest "Pepper" Reed – guitar on "Keep On Keepin' On"
- Todd Schorr – cover art
- Scott Skidmore – engineering, mixing
- Rickey Smith – bass guitar on "Keep On Keepin' On" and "Not Just Another Lover", keyboards on "Not Just Another Lover" and "All Your Love", bass synthesizer on "Keep On Keepin' On", rhythm arrangement on "Not Just Another Lover"
- James Sylvers – bass guitar on "All Your Love", drums on "All Your Love", bass synthesizer on "All Your Love", rhythm arrangement on "All Your Love", vocal arrangement on "All Your Love", keyboards on "All Your Love", production on "All Your Love"
- Leon Sylvers III – percussion on "Not Just Another Lover" and "Secrets"; drum programming on "Not Just Another Lover" and "Secrets"; vocal arrangement on "Keep On Keepin' On", "Not Just Another Lover", "Love Is in Season", and "Secrets"; rhythm arrangement on "Secrets"; production on "Keep On Keepin' On", "Not Just Another Lover", "Love Is in Season", and "Secrets"; executive production on "Two of a Kind"
- Ricky Sylvers – drum programming on "Keep On Keepin' On", rhythm arrangement on "Keep On Keepin' On", production on "Keep On Keepin' On"
- Wally Trauget – mastering
- William Zimmerman – bass synthesizer on "Two of a Kind", "Right or Wrong", "(We Have Come Into) Our Time for Love", "Cross Fire", "Love Is in Season", and "Secrets"; keyboards on "Two of a Kind", "Right or Wrong", "(We Have Come Into) Our Time for Love", "Cross Fire", "Keep On Keepin' On", "Not Just Another Lover", "Love Is in Season", and "Secrets"; drum programming on "Cross Fire", "Keep On Keepin' On", and "Love Is in Season"; rhythm arrangement on "Two of a Kind", "Right or Wrong", "(We Have Come Into) Our Time for Love", "Cross Fire", "Keep On Keepin' On", "Love Is in Season", and "Secrets"; string arrangement on "Two of a Kind" and "(We Have Come Into) Our Time for Love"; horn arrangement on "Two of a Kind"; production on "Right or Wrong", "(We Have Come Into) Our Time for Love", "Cross Fire", "Keep On Keepin' On", "Love Is in Season", and "Secrets"

== See also ==
- List of 1984 albums
