= Stephen (musician) =

American electronic music singer-songwriter

- Also known as: Stephen Swartz (until 2015)
- Born: Stephen Michael Swartz; December 13, 1991 (age 34); Vienna, Virginia, U.S
- Genres: Electronic, alternative, experimental, hip hop, rock
- Occupations: Musician, singer-songwriter, producer, instrumentalist
- Instruments: Vocals, drums, synthesizer, guitar, piano
- Years active: 2012–2021
- Labels: Halfway House Records; Monstercat; Heroic Music Group
- Website: sincerelystephen.com

Stephen Michael Swartz (born December 13, 1991), known mononymously as Stephen, is an American electronic music artist, singer-songwriter, and producer. He is primarily known for his song "Bullet Train" featuring Joni Fatora, as well as the single "Crossfire" from his debut album Sincerely. His works have been noted for their exploration of social issues, internal conflict, and identity.

== Early life ==
Stephen was raised in Vienna, Virginia (a suburb of Washington D.C), and has described his upbringing as "lucky and fortunate". He attributes much of his early passion for music to his family, who supported him in learning the piano at five years old. He began playing the drums in middle school, while his brother was learning the electric guitar. Stephen's mother, a music therapist and vocalist, would accompany them with the flute or piano to play songs that the two boys had created. In high school, he joined a local band as a drummer and producer, following an invitation from his former soccer teammate at a party. His work on the band's first EP significantly contributed to his interest in music production, and he later began producing for other artists around the Northern Virginia region. He graduated Vienna's James Madison High School in 2010.

== Career ==
Stephen's earliest releases were published under his full name and primarily comprised electronic dance music (EDM) productions and remixes. While studying audio engineering at the University of Miami's Frost School of Music, he collaborated with fellow student Joni Fatora to produce "Bullet Train", which was released as his debut single on June 24, 2012. Featuring Fatora's vocals, the track attracted interest from several music publications, eventually accumulating over 100 million streams. Through the online dubstep music promoter Ethan Baer, Stephen was introduced to Nathan Lim and Jake Udell of the talent management agency Th3rd Brain and began sending them his music. Subsequently, having found that his course "wasn't quite the right fit" due to its largely technical focus, he dropped out of his final year of university and relocated to Los Angeles in July 2013, after being signed with the company.

In 2015, he stopped using his last name professionally, and released an indie rock cover of Adele's "Hello". The track marked a departure from his previous EDM works and was the first to feature his own vocals.

In January 2016, he appeared as a featured artist alongside Caleborate on Pell's "In the Morning".

His debut album Sincerely, was released on May 10, 2016. The album incorporated a blend of indie rock, alternative pop and R&B on top of his electronic production, and received attention for its introspective and socially conscious focus.

In the midst of his first tour, Stephen's career was unexpectedly paused after being diagnosed with Lyme disease. His EP It's Too Much Love to Know My Dear was self-released on March 13, 2019, after an extended break.

His second studio album, Akrasia, was released on August 21, 2020.

== Discography ==
=== Albums ===
Year	Details
2016	Sincerely: Released: May 10, 2016; Label: Halfway House Records
2020	Akrasia: Released: August 21, 2020; Label: Heroic Music Group

=== Extended plays ===
Year	Details
2017	Crossfire: The Series: Released: March 29, 2017; Label: Halfway House Records
2019	It's Too Much Love to Know My Dear: Released: March 13, 2019; Independently released

=== Singles ===
Year	Title	Album
2012	"Bullet Train" (featuring Joni Fatora)	Non-album singles
2012	"Survivor" (featuring Chloe Angelides)	Non-album singles
2015	"Remembering Myself"	Sincerely
2015	"Fly Down"	Sincerely
2015	"Hello"	Non-album single
2015	"Crossfire"	Sincerely
2016	"Sincerely"	Sincerely
2016	"Crossfire, Part II" (featuring Talib Kweli and KillaGraham)	Crossfire: The Series
2017	"Crossfire, Part III" (featuring Saba, Ravyn Lenae, The O'My's, J.P. Floyd, Nikko Washington, & Aisha Yousaf)	Crossfire: The Series
2018	"Play Me Like a Violin"	Non-album singles
2018	"Stay" (featuring Lindsey Cook)	Non-album singles
2018	"Man That I'll Miss"	Non-album singles
2020	"I Never Stay in Love"	Akrasia
2020	"Tracer"	Akrasia
2020	"Stray Nights"	Akrasia
2020	"Delilah"	Akrasia
2021	"Terrified of Loving You" (with Harrisun and Taylor Ravenna)	Non-album single
