= Xfire (disambiguation) =

Xfire may refer to:

- Xfire, instant messaging service targeted toward gamers, and also game server browser
- Codehaus XFire, web services framework
- X-Fire (game show), British television programme

== See also ==
- Crossfire, Xfire is an abbreviation of
