= Ed Hall (television presenter) =

British television presenter

Ed Hall (born 16 March 1974) in Ascot, Berkshire is a British television presenter best known for being a co-presenter on BBC daytime television show To Buy or Not to Buy. He began his broadcast career as a reporter for The Sunday Show. He has also presented the Channel 4 paintball show XFire and acted as an interviewer for the first two series of Techno Games.

== Filmography ==
Hall has one film credit, a bit part (bus driver) in the British movie short Tug of War (2006).

Hall is credited with writing material for two television shows, The Kevin Bishop Show (2008, 2009) and Comedy Showcase (2007).

Hall has narrated or appeared in the following television shows or series:

- We Can Work It Out (1998)
- The Haunted Fishtank (1998)
- Starship Bloopers (1998)
- The Basement (1998)
- Soap Fever (1999)
- Starship Bloopers 2 (1999)
- Bare Necessities (2000)
- A Question of TV (2001)
- Liquid News (2001)
- I Love the '80s (2001)
- The Big Breakfast (2001, 2002)
- The Wright Stuff (2004)
- The Celebrity Penthouse (2004)
- How Not to Decorate (2004)
- The Farm (2004)
- Win, Lose or Draw Late (2004)
- Brainiac: Science Abuse (2004)
- Nice House, Shame About the Garden (2005)
- Bamboozle (2005)
- It's All Gone King Kong (2005)
- To Buy or Not to Buy (2008)
- Max Payne: Movie Special (2008)
