= To Buy or Not to Buy =

- Genre: Reality
- Presented by: various
- Country of origin: United Kingdom
- Original language: English

Production
- Production location: BBC Birmingham
- Running time: 30 or 45mins

Original release
- Network: BBC One
- Release: 2003 – 2010

To Buy or Not to Buy is a British reality television series made between 2003 and 2010 for BBC One in the UK. The final series was the eleventh and contained 90 episodes, in one of two formats—either 30 or 45 minutes in length. It aired on both BBC1 and BBC2. The show also airs on Saturday mornings on RTÉ One in Ireland.

== Background ==
The show is based on the concept of housing programmes such as Location, Location, Location. The idea is to try to find a house for the participants and allow them to test it out before deciding if they want to put in an offer for the house.

== Format ==
The episodes follow a set pattern. After introducing the prospective buyers and their idea of an ideal home, including location, features and price range, each of the two presenters selects a property they feel fits that ideal. A third property, the so-called 'wild card', may not fully fit this wish list, but is believed to be adequate by the presenters.

The prospective buyers are then given the opportunity to inspect each property, discussing its flaws and merits with the presenters before guessing the property's price. They are then allowed to choose one property for an in-depth 'try before you buy' segment, where they can test drive the property more leisurely. A 'mystery' surveyor often then looks at the property and finds some defects, which are then communicated by the presenters. The episode concludes with a final conversation with the prospective buyers, asking them whether they are in fact interested in purchasing the property.

== Presenters ==
Throughout the programme, both presenters engage in mildly disparaging yet good-natured banter, both among themselves and with the participants. The final presenters were Jenny Powell, Simon O'Brien, Rani Price, Garold Howesington and Ed Hall.

The original presenter teams was Dominic Littlewood with Kristian Digby, who were joined by Sarah Walker at the end of the first series, as 10 hour-long 'specials' were made, with Walker doing makeover on the contributing couples' house as they househunted with Digby and Littlewood.

For the second series, Digby and Walker paired-up, and Littlewood was joined by Melissa Porter, and then in the first half of 2005 more changes kicked in. Simon Rimmer and Walker made two series together and Digby presented with Simon O'Brien before moving on to his current co-star Ed Hall, until Digby's death 1 March 2010 aged 32.

=== Past presenters ===
Rani Price, Simon O'Brien, Jonnie Irwin, Ed Hall, Jonny Benarr, Nikki Bedi, Kristian Digby, Dominic Littlewood, Melissa Porter, Simon Rimmer, Sarah Walker, Ian Blandford, Melinda Messenger (Guest presenter), Sid Owen (Guest presenter)
