= Joshua Levine =

Author, social historian, and journalist (born 1970)

- Born: 9 April 1970 (age 56); Nassau, The Bahamas
- Occupations: Historian, journalist and author
- Notable work: Dunkirk
- Website: joshualevine.co.uk

Joshua Levine (born 9 April 1970) is an author, social historian and journalist known for his extensive work on social and military history. He has written a number of books which have been translated into many languages and was the historical advisor for Christopher Nolan's Dunkirk (2016) and Steve McQueen’s Blitz (2024).

His book Dunkirk: The History Behind the Major Motion Picture reached Number 1 in the Sunday Times Bestseller List. Levine has written and presented programmes for radio and television and has been described as the "ideal interlocutor" due to his background as a barrister, actor and historian.

== Early life ==
Levine was born on 9 April 1970 in Nassau, Bahamas to an English father and American mother. He has a degree in law.

== Career ==
Levine started his career as a barrister and practised criminal law before pivoting towards the arts and acting. As an actor he performed in productions such as Dreyfus at the Tricycle Theatre and Solid Gold Cadillac at the Garrick Theatre.

Shifting his focus to writing, he debuted his first play, Crash, at the Edinburgh Fringe in 2001. It was described by Nick Awde as having 'near flawless dialogue'. Levine followed this by writing a BBC Radio 4 play set in a barristers’ chambers called Intent to Supply starring Bill Nighy.

His debut book Forgotten Voices of the Blitz and the Battle for Britain was an oral history published in 2006. Levine followed this with several other books, including Forgotten Voices of the Somme in 2009 and Forgotten Voices of Dunkirk in 2011, continuing his exploration of pivotal wartime events through the voices of those who lived them.

Other works include the narrative histories On a Wing and a Prayer (2008), a history of aerial combat in World War I, and Beauty and Atrocity: People, Politics and Ireland’s Fight for Peace (2010), an account of the Northern Ireland Troubles which was short-listed for the Writer's Guild Best Non Fiction Book award and reviewed in The Sunday Times which said "This exemplary survey gets into the mindsets of the people at the centre of the Troubles - and every minister should be handed a copy.” The Secret History of the Blitz (2015) was long-listed for the 2016 PEN Hessell-Tiltman Prize, while Dunkirk: The History Behind the Major Motion Picture (2017) reached Number 1 in the Sunday Times Bestseller list and Number 2 in the New York Times Bestseller list. Recently he wrote The Illustrated History of the SAS (2023) with the full cooperation of the SAS and exclusive access to their archives, the book featured an exclusive interview Levine conducted with SAS navigator Mike Sadler who also wrote the book's foreword.

Levine has written many articles for national newspapers as well. These include pieces for The Sunday Times on the real child evacuees of World War II and the history behind Dunkirk, a feature for The Sunday Telegraph about the early days of flying, as well as pieces for the Daily Express on the Blitz, and for The Oldie on the history of Jewish humour.

In addition to his historical writing, Levine has been a regular presence on television and radio. He wrote and presented the BBC documentaries The Little Stamp That Became the Most Valuable Thing in the World and The Real Rachman, described by Miranda Sawyer in The Observer as 'fascinating and thoroughly entertaining'. He has also fronted Channel 4's Fighting the Red Baron (an adaptation of his book On a Wing and a Prayer) and Dunkirk: The New Evidence.

Levine appeared as an expert in Patrick Stewart's episode of Who Do You Think You Are? and Kristin Scott Thomas's My Grandfather's War. He was also the historical advisor for the BBC's Lucy Worsley's Blitz Spirit (2021) and contributed to Netflix's Greatest Events of World War 2 in Colour and Road to Victory.

Levine has also worked in the world of film. His book Forgotten Voices of Dunkirk inspired Christopher Nolan to make the film Dunkirk (2017), for which Levine was historical advisor. More recently, he worked as the historical advisor on Steve McQueen’s film Blitz (2024), his book The Secret History of the Blitz informed the project.

Levine is an International Ambassador for the Royal Air Force Museum and has given talks in London, New York, Los Angeles and Gibraltar. The talks are part of a series entitled Hidden Heroes, investigating the role of Jewish servicemen during the Second World War in order to counteract the myth that wartime Jews did not fight back. He has also interviewed actress Minnie Driver, asking her about her father's wartime role in the RAF.

== Personal life ==
Levine lives in London with his partner, actress Claire Price, and their daughter.
