= Hugh McManners =

- Born: 9 December 1952 (age 73); Oxford
- Occupations: Medical research charity director, Author, Television producer, Presenter, Journalist, Musician
- Children: Major William John McManners; Joseph McManners
- Relatives: Father Rev Prof John McManners FBA; Brother Lt Col Peter McManners; Spouse Megan McManners
- Writing career
- Genres: Fiction and Non-fiction
- Subjects: War, Military, Outdoor Activities, Geography, Travel, Adventure
- Website: hughmcmanners.com lindentreeband.com

Hugh McManners is an English musician, novelist and author; and a former campaigner for medical research to help war veterans.

== Music ==
McManners writes contemporary rock and folk songs and is currently working with producer Jez Coad on an album to be released at some point(!).

He performs solo with acoustic guitar, and with his Linden Tree Band. He has previous experience with various bands including as singer and guitarist for The BashBand, Hugh was bass guitarist for the Leicester heavy rock band Medusa in the 1970s, and the Coventry-based reggae band Cabstars.

== Life ==
He was born into an academic family in Oxford, the son of historian The Rev. Professor John McManners, and was brought up in Australia. He was educated at Sydney Church of England Grammar School, Shore, Oadby Beauchamp Upper School, Magdalen College School, Oxford, and the Royal Military Academy Sandhurst. He read Geography at St Edmund Hall, University of Oxford from 1975 to 1978.

McManners was bass guitarist in the Leicester heavy rock band Medusa, before serving eighteen years in the British Army. The majority of his time serving with 3 Commando Brigade. He was commissioned into the Royal Artillery in 1973 and was promoted Lieutenant in 1974,Captain in 1979, and Major in 1985.

He spent five years with 148 (Meiktila) Commando Forward Observation Battery, as a commando, paratrooper, and an army diving supervisor; he ran the British Army's jungle warfare training school in Belize.

During the Falklands War in 1982 he fought with his five-man naval gunfire forward observation team, with the Special Boat Service and worked with the SAS, Throughout the war, McManners team was formally assigned to the SBS, and he was awarded a Mention in Despatches. He wrote about this in his first book Falklands Commando.

McManners then passed the year-long Army Staff College course at Camberley. He was promoted Major in 1985, and spent two years working at the Ministry of Defence in London. He has served at Fort Ord California with the US Army's 2nd Infantry Division (Light), on counter terrorist duties in Armagh, Northern Ireland, and with the United Nations in Cyprus during the Turkish invasion of 1974. After commanding 17 Corunna Field Battery, he retired from the Army in 1989.

McManners was the Defence Correspondent of The Sunday Times newspaper for five years, and also contributed to other major UK newspapers including The Observer and The Daily Telegraph also writing an article in The Independent regarding the controversial shoot to kill policy. He has co-produced a list of television documentaries and series on military subjects. He co-presented the BBC2 Bare Necessities survival series and the Radio 4 series The Psychology of War. He is the author of many military books including the Scars of War, and several Dorling Kindersley titles, including the Outdoor Training Manual and the Commando Survival Guide.

In 2011, with neuroscientist Morten Kringelbach, he founded The Scars of War Foundation at the University of Oxford's The Queen's College, Oxford. McManners' research into the psychological effects of military combat on participants, joined forces with Kringelbach's neuroimaging studies into how the brain functions. This led to a five-year project to compare the brains of combat veterans of similar experiences with and without combat-related PTSD (post traumatic press disorder).

The Scars of War Foundation is developing further research into the cognitive neuroscience of combat veterans in conjunction with Prof Yair Bar-Haim of Psychological Sciences and Sagol School of Neuroscience, Tel Aviv University.

McManners has recently moved from Leicester to South Gloucestershire. He writes songs, some of which reflect on his past as a soldier and his concerns and experiences with battle trauma. He performs on his own as a singer-songwriter. His band The Linden Tree Band, is a work in progress Linden Tree Band. He has two sons.

== Works ==
- Falklands Commando
- Crowning the Dragon
- The Scars of War
- Commando Survival Guide
- Outdoor survival guide
- The Backpackers Manual
- Commando – Winning the Green Beret
- Top Guns
- The Complete Wilderness Training Manual
- Dorling Kindersley Children's Outdoor Adventure book series
- Ultimate Special Forces: The Insider's Guide to the Most Deadly Commandos
- Forgotten Voices of the Falklands: The Real Story of the Falklands War
- Gulf War One – Real voices from the Front Line
- The Sunday Service - novel
