= Sincerely (Stephen album) =

Studio album by Stephen
- Released: May 10, 2016
- Genre: Electronic; alternative
- Length: 34:54
- Label: Halfway House Records
- Producer: Stephen Swartz

Stephen chronology
Sincerely (2016)	Akrasia (2020)

Singles from Sincerely
- 1. "Remembering Myself" Released: September 1, 2015; 2. "Fly Down" Released: October 5, 2015; 3. "Crossfire" Released: December 6, 2015; 4. "Sincerely" Released: February 24, 2016

Sincerely is the debut album of American electronic music recording artist Stephen, released on May 10, 2016.

== Track listing ==
All songs produced by Stephen Swartz.

No.	Title	Length
1.	"Start a Fire" (feat. IN-Q)	2:27
2.	"Your Life"	4:06
3.	"Remembering Myself"	3:30
4.	"Line It Up"	3:27
5.	"Fly Down"	3:17
6.	"Solid as a Stone"	2:41
7.	"Outro"	2:05
8.	"Mr. Man"	4:04
9.	"Crossfire"	4:30
10.	"Sincerely"	4:47
Total length:		34:54
