= CrossFire (folk band) =

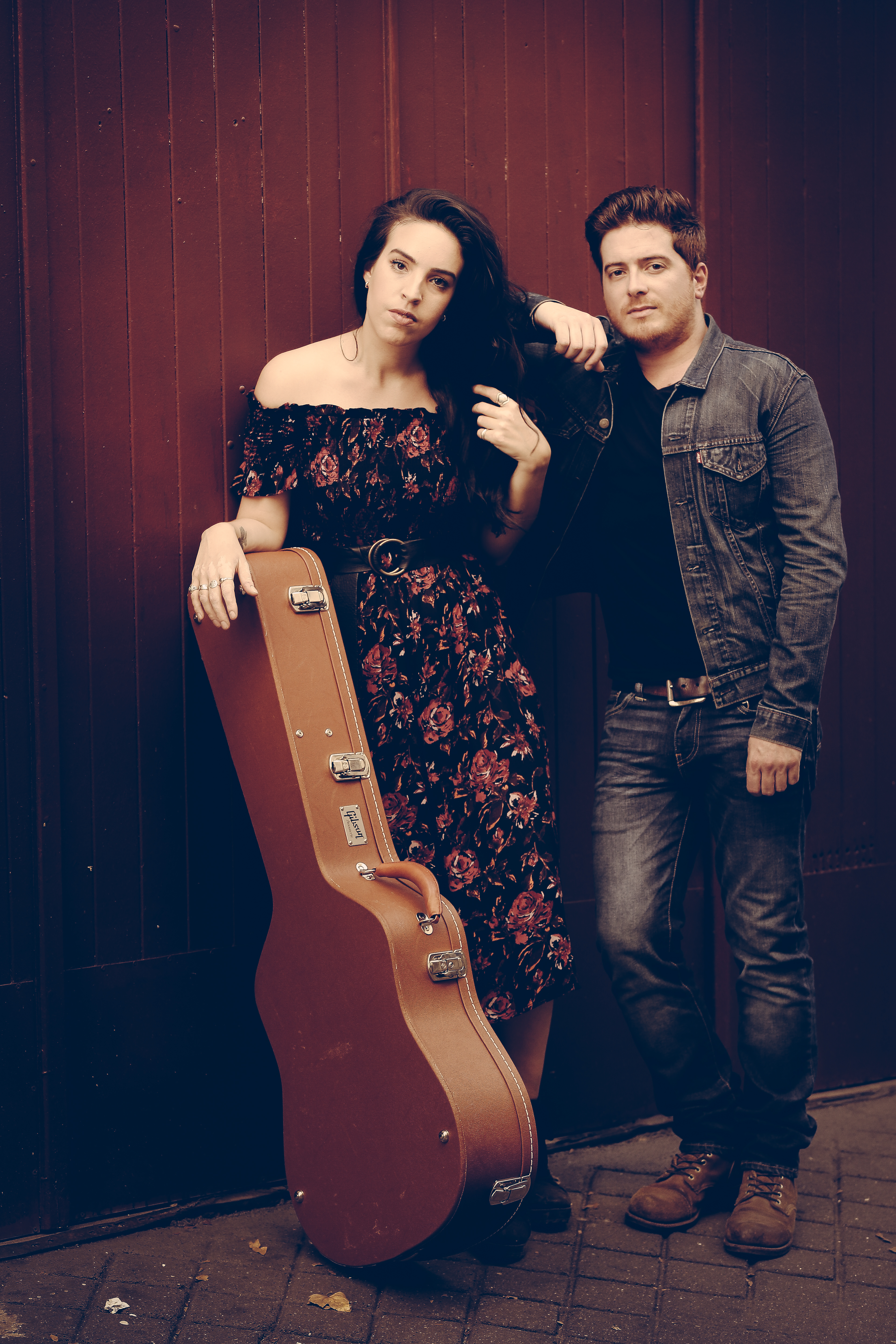
- CrossFire in 2018

Background information
- Origin: Paris, France
- Genres: Folk rock, blues
- Years active: 2015.–present
- Label: Self-Released
- Members: Allison Mareek; Stephen Giry

CrossFire is a folk rock and blues duo that got its start in Paris in 2015. The duo was created after the meeting of singer-songwriter Allison Mareek and singer-songwriter and guitarist Stephen Giry.

For the recording of the band's first LP, Drifting Ashore, additional musicians joined the band: Drummer Jeff Ludovicus, bassist Thomas d'Arbigny, violinist Nils de Caster, clarinetist Benoit Martin, and cellist Julien Grattard. Raphael Maillet (violin) has been joining the band on several occasions since 2018

The band released two studio albums to date, one 4 track EP and one LP : CrossFire – EP (2016) and Drifting Ashore (2018).

After the recording of the eponymous EP, the duo decided to fly out to America to confront their compositions to their musical origin starting with Toronto playing venues like the Tranzac Club and New York City with several concerts at the famous Rockwood Music Hall among others. Strengthened by this experience, the duo then came back to Paris and self-released this first EP in March 2016. Concerts followed, in France and abroad during which the songs for their first LP started to take form.

Following the launch and success of a Kickstarter campaign in May 2017, CrossFire entered the Music Ô Pré studios in Normandy, France in September 2017 to record their first LP which was then released in April 2018.

Drifting Ashore is a 12-track LP released on CD's, digital and 180gr vinyl that has received critical acclaim from Rolling Stone France, Guitar Part, The Guitar Channel, Music In Belgium, RockPortaal (NL) and more.

Allison Mareek is also the voice of the closing credits song to French channel TF1's movie L'Emprise in January 2015. A cover of Simon and Garfunkel's famous track "The Sound of Silence".

== History ==
Allison and Stephen were both born in France. Allison lived in the close Parisian suburbs until 2005 when she moved to Eilat, Israel following her whole family. There, she learned Hebrew to finish her high school studies before choosing to move back to Paris in 2009 to pursue her music career.

After living the early years of his life in the city of Albi, Stephen relocated to Paris in 2005 before leaving on a UK tour in 2006 with the band Black Cat Bones as guitarist. He continued his sideman career by accompanying American blues singer Keith B. Brown on tour and records from 2011 to 2014.

In 2014, while at a famous Parisian jam session at Caveau des Oubliettes the two musicians met by chance and Allison decided to make Stephen the lead guitarist for her then to be self-named project and first concert that year.

Feeling stronger in their musical relationship, the duo decided to create CrossFire in 2015, writing the first four songs that would make their first EP, released in 2016.

== Discography ==
Year	Details	2016	CrossFire – EP: Released: March 16, 2016; Labels: Self-released
Year	Details	2018	Drifting Ashore: Released: April 20, 2018; Labels: Self Released
"—" denotes a recording that did not chart or was not released in that territory.
