= X-Fire (game show) =

- Presented by: Ed Hall
- Country of origin: United Kingdom
- Original language: English
- No. of series: 1
- No. of episodes: 12+1 Un-aired

Production
- Running time: 60 minutes

Original release
- Network: Channel 4
- Release: 25 September 2001 – 20 July 2002

X-Fire (pronounced "cross-fire") was a game show hosted by Ed Hall, featuring a strike team consisting of six players armed with paintball markers (known as emulsifiers), who attempt to complete challenges in simulated special-forces-type raids against similarly-armed opponents. The contestants play games of paintball against the show's antagonists in elaborately constructed scenarios. The series was axed in 2002.

== Synopsis ==
X-Fire was a paintball-based TV game show, which aired on Channel 4 in the UK and presented by Ed Hall.

=== Players ===
The contestants were a strike team comprising six players armed with paintball markers (known as emulsifiers), who attempt to complete challenges in simulated special-forces-type raids against similarly-armed opponents. In general, the contestants play games of paintball against the show's antagonists in elaborately constructed scenarios. The series was axed in 2002.

=== Opposition ===
The teams would be opposed by a host of grunts, armed with slow-firing weapons, and the Special Forces, six individuals (with made-up character names and bios) armed with the same weapons as the contestants. Grunts would typically be dispatched quickly, whereas the Special Forces would take strong defensive positions and present serious challenges to the team. The Special Forces comprised Hellmet (Oberleutnant Helmet Strebi), Morgan (Sergeant Morgan Johnson), Private Clawz (Vanessa Upton), Dalia (Sergeant Dalia Mikneviciute), AJ (Commander Andrew J Dickens) and Little Yin (Private Anna Luong).

=== Format ===
Each programme would contain three missions, the last of which always took place in the Special Forces HQ. A shot in the head or torso was considered an emulsification and the shot party would play dead. Missions included hazards such as mines and laser tripwires, and puzzles that the teams would need to solve. Missions were also required to be completed within a time limit. The games would take place in simulated military compounds, office buildings, or bunker complexes, which were constructed at the facilities of the decommissioned RAF Bentwaters.

The missions for each episode would be based around a particular narrative, such as stopping toxic waste dumping or preventing the production of counterfeit bank notes. The Special Forces would always be involved with these evil plots, and thus had to be stopped by the strike team. The teams' actions in the challenges were rewarded with credits. Between each challenge, the teams could purchase items, such as more paintballs, shields, paint grenades, and a shotgun weapon, or buy back teammates who had been emulsified in the previous challenge.

For the final mission of each episode, the captain of the Strike Team would set a difficulty level: Easy, Standard or Extreme. This determined how many of Special Forces they would contend with and how many credits they could earn. The teams' final credits totals were used to determine their positions on the series leaderboard, and the leader competed again around a narrative of saving the world.

== Episodes ==
Thirteen episodes were made. The penultimate episode, titled "Star Wars", was never broadcast; instead, Channel 4 broadcast the final episode to end the series.

Episode	Operation	Strike Team Name	Air date
1	Retrieval	Flatout	25 September 2001
2	Counterfeit Charlie	The Specials	2 October 2001
3	Waste Disposal	The Lifeboat Team	9 October 2001
4	Clone Alone	Team Planet	16 October 2001
5	Ransom	ABC Warriors	23 October 2001
6	Project Phoenix	Ayresome Angels	29 May 2002
7	Retribution	All The Kings Men	5 June 2002
8	Germ Alert	Dangerous Divas	12 June 2002
9	Cold Thaw	North London Spirits	19 June 2002
10	Energy Crisis	The Burton Bullets	26 June 2002
11	Code Breaker	Fire Force One	3 July 2002
12	Star Wars	Magnum Force	N/A
13	Meltdown	The Burton Bullets	10 July 2002
