= Max Arthur =

British military historian (1939–2019)

- Born: 25 February 1939; Bognor Regis, England
- Died: 2 May 2019 (aged 80)
- Writing career
- Notable works: Forgotten Voices of the Great War (2002), Forgotten Voices of the Second World War (2004)
- Website: www.forgottenvoices.co.uk

Max Arthur OBE (25 February 1939 – 2 May 2019) was a military historian, author and actor who specialised in first-hand recollections of the twentieth century. In particular his works focussed on the First and Second World War.

== Life ==
In the earlier years of his life, Arthur was an actor appearing in a number of minor roles on television, most notably as Zuko in the Doctor Who episode Planet of Fire. He also appeared in the film Bloodbrothers and the television series Grange Hill.

Later in his life he changed direction and became a historian. As a historian his scholarship focussed in drawing together testimony from soldiers of their experiences during wartime. His most noted works were Forgotten Voices of the Great War (2002) and Forgotten Voices of the Second World War (2004) both in association with the Imperial War Museum.

He also presented two television documentaries: The Brits Who Fought For Spain (2008–09), for The History Channel UK and Dambusters for Optimum Releasing.

Arthur was appointed Officer of the Order of the British Empire (OBE) in the 2013 New Year Honours for services to military history.

On 2 May 2019, Arthur died of leukaemia aged 80.

== Published works ==
- Arthur, Max (23 July 1992). Men of the Red Beret. Sphere Books. ISBN 978-0747411949.
- Arthur, Max (2 December 1993). There Shall Be Wings: RAF from 1918 to the Present. Coronet Books. ISBN 978-0-340-60386-4.
- Arthur, Max (4 December 1997). The Navy: 1939 to the Present Day. Hodder & Stoughton. ISBN 978-0-340-68469-6.
- Arthur, Max (2 October 2003). Forgotten Voices of the Great War. Ebury Press. ISBN 978-0-09-188887-9.
- Arthur, Max (18 June 2004). Symbol of Courage: A History of the Victoria Cross. Sidgwick & Jackson. ISBN 978-0283073519.
- Arthur, Max (11 April 2005). Lost Voices of The Royal Navy: Vivid Eyewitness Accounts of Life in the Royal Navy from 1914-1945. Hodder. ISBN 978-0340838143.
- Arthur, Max (5 May 2005). Forgotten Voices of the Second World War. Ebury Press. ISBN 978-0-09-189735-2.
- Arthur, Max (1 June 2005). Lost Voices of the Royal Air Force. Hodder & Stoughton. ISBN 978-0340998694.
- Arthur, Max (1 March 2007). Above All, Courage: The Eyewitness History of the Falklands War. Phoenix. ISBN 978-0304362578.
- Arthur, Max (2 April 2007). Lost Voices of the Edwardians. HarperCollins. ISBN 978-0-09-188887-9.
- Arthur, Max (17 January 2008). The Busby Babes: Men of Magic. Mainstream Publishing. ISBN 978-1845963415.
- Arthur, Max (6 November 2008). When This Bloody War Is Over: Soldiers' Songs of the First World War. Piatkus. ISBN 978-0749923549.
- Arthur, Max (7 May 2009). Dambusters: A Landmark Oral History. Virgin Books. ISBN 978-0-7535-1573-0.
- Arthur, Max (29 April 2010). Fighters against Fascism: British Heroes of the Spanish Civil War. HarperCollins. ISBN 978-0-00-733080-5.
- Arthur, Max (6 June 2010). Last of the Few: The Battle of Britain in the Words of the Pilots Who Won It. Virgin Books. ISBN 978-0-7535-2227-1.
- Arthur, Max (14 October 2010). The Road Home: The Aftermath of the Great War Told by the Men and Women Who Survived It. Weidenfeld & Nicolson. ISBN 978-0753827208.
- Arthur, Max (21 September 2011). The Real Band of Brothers: First-hand Accounts from the Last British Survivors of the Spanish Civil War. Collins. ISBN 978-0007295104.
- Arthur, Max (7 May 2012). The Faces of World War I: The Great War in words & pictures. Cassell. ISBN 978-1844037124.
- Arthur, Max (22 May 2014). The Silent Day: A Landmark Oral History of D-Day on the Home Front. Hodder & Stoughton. ISBN 978-1444787542.
- Arthur, Max (19 June 2014). Last Post: The Final Word From Our First World War Soldiers. Weidenfeld & Nicolson. ISBN 978-1780227412.
- Arthur, Max (31 July 2014). Lest We Forget: Forgotten Voices from 1914-1945. Ebury Press. ISBN 978-0091960179.
- Arthur, Max (15 October 2017). Churchill: The Life: An authorised pictorial biography. Cassell. ISBN 978-1788400022.
- Arthur, Max (2 November 2017). The Paras. Hodder & Stoughton. ISBN 978-1444787580.
