= John Edwards (singer) =

American singer (1944–2025)

- Born: Jonathan Edwards; December 25, 1944; St. Louis, Missouri, U.S.
- Died: May 9, 2025 (aged 80) Atlanta, Georgia, U.S.
- Genres: Soul
- Occupation: Singer
- Instrument: Vocals
- Years active: Late 1960s–2000
- Labels: Weis; Aware; Cotillion; Atlantic
- Formerly of: The Spinners

Jonathan Edwards (December 25, 1944 – May 9, 2025) was an American soul singer who had a moderately successful solo career before becoming lead singer of the Spinners between 1977 and 2000.

== Life and career ==
Born in St. Louis, Missouri, Edwards began his musical career by singing in clubs while stationed in Germany when in the United States Army. After returning to live in Duluth, Georgia, he appeared on bills with Wilson Pickett, and James & Bobby Purify, before moving to Chicago in the late 1960s. There he met Curtis Mayfield, who introduced Edwards to producer Jo Armstead at Weis Records. He recorded several singles for the label before moving to Bell Records in 1972, and then to the Atlanta-based Aware label the following year. Produced by Floyd Smith, Edwards first achieved chart success when "Stop This Merry-Go-Round" reached number 45 on the Billboard R&B chart in 1973. He followed it up with "Messing Up A Good Thing" and a self-titled album, and then his most successful record, "Careful Man", produced by Smith and written by Jimmy Lewis, which reached number 8 on the R&B chart in 1974. It was followed by "Vanishing Love", which also made the R&B chart.

After Aware Records went out of business, Edwards did some shows with the Spinners, but also maintained a solo career on the Cotillion label, achieving two more R&B chart entries with "Baby, Hold On to Me" (1976) and "Nobody, But You" (1977). He then decided to join the Spinners on a full-time basis, and replaced Philippé Wynne as the group's lead singer in 1977. He featured as the main vocalist on their later hit singles including "Working My Way Back to You", produced by Michael Zager, which became one of the group's biggest hits, reaching number 2 on the Billboard Hot 100 in early 1980, and number 1 on the UK singles chart. He also sang lead on their 1980 remake of "Cupid", which hit No. 4 on both the US and UK Pop Charts, and No. 5 on the US R&B Chart.

Edwards remained with the Spinners until 2000, when he was incapacitated by a debilitating stroke, and was forced to retire. He died May 9, 2025, at the age of 80.
