= Ebury Publishing =

British publisher

- Parent company: Penguin Random House
- Founded: 1961; 64 years ago
- Country of origin: United Kingdom
- Headquarters location: London
- Publication types: books
- Fiction genres: general non-fiction
- Imprints: BBC Books; Ebury Press; Rider; Time Out; Virgin Books; Vermilion
- Official website: penguin.co.uk/company/publishers/ebury.html

Ebury Publishing is a division of Penguin Random House, and is a publisher of general non-fiction books in the UK. Ebury was founded in 1961 as a division of Nat Mags and was originally located on Ebury Street in London. It was sold to Century Hutchinson in 1989; Century Hutchinson was acquired by Random House. Random House merged with Penguin Group to form Penguin Random House in 2013.

Under its umbrella are the imprints BBC Books, Ebury Press, Rider, Time Out, Virgin Books, Ebury Spotlight and Vermilion—each with their own, distinct identity and specialist areas of publishing.
