= Al Green discography =

This discography includes albums and singles released by the American soul singer Al Green.

== Albums ==
=== Studio albums ===
Year	Title	Peak chart positions								Certifications	Record label
Year	Title	US	US R&B	US Gos	AUT	CAN	NL	SWE	UK	Certifications	Record label
1967	Back Up Train ^{[A]}	162	37	—	—	—	—	—	—		Hot Line
1969	Green Is Blues	19	3	—	—	28	—	—	—		Hi
1971	Al Green Gets Next to You	58	15	—	—	—	—	—	—		Hi
1972	Let's Stay Together	8	1	—	—	26	—	—	—	RIAA: Gold	Hi
1972	I'm Still in Love with You	4	1	—	—	27	—	—	—	RIAA: Platinum	Hi
1973	Call Me	10	1	—	—	—	—	—	—	RIAA: Gold	Hi
1973	Livin' for You	24	1	—	—	56	—	—	—	RIAA: Gold	Hi
1974	Al Green Explores Your Mind	15	1	—	—	16	—	—	—	RIAA: Gold	Hi
1975	Al Green Is Love	28	1	—	—	—	—	—	—		Hi
1976	Full of Fire	59	12	—	—	—	—	—	—		Hi
1976	Have a Good Time	93	12	—	—	—	—	—	—		Hi
1977	The Belle Album	103	29	—	—	—	—	—	—		Hi
1978	Truth n' Time	—	44	—	—	—	—	—	—		Hi
1980	The Lord Will Make a Way	—	—	22	—	—	—	—	—		Myrrh
1981	Higher Plane	—	62	18	—	—	—	—	—		Myrrh
1982	Precious Lord	—	—	1	—	—	—	—	—		Myrrh
1983	I'll Rise Again	—	—	4	—	—	—	—	—		Myrrh
1983	White Christmas	—	—	—	—	—	—	—	—		Myrrh
1984	Trust in God	—	—	10	—	—	—	—	—		Myrrh
1985	He Is the Light	—	—	11	—	—	—	—	—		A&M
1987	Soul Survivor	131	25	1	—	—	—	—	—		A&M
1989	I Get Joy	—	60	13	—	—	—	—	—		A&M
1992	Love Is Reality	—	—	29	—	—	—	—	—		Word/Epic
1993	Don't Look Back	—	—	—	—	—	—	41	86		RCA
1995	Your Heart's in Good Hands	—	57	—	—	—	—	—	—		MCA
2003	I Can't Stop	53	9	—	—	—	72	60	193		Blue Note
2005	Everything's OK	50	19	—	—	—	—	—	—		Blue Note
2008	Lay It Down	9	3	—	54	—	66	44	88		Blue Note
"—" denotes a recording that did not chart or was not released in that territory.

- ^{A} Album credited to Al Greene.

=== Live albums ===
- Tokyo...Live! (1978 [1981], Hi) 2-LP

=== Compilation albums ===
Year	Title	Peak chart positions						Certifications	Record label
Year	Title	US	US R&B	US Gos	CAN	NZ	UK	Certifications	Record label
1975	Al Green's Greatest Hits	17	3	—	27	—	18	RIAA: 2× Platinum; BPI: Silver	Hi
1977	Al Green's Greatest Hits, Volume II	134	33	—	—	—	—		Hi
1980	Cream of Al Green	—	—	—	—	—	—		Cream
1983	Al Green's Greatest Hits Volume One and Two	—	—	—	—	42	—		Cream
1988	Hi Life: The Best of Al Green	—	—	—	—	—	34	BPI: Silver	K-tel
1989	Love Ritual (Rare & Previously Unreleased 1968–76)	—	—	—	—	—	—		Hi
1991	One in a Million	—	—	—	—	—	—		Sony Music
1992	The Supreme Al Green: The Greatest Hits	—	—	—	—	—	—		Hi
1992	Al	—	—	—	—	—	41		Beechwood Music
1995	Al Green's Greatest Hits (reissued version)	127	34	—	—	—	—		The Right Stuff
1997	Anthology	—	—	—	—	—	—		Capitol
1997	The Very Best of Al Green	—	—	—	—	—	—	BPI: Gold	Crimson
1998	More Greatest Hits	—	78	—	—	—	—	RIAA: Gold	The Right Stuff
1998	Hi and Mighty: The Story of Al Green (1969–1978)	—	—	—	—	—	—		Hi
1999	True Love: A Collection	—	—	—	—	—	—	BPI: Gold	Music Club
2000	Greatest Gospel Hits	—	—	25	—	—	—		The Right Stuff
2000	The Hi Singles A's and B's	—	—	—	—	—	—		Hi
2000	Take Me to the River	186	98	—	—	—	—		The Right Stuff
2001	Testify: The Best of the A&M Years	—	—	—	—	—	—		A&M
2002	L-O-V-E: The Essential Al Green	—	—	—	—	—	18	BPI: Silver	Hi
2003	The Love Songs Collection	91	64	—	—	—	—		The Right Stuff
2004	Absolute Best	—	100	—	—	—	—		The Right Stuff
2004	The Immortal Soul of Al Green	—	—	—	—	—	—		The Right Stuff
2005	Love & Happiness: The Very Best of Al Green	—	—	—	—	—	146	BPI: Silver	Music Club Deluxe
2006	The Millennium Collection: The Best of Al Green	—	—	—	—	—	—		A&M
2007	The Definitive Greatest Hits	46	19	—	—	—	—		Hi
2008	What Makes the World Go 'Round?	196	—	—	—	—	—		Starbucks
2009	Greatest Hits	—	—	—	—	—	52	RIAA: Gold; BPI: Gold	Fat Possum
2011	The Best of the Gospel Sessions	—	—	46	—	—	—		New Haven
2013	The Love Songs Collection (reissued version)	—	68	—	—	—	—		Fat Possum
"—" denotes a recording that did not chart or was not released in that territory.

== Singles ==
Year	Title	Peak chart positions										Certifications	Album
Year	Title	US	US R&B	US A/C	AUS	AUT	CAN	GER	NL	NZ	UK	Certifications	Album
1967	"Back Up Train" ^{[B]}	41	5	—	—	—	63	—	—	—	—		Back Up Train
1968	"Don't Hurt Me No More" ^{[C]}	127	—	—	—	—	—	—	—	—	—		Back Up Train
1968	"A Lover's Hideaway" ^{[C]}	—	—	—	—	—	—	—	—	—	—		Back Up Train
1969	"I Want to Hold Your Hand"	—	—	—	—	—	—	—	—	—	—		Non-album single
1969	"One Woman"	—	—	—	—	—	—	—	—	—	—		Green Is Blues
1970	"You Say It"	—	28	—	—	—	—	—	—	—	—		Al Green Gets Next to You
1970	"Right Now, Right Now"	—	23	—	—	—	—	—	—	—	—		Al Green Gets Next to You
1970	"I Can't Get Next to You"	60	11	—	—	—	—	—	—	—	—		Al Green Gets Next to You
1971	"Driving Wheel"	115	46	—	—	—	—	—	—	—	—		Al Green Gets Next to You
1971	"Tired of Being Alone"	11	7	—	—	—	36	—	—	—	4	RIAA: Gold; BPI: Gold; RMNZ: Platinum	Al Green Gets Next to You
1971	"Let's Stay Together"	1	1	36	—	—	14	—	—	—	7	RIAA: Platinum; BPI: Platinum; RMNZ: 4× Platinum	Let's Stay Together
1972	"Look What You Done for Me"	4	2	—	—	—	27	—	—	—	44	RIAA: Gold	I'm Still in Love with You
1972	"I'm Still in Love with You"	3	1	33	—	—	—	—	—	—	35	RIAA: Gold	I'm Still in Love with You
1972	"Guilty"	69	29	—	—	—	—	—	—	—	—		Back Up Train
1972	"You Ought to Be with Me"	3	1	28	—	—	12	—	—	—	53	RIAA: Gold	Call Me
1973	"Hot Wire"	71	—	—	—	—	—	—	—	—	—		Back Up Train
1973	"Call Me (Come Back Home)"	10	2	—	—	—	60	—	—	—	—	RIAA: Gold	Call Me
1973	"Here I Am (Come and Take Me)"	10	2	—	—	—	73	—	—	—	—	RIAA: Gold	Call Me
1973	"Livin' for You"	19	1	—	—	—	49	—	—	—	58		Livin' for You
1974	"Let's Get Married"	32	3	—	—	—	55	—	—	—	—		Livin' for You
1974	"Sha-La-La (Make Me Happy)"	7	2	28	85	—	15	—	—	—	20	RIAA: Gold	Al Green Explores Your Mind
1975	"L-O-V-E (Love)"	13	1	—	—	—	14	—	—	35	24		Al Green Is Love
1975	"Oh Me, Oh My (Dreams in My Arms)"	48	7	—	—	—	90	—	—	—	60		Al Green Is Love
1975	"Full of Fire"	28	1	—	—	—	62	—	—	—	—		Full of Fire
1976	"Let It Shine"	—	16	—	—	—	—	—	—	—	—		Full of Fire
1976	"Keep Me Cryin'"	37	4	—	—	—	94	—	—	—	—		Have a Good Time
1977	"I Tried to Tell Myself"	101	26	—	—	—	—	—	—	—	—		Have a Good Time
1977	"Love and Happiness"	104	92	—	—	—	—	—	—	—	—		I'm Still in Love with You
1977	"Belle"	83	9	—	—	—	—	—	—	—	—		The Belle Album
1978	"I Feel Good"	103	36	—	—	—	—	—	—	—	—		The Belle Album
1979	"To Sir, with Love" (A-side)	—	71	—	—	—	—	—	—	—	—		Truth n' Time
1979	"Wait Here" (B-side)	—	58	—	—	—	—	—	—	—	—		Truth n' Time
1985	"Never Met Nobody Like You" (UK Only)	—	—	—	—	—	—	—	—	—	—		Trust In God
1985	"Going Away"	—	—	—	—	—	—	—	—	—	—		He Is the Light
1985	"True Love"	—	—	—	—	—	—	—	—	—	—		He Is the Light
1987	"Everything's Gonna Be Alright"	—	22	—	—	—	—	—	—	—	—		Soul Survivor
1987	"You Know and I Know"	—	—	—	—	—	—	—	—	—	—		Soul Survivor
1987	"Soul Survivor"	—	—	—	—	—	—	—	—	—	—		Soul Survivor
1988	"Put a Little Love in Your Heart" (with Annie Lennox)	9	—	2	6	4	2	20	9	7	28		Scrooged Soundtrack
1989	"As Long as We're Together"	—	15	—	—	—	—	—	—	—	—		I Get Joy
1989	"The Message Is Love" (with Arthur Baker)	—	84	—	46	4	—	6	12	10	38		Merge
1991	"Leave the Guns at Home" (with Arthur Baker)	—	69	—	—	—	—	—	—	—	—		Give in to the Rhythm
1992	"Love Is Reality" (US promo)	—	55	—	—	—	—	—	—	—	—		Love Is Reality
1993	"Love Is a Beautiful Thing"	—	34	—	—	—	—	57	—	—	56		Don't Look Back
1994	"Waiting On You"	—	81	—	—	—	—	—	—	—	84		Don't Look Back
1994	"Keep On Pushing Love"	—	—	—	—	—	—	—	—	—	—		Don't Look Back
1994	"Funny How Time Slips Away" (with Lyle Lovett)	—	—	—	—	—	—	—	—	—	—		Rhythm, Country and Blues
1995	"Your Heart's in Good Hands" (US promo)	—	47	—	—	—	—	—	—	—	—		Your Heart's in Good Hands
1995	"Could This Be the Love" (US promo)	—	—	—	—	—	—	—	—	—	—		Your Heart's in Good Hands
2003	"Put It on Paper" (with Ann Nesby)	—	44	—	—	—	—	—	—	—	—		Put It on Paper
2003	"Love Iz" (with Erick Sermon)	—	80	—	—	—	—	—	—	—	—		React
2003	"I Can't Stop"	—	97	—	—	—	—	—	99	—	—		I Can't Stop
2005	"Perfect to Me"	—	115	—	—	—	—	—	—	—	—		Everything's OK
2008	"Stay with Me (By the Sea)" (with John Legend)	—	49	—	—	—	—	—	—	—	—		Lay It Down
2008	"Lay It Down"	—	111	—	—	—	—	—	—	—	—		Lay It Down
2008	"Take Your Time" (with Corinne Bailey Rae)	—	122	—	—	—	—	—	—	—	—		Lay It Down
2018	"Before the Next Teardrop Falls"	—	—	—	—	—	—	—	—	—	—		Non-album single
2023	"Perfect Day"	—	—	—	—	—	—	—	—	—	—		Non-album single
2024	"Everybody Hurts"	—	—	—	—	—	—	—	—	—	—		Non-album single
"—" denotes a recording that did not chart or was not released in that territory.

- ^{B} Single credited to Al Greene & the Soul Mates.
- ^{C} Single credited to Al Greene.

== Movie/television soundtracks ==
- "A Change Is Gonna Come" appears in the film Ali. The original was written and sung by Sam Cooke, however Green recorded a live version for the film which is played when Muhammad Ali - played by Will Smith - learns of the death of close friend Malcolm X.
- "Here I Am" was featured in the movie, The Hitchhiker's Guide to the Galaxy.
- "How Can You Mend a Broken Heart" was featured in the movies, Notting Hill, Good Will Hunting, Sex and the City, The Virgin Suicides and The Book of Eli, as well as the television series, Ally McBeal.
- "Let's Stay Together" was used in the soundtrack of the movies, Pulp Fiction (1994), Love Don't Cost a Thing (2003), and Hellboy (2005).
- "Love Is a Beautiful Thing" was featured in the movies, The Pallbearer (1996), Legally Blonde (2001), Sorority Boys (2002) and Two Weeks Notice (2002).
- "Tired of Being Alone" was featured in the movies, Dead Presidents (1995) and Love Don't Cost a Thing (2003).
- "Love and Happiness" has been featured in several different movies: Menace II Society (1993), Gunmen (1994) Dead Presidents (1995), Love and Basketball (2000), Madea's Family Reunion (2006) and The Nice Guys (2016), as well as television series: House M.D. ("Clueless"; season 2, episode 15) and Fringe ("Inner Child"; season 1, episode 15).

== Other ==
In 2009, Al Green, along with Heather Headley, released a version of the song "People Get Ready" on the compilation album, Oh Happy Day.

In 2011, Time Life released his March 3, 1973 Soul Train performance of "Love and Happiness" on The Best of Soul Train Live.

On March 27, 2026, Raye released her album This Music May Contain Hope. Al Green features on "Goodbye Henry".
