= Look What You Done for Me =

Single by Al Green

from the album I'm Still in Love with You
- B-side: "La-La for You"
- Released: March 1972
- Recorded: 1972
- Genre: Soul
- Length: 3:05
- Label: Hi Records
- Songwriter(s): Al Green, Al Jackson Jr., Willie Mitchell
- Producer(s): Willie Mitchell

Al Green singles chronology
"Let's Stay Together" (1971)	"Look What You Done for Me" (1972)	"I'm Still in Love with You" (1972)

"Look What You Done for Me" is a 1972 song by Al Green, the first single released from his album I'm Still in Love with You. The song reached #4 on the Billboard Hot 100 and #2 on the Hot Soul Singles chart. It was certified as a gold record by the Recording Industry Association of America.

== Composition and recording ==
Green wrote the song on his own, though Al Jackson Jr. and Green's producer Willie Mitchell received co-writing credits. Along with the usual horn section, the production features a string arrangement by James Mitchell and Charles Chalmers.

== Chart performance ==
The song was released by Hi Records as a single in March 1972 (catalog number 45-2211), in advance of the album I'm Still in Love with You. The B-side was "La-La for You," from Green's previous album, Let's Stay Together. At the time of the single's release, "Let's Stay Together," Green's first number-one single, was still on the charts. Billboard ranked it as the No. 55 song for 1972.

Having sold more than 500,000 copies, the record received a gold certification by the Recording Industry Association of America. It was Green's third consecutive gold record, after "Tired of Being Alone" and "Let's Stay Together."

Charts	Peak position
U.S. Billboard Hot 100	4
U.S. Billboard Hot Soul Singles	2
