= Al Green's Greatest Hits, Volume II =

Greatest hits album by Al Green
- Released: 1977
- Genre: Soul
- Label: Hi
- Producer: Willie Mitchell

Al Green chronology
Have a Good Time (1976)	Al Green's Greatest Hits, Volume II (1977)	The Belle Album (1977)

Professional ratings
Review scores
Source	Rating
AllMusic	4.5/5 stars
Christgau's Record Guide	A−
The Rolling Stone Record Guide	5/5 stars

Al Green's Greatest Hits, Volume II is the second Al Green best of compilation album, released in 1977. It peaked at number 134 on the Billboard 200.

== Track listing ==
1. "Love and Happiness" – 5:00
2. "Sha La La (Make Me Happy)" – 2:56
3. "Take Me to the River" – 3:43
4. "L-O-V-E (Love)" – 3:03
5. "Rhymes" – 3:33
6. "For the Good Times" – 6:27
7. "Keep Me Cryin'" – 3:06
8. "Livin' for You" – 3:09
9. "Full of Fire" – 5:12
