= Quiet Elegance =

American female singing group

- Origin: Detroit, Michigan, United States
- Genres: Soul, Southern soul, R&B
- Years active: 1971–1977
- Label: Hi Records

Quiet Elegance was an American female singing group founded in Detroit, Michigan, United States, in 1971. The group toured extensively as backing singers and also recorded a number of Soul and Southern soul music singles during the 1970s. Two albums of their songs were released after they disbanded in 1977.

== Background ==
Quiet Elegance comprised Mildred "Millie" Vaney, Lois Reeves, who is the sister of Martha Reeves, and Frances Yvonne "Frankie" Gearing. Mildred Vaney was also known as Mildred Scott. Both Gearing and Vaney had previously sung with The Glories, and Vaney had also sung with the Pilgrim Female Gospel Singers, The Sermonettes and the jazz group Bobby Dilworth & the Blazers. Gearing was the lead singer of the group and as well as her work with The Glories had previously also sung with the Laddins and the Steinways. Gearing's brother is the late guitarist Johnny Starr, who worked with Jackie Wilson and Little Richard.

== Active years ==
The group were managed by and toured with The Temptations, with Gearing being engaged to the Temptations' Dennis Edwards. In 1972, while appearing with The Temptations in Memphis, Tennessee, they were spotted by Willie Mitchell who signed them to Hi Records, based in Memphis. While with Hi Records they were managed and produced by Willie Mitchell and Dan Greer and toured with Al Green as a backing group. They also toured globally with Tom Jones and Engelbert Humperdinck. Between 1972 and 1977 the group recorded a number of singles for Hi Records. The single "You've Got My Mind Messed Up" peaked at number 54 on Billboard's R&B singles chart in 1973.

Quiet Elegance disbanded in 1977 when their contract with Hi Records came to an end. Lois Reeves re-joined her sister Martha as one of the Vandellas. Vaney went on to perform as one half of Cut Glass, the other half being Ortheia Barnes, sister of J. J. Barnes. She surfaced later in the 1980s as Millie Scott and released a number of singles and two albums on the 4th & Broadway label. Gearing made some solo recordings with Beale Street Records in 1978, shortly after leaving Hi Records. She then returned to her home town of St Petersburg and worked full-time, but continued singing in the clubs and concert halls there, as well as acting as a carer to her ailing grandmother and mother. She also took to acting, and appeared in The Best Little Whorehouse in Texas, playing Miss Mona's maid.

== Recordings ==
Quiet Elegance recorded eight singles for Hi Records, including a promo single. All the singles the group had made, along with some additional songs written by Dan Greer, were released as an album entitled You've Got My Mind Messed Up in 1990. The album consisted of sixteen tracks and was later reworked and released in 2001 and again in 2003 as The Complete Quiet Elegance, consisting of the same sixteen tracks plus some bonus tracks and alternative mixes. The 2001 release consisted of 19 tracks and the 2003 release consisted of 21 tracks. Both albums include songs written by Al Green, including a version of "Tired of Being Alone", which had been a major hit for Green in 1971. As well as these two albums, Quiet Elegance are to be found on a number of soul music compilations.

== Discography ==
All Hi Records releases:

=== Singles ===
- 1972: "I'm Afraid of Losing You" / "Do You Love Me"
- 1972: "I Need Love" / "Mama Said"
- 1973: "I Need Love" / "You've Got My Mind Messed Up"
- 1974: "Love Will Make You Feel Better" (promo single, 7-inch)
- 1975: "Your Love Is Strange" / "Love Will Make You Feel Better"
- 1975: "Have You Been Making Out O.K."
- 1976: "Something That You Got (Sho Nuff Makes Me Hot)" / "After You"
- 1977: "Roots of Love" / "How's Your Love Life"

=== Albums ===
- 1990: You've Got My Mind Messed Up
- 2001: The Complete Quiet Elegance
- 2003: The Complete Quiet Elegance (re-issue with additional tracks)

== Bibliography ==
- Bogdanov, Vladimir; Bush, John; Woodstra, Chris; Erlewine, Stephen Thomas (2005). All Music Guide to Soul. San Francisco: Backbeat Books. ISBN 0-87930-744-7.
- Tee, Ralph (1991). Who's Who in Soul Music. London: Weidenfeld & Nicolson. ISBN 0-297-81081-2.
