= Everything's OK (album) =

Studio album by Al Green
- Released: March 14, 2005
- Recorded: June–September, 2004
- Studio: Royal, Memphis, Tennessee
- Genre: Soul, rhythm and blues
- Length: 48:56
- Label: Blue Note
- Producer: Willie Mitchell, Al Green

Al Green chronology
I Can't Stop (2003)	Everything's OK (2005)	Lay It Down (2008)

Everything's OK is the 28th studio album by American R&B singer Al Green (credited on the cover art and track credits of this album as "The Reverend Al Green"), produced by Willie Mitchell and Green, and released in the UK on March 14, 2005, and a day later in the US on March 15 on the Blue Note label. The album peaked at No. 19 on the R&B chart and No. 50 on the pop chart, Green's first album to place in the pop top 50 since 1975.

== Reception ==
Professional ratings
Review scores
Source	Rating
AllMusic	4/5 stars
The Guardian	3/5 stars
PopMatters	6/10 stars
Rolling Stone	4/5 stars

Everything's OK was positively received by critics and has a favorable Metacritic rating of 76/100, based on 11 reviews. Critics noted that in comparison with the previous I Can't Stop, Everything's OK contained fewer conscious nods towards Green's 1970s Hi Records heyday and had a more contemporary overall sound. In a very enthusiastic review in Rolling Stone, David Wild wrote "I Can't Stop was impressive, but something was missing. Everything's OK is something else entirely. This time...the tunes (are) top-notch. Everything's OK is...one more righteous, red-hot reason to treasure this surviving genius of soul", while AllMusic's Tim Sendra said, "Consider I Can't Stop the rehab assignment in Triple A, while Everything's OK is the home run Green fans have been dreaming about. Writing in The Guardian, Betty Clarke stated, "This is classic Green. To Mitchell's lush 1970s sound, with its bluesy horns and sexy strings, Green adds his ageless falsetto and rumbling sensuality." PopMatters' David Marchese noted, "The groovier songs will put a glide in your stride and a dip in your hip, but it's the ballads that'll make you hit the repeat button. This is an album of old pros doing what they do best, and the ballads give them the best setting to do it in."

== Track listing ==
1. "Everything's OK" (Al Green, Willie Mitchell) - 4:12
2. "You Are So Beautiful" (Bruce Fisher, Billy Preston) - 3:34
3. "Build Me Up" (Green, Mitchell) - 3:50
4. "Perfect to Me" (Green, Mitchell) - 4:09
5. "Nobody But You" (Green, Mitchell) - 3:30
6. "Real Love" (Green) - 5:22
7. "I Can Make Music" (Green, Steve Potts, Leroy Hodges, Lester Snell, Charles "Skip" Pitts, Bobby Manuel, Robert Clayborne) - 4:40
8. "Be My Baby" (Green) - 3:16
9. "Magic Road" (Green) - 3:43
10. "I Wanna Hold You" (Green) - 3:40
11. "Another Day" (Green) - 3:19
12. "All the Time" (Green, Manuel) - 4:01

== Personnel ==
- Al Green – lead vocals, backing vocals
- Lester Snell – acoustic piano
- Robert Clayborne – organ
- Bobby Manuel – guitars
- Charles "Skip" Pitts – guitars
- Leroy Hodges – bass
- Steve Potts – drums, percussion
- Hector Diaz – congas, percussion
- Bobby Rush – harmonica
- Jim Spake – baritone saxophone
- Andrew Love – tenor saxophone
- Lannie McMillan – tenor saxophone
- Bill Florez – bass trombone
- Jack Hale – trombone
- Scott Thompson – trumpet
- Jonathan Kirkscey and Peter Spurbeck – cello
- Anthony Gilbert and Beth Luscombe – viola
- Joan Gilbert, Daniel Gilbert, Gregory Morris and Liza Zurlinden – violin
- Charlie Chalmers – backing vocals
- Donna Rhodes – backing vocals
- Sandra Rhodes – backing vocals

== Charts ==
Chart (2005)	Peak position
US Billboard 200	50
US Top R&B/Hip-Hop Albums (Billboard)	19
