= I Get Joy =

Studio album by Al Green
- Released: May 1989
- Studios: Royal, Ardent, and Colton Row (Memphis, Tennessee); Cheshire (Atlanta, Georgia).
- Genres: Soul, gospel
- Label: A&M
- Producers: Al Green, Paul Zaleski, Eban Kelly, John Randolph

Al Green chronology
Soul Survivor (1987)	I Get Joy (1989)	Love Is Reality (1992)

I Get Joy is a studio album by Al Green, released in 1989 on A&M Records. Green included many secular songs on the album, the first time he had done so since the 1970s.

== Production ==
Green wrote the majority of the songs. "As Long as We're Together" features Al B. Sure! singing backup. Former Tempree Jasper "Jabbo" Phillips sings backup on "Tryin' to Do the Best I Can" and "Tryin' to Get Over You".

== Critical reception ==
Professional ratings
Review scores
Source	Rating
AllMusic	3/5 stars
Robert Christgau	B+
The Encyclopedia of Popular Music	2/5 stars
Hi-Fi News & Record Review	A:1*
The Rolling Stone Album Guide	3.5/5 stars

Robert Christgau wrote: "What distinguishes this exercise is unflinching formal exposition--no Supremes or James Taylor ringers. Even the electrofunk belongs." The Deseret News thought that Green "has a knack for writing songs that are subtle enough to work on both romantic and religious levels." The Los Angeles Times opined that "Green should stick to what he does best, which, these days, is religious music." The New York Times called Green's voice "the sound of a lone supplicant, gently testifying to the comforts of faith."

== Track listing ==
1. "You're Everything to Me" (Al Green, Denise Flippen) - 4:13
2. "All My Praise" (Green, Flippen) - 4:10
3. "The End Is Near" (Green, Flippen) - 4:06
4. "Mighty Clouds of Joy" (Buddy Buie, Robert Nix) - 4:16
5. "I Get Joy" (Green, Flippen) - 3:53
6. "As Long as We're Together" (Green)- 3:44
7. "Praise Him" (Green) - 3:06
8. "Blessed" (Eban Kelly, Jimi Randolph) - 4:06
9. "Tryin' to Do the Best I Can" (Green) - 3:03
10. "Tryin' to Get Over You" (Green) - 2:04

== Personnel ==
- Al Green – lead vocals, arrangements (1–7, 9, 10), backing vocals (6, 8)
- Lester Snell – keyboards (1, 2, 3, 5, 7)
- Wayne Perkins – acoustic piano (4), lead guitar (4)
- Lawrence Mitchell – keyboards (6), horns (6)
- Jimi Randolph – all instruments (8), arrangements (8)
- Johnny Brown – acoustic piano (9), organ (10)
- Angelo Earl – guitars (1, 2, 3, 5, 7)
- Gregory McIntosh – lead guitar (9, 10)
- Jimi Kinnard – bass (1, 2, 3, 5, 7)
- George Jouringan – bass (4, 9, 10)
- Archie Mitchell – drums (1, 2, 3, 5, 6, 7), bass (6)
- Tim Dancy – drums (10)
- Dennis Bates – horns (9)
- Berton Brown – backing vocals (1, 2, 3, 5, 7)
- William Brown III – backing vocals (1, 2, 3, 5, 7)
- Gloria Robinson – backing vocals (1, 2, 3, 5, 7)
- Harvey Jones – backing vocals (4, 9, 10)
- Linda Jones – backing vocals (4, 9, 10)
- Monique Monan – backing vocals (4)
- Reba Russell – backing vocals (4)
- Michael Allen – backing vocals (6)
- Denise Flippen – backing vocals (6)
- John Benton – backing vocals (8)
- Berkley Buckley – backing vocals (8)
- Eban Kelly – backing vocals (8), arrangements (8)
- P. Leon Thomas – backing vocals (8)
- Jasper "Jabbo" Phillips – backing vocals (9, 10)

Production

- Al Green – executive producer, producer, engineer
- Paul Zeleski – producer
- Eban Kelly – producer (8), assistant engineer (8)
- Jimi Randolph – producer (8), engineer (8)
- William Brown III – engineer
- Willie Mitchell – engineer
- Robert Nix – engineer (4)
- Kim Venable – engineer (4)
- John Eberle – mastering
- Chuck Beeson – art direction, design
- Jeff Gold – art direction
- Howard Rosenberg – photography
