= I'm Still in Love with You (Al Green album) =

Studio album by Al Green
- Released: October 23, 1972 (original); 1993 (reissue)
- Recorded: 1972
- Studios: Royal, Memphis, Tennessee
- Genre: Soul
- Length: 34:59
- Labels: Hi (original); The Right Stuff (reissue)
- Producer: Willie Mitchell

Al Green chronology
Let's Stay Together (1972)	I'm Still in Love with You (1972)	Call Me (1973)

Singles from I'm Still in Love with You
- 1. "Look What You Done for Me" Released: March 1972; 2. "I'm Still in Love with You" Released: June 1972; 3. "Love and Happiness" Released: November 1972

Professional ratings
Review scores
Source	Rating
AllMusic	5/5 stars
And It Don't Stop	A
Blender	5/5 stars
Christgau's Record Guide	A−
Pitchfork Media	9.4/10
Rolling Stone (1972)	(favorable)
Rolling Stone (2003)	5/5 stars

I'm Still in Love with You is the fifth studio album by the American gospel and soul singer Al Green, released on October 23, 1972, by Hi Records. The recording sessions took place during 1972. The album was produced by Willie Mitchell. It peaked at number four on the US Billboard 200 and number one on the US Top R&B/Hip-Hop Albums and produced four singles: "Love and Happiness" which was rated 98 on Rolling Stone's 500 Greatest Songs of All Time as well as "I'm Still in Love with You" and "Look What You Done for Me" which were top five hits on the US Pop Chart. In 2003, the album was ranked number 285 on the 500 greatest albums of all time by Rolling Stone, 286 in a 2012 revised list, and number 306 in a 2020 revised list. The introductory drum break to the album's second track, "I'm Glad You're Mine", has been sampled over 200 times by other recording artists, notably in The Notorious B.I.G.'s posthumous single "Dead Wrong" featuring Eminem.

== Track listing ==
LP: Side one
No.	Title	Writer(s)	Length
1.	"I'm Still in Love with You"	Al Green, Al Jackson Jr., Willie Mitchell	3:12
2.	"I'm Glad You're Mine"	Al Green	2:57
3.	"Love and Happiness"	Al Green, Teenie Hodges	5:07
4.	"What a Wonderful Thing Love Is"	Al Green	3:40
5.	"Simply Beautiful"	Al Green	4:11
Total length:			19:07

LP: Side two
No.	Title	Writer(s)	Length
1.	"Oh, Pretty Woman"	Bill Dees, Roy Orbison	3:23
2.	"For the Good Times"	Kris Kristofferson	6:27
3.	"Look What You Done for Me"	Al Green, Al Jackson, Jr., Willie Mitchell	3:05
4.	"One of These Good Old Days"	Al Green	3:24
Total length:			16:19

2002 CD bonus tracks
No.	Title	Length
10.	"I Think It's For The Feeling"	4:26
11.	"Up Above My Head"	2:59
Total length:		42:51

== Personnel ==
- Pam Brady – assistant
- Tom Cartwright – project director
- Charles Chalmers – arranger, horn arrangements, string arrangements, backing vocals
- Robert Gordon – liner notes
- Al Green – lead vocals
- Howard Grimes – drums, rhythm section
- Jack Hale, Sr. – horn section, trombone
- Charles Hodges – drums, organ, piano
- Leroy Hodges – bass
- Mabon "Teenie" Hodges – guitar
- Al Jackson Jr. – drums
- Wayne Jackson – horn section, trumpet
- Ed Logan – tenor horn, tenor saxophone
- Andrew Love – tenor horn, tenor saxophone
- James Mitchell – string and horn arrangements, tenor horn, baritone saxophone
- Willie Mitchell – engineer, producer
- Eli Okun – reissue producer
- Bud O'Shea – reissue producer
- Cheryl Pawelski – assistant
- Donna Rhodes – backing vocals
- Sandra Rhodes aka Sandra Chalmers – backing vocals
- Larry Walsh – mastering
- Pete Welding – assistant

== Charts ==
Chart (1972)	Peak position
US Billboard 200	4
US R&B Albums	1

== Certifications ==
Country	Award	Sales/shipments
United States (RIAA)	Platinum	1,000,000^{^}
^{^}Indicated shipments

== See also ==
- List of Billboard number-one R&B albums of 1972
