= I Can't Stop (album) =

Studio album by Al Green
- Released: November 17, 2003
- Recorded: March–April 2003
- Studio: Royal, Memphis, Tennessee
- Genre: Soul
- Length: 53:11
- Label: Blue Note
- Producer: Willie Mitchell

Al Green chronology
Feels Like Christmas (2001)	I Can't Stop (2003)	Everything's OK (2005)

Singles from I Can't Stop
- 1. "I Can't Stop" Released: 2003

I Can't Stop is the 27th studio album by American soul singer Al Green. It was released by Blue Note Records on November 17, 2003, in the United Kingdom and on November 18 in the United States. Produced by Willie Mitchell, the album was Green's first since 1995, his first for Blue Note, and his first collaboration with Mitchell since 1985's He Is the Light; it was also Green's first entirely secular recording since the 1970s.

The reunion between Green and Mitchell was highly anticipated and I Can't Stop was a commercial success, peaking at number 53 on the US Billboard 200 and number 9 on the Top R&B/Hip-Hop Albums charts. It was Green's highest placing on both charts since his 1975 album Al Green Is Love. The album was nominated for the 2004 Grammy Award for Best R&B Album, while its title track also received a nod in the Best Traditional R&B Performance category.

== Critical reception ==
Professional ratings
Review scores
Source	Rating
AllMusic	3.5/5 stars
The Austin Chronicle	3.5/5 stars
Blender	2/5 stars
Entertainment Weekly	A−
The Guardian	4/5 stars
Mojo	4/5 stars
Q	4/5 stars
Rolling Stone	3.5/5 stars
Uncut	4/5 stars
The Village Voice	A−

I Can't Stop received generally positive reviews from music critics. At Metacritic, it received an average score of 75 out of 100, based on 18 reviews. Mojo opined "(Green) is, if anything, singing better than ever". In The Guardian, Alexis Petridis stated "The songwriting is largely superb, which keeps the album from sounding like a clever pastiche". Robert Christgau, writing in The Village Voice, said that the album is not a sophisticated modernization or comeback to "a form he never lost", but instead shows that Green has "retained plenty of voice and the guile to know what to do with it." In a mixed review, Tom Smucker of The Village Voice felt that Green gets "tied down when production's slathered on a bit too thick". Blender dismissed it as "a weak echo of those gloriously clean and spacious [1970s] LPs".

In a retrospective review for the magazine, Christgau gave the album four stars and called it Green's "finest late pop album". He felt that, although Green "can no longer shade with sprightly delicacy," his singing is louder and strengthened by "two decades in the pulpit at his own Memphis church."

== Track listing ==
- All tracks written by Al Green and Willie Mitchell except where noted.
1. "I Can't Stop" - 3:48
2. "Play to Win" - 4:38
3. "Rainin' in My Heart" - 4:45*
4. "I've Been Waitin' on You" (Green) - 3:43
5. "You" - 4:29
6. "Not Tonight" - 4:25
7. "Million to One" - 4:52
8. "My Problem Is You" - 6:28
9. "I'd Still Choose You" - 4:05
10. "I've Been Thinkin' 'Bout You" (Green) - 4:04
11. "I'd Write a Letter" (Green) - 3:53
12. "Too Many" (Green) - 4:01
- "Rainin' in My Heart" is a new song written by Green & Mitchell for this album. Certain song databases have mistakenly classified Green's song as a cover of Slim Harpo's "Rainin' in My Heart", written by James Moore (aka Slim Harpo) and Jerry West (aka J.D. Miller). The lyrics to the two songs are completely unrelated except for the title.

== Personnel and credits ==
=== Musicians ===
- Al Green – lead vocals, backing vocals (9–12)
- Lester Snell – Fender Rhodes (1), acoustic piano (2, 3, 4, 6–12), organ (5)
- Willie Mitchell – Wurlitzer electric piano (1), arrangements
- Robert Clayborne – organ (1–4, 6–12), acoustic piano (5)
- Mabon "Teenie" Hodges – guitars
- Charles "Skip" Pitts – guitars (2–12), guitar solo (10)
- Leroy Hodges – bass
- Steve Potts – drums, congas, percussion
- Charles Chalmers – backing vocals
- Donna Rhodes – backing vocals
- Sandra Rhodes –backing vocals

The Royal Horns

- Arranged by Willie Mitchell and Lester Snell
- Jim Spake – baritone saxophone
- Andrew Love – tenor saxophone
- Lannie McMillan – tenor saxophone, flute (1), clarinet (12)
- Jack Hale – trombone
- Scott Thompson – trumpet

The New Memphis Strings

- Arranged by Willie Mitchell and Lester Snell
- Orchestrated by Lester Snell
- Jonathan Kirkscey and Peter Spurbeck – cello
- Anthony Gilbert and Beth Luscombe – viola
- Daniel Gilbert, Joan Gilbert, Gregory Morris and Liza Zurlinden – violin

=== Production ===
- Tom Cartwright – executive producer
- Michael Cuscuna – executive producer
- Willie Mitchell – producer, mixing
- Jason Hohenberg – associate producer
- Lawrence Mitchell – associate producer, production coordinator
- Archie Mitchell – associate producer, engineer, mixing
- Scott Bomar – assistant engineer
- Bernie Grundman – mastering at Bernie Grundman Mastering (Hollywood, California)
- Zach Hochkeppel – product manager
- Gordon H. Jee – creative direction
- Burton Yount – art direction, design
- Clay Patrick McBride – photography
- Evan Ross – stylist

== Charts ==
Chart (2003)	Peak position
Dutch Albums (Album Top 100)	72
French Albums (SNEP)	130
Swedish Albums (Sverigetopplistan)	60
US Billboard 200	53
US Top R&B/Hip-Hop Albums (Billboard)	9
