= Tokyo Live =

Tokyo Live may refer to:

- Tokyo Live (Al Green album), 1981
- Tokyo Live (John McLaughlin album), 1994
- Tokyo Live (Yngwie Malmsteen album), 2025
