= Al Green Gets Next to You =

- Cover art for all editions, including the U.S. vinyl edition (pictured)

Studio album by Al Green
- Released: March 1971 (US)
- Recorded: 1970–71
- Genre: Soul
- Length: 33:19
- Label: Hi
- Producer: Willie Mitchell

Al Green chronology
Green Is Blues (1969)	Al Green Gets Next to You (1971)	Let's Stay Together (1972)

Singles from Al Green Gets Next to You
- 1. "You Say It" Released: 1970; 2. "Right Now, Right Now" Released: 1970; 3. "I Can't Get Next to You" Released: 1970; 4. "Driving Wheel" Released: 1971; 5. "Tired of Being Alone" Released: June 1971

Professional ratings
Review scores
Source	Rating
AllMusic	4.5/5 stars
Blender	5/5 stars
Christgau's Record Guide	A
Rolling Stone	favorable &

Al Green Gets Next to You (alternatively known as Gets Next to You) is the third studio album by American soul singer Al Green, released in March 1971.

== Track listing ==
1. "I Can't Get Next to You" (Barrett Strong, Norman Whitfield) – 3:52
2. "Are You Lonely for Me, Baby?" (Bert Berns) – 4:02
3. "God Is Standing By" (Johnny Taylor) – 3:14
4. "Tired of Being Alone" (Al Green) – 2:43
5. "I'm a Ram" (Green, Mabon "Teenie" Hodges) – 3:53
6. "Driving Wheel" (Roosevelt Sykes) – 3:04
7. "Light My Fire" (Robby Krieger, Jim Morrison, Ray Manzarek, John Densmore) – 3:59
8. "You Say It" (Al Green) – 2:57
9. "Right Now, Right Now" (Al Green) – 2:53
10. "All Because" (Al Green) – 2:42
11. "Ride, Sally Ride" – (bonus track)
12. "True Love" – (bonus track)
13. "I'll Be Standing By" – (bonus track)

Editions of the album released outside North America include four extra tracks from Green's previous album Green is Blues, which had not been released in those territories: side A adds "My Girl" and "Get Back" after "I'm a Ram", side B adds "The Letter" and "One Woman" after "All Because".
