= I Can't Get Next to You =

1969 single by the Temptations

Single by the Temptations

from the album Puzzle People
- B-side: "Running Away (Ain't Gonna Help You)"
- Released: July 30, 1969
- Recorded: Hitsville USA (Studio A); June 23, June 24, June 27, June 30, July 2, and July 3, 1969
- Genre: Funk, psychedelic soul
- Length: 2:51
- Label: Gordy; G 7093
- Songwriters: Norman Whitfield; Barrett Strong
- Producer: Norman Whitfield

The Temptations singles chronology
| "Don't Let the Joneses Get You Down" (1969) | "I Can't Get Next to You" (1969) | "The Weight" (1969) |

"I Can't Get Next to You"

Single by Al Green

from the album Al Green Gets Next to You
- Released: November 1970
- Recorded: Memphis, Tennessee; 1970
- Genre: R&B
- Length: 3:48
- Label: Hi; 2182
- Songwriters: Norman Whitfield; Barrett Strong
- Producer: Willie Mitchell

Al Green singles chronology
| "Right Now, Right Now" (1970) | "I Can't Get Next to You" (1970) | "Driving Wheel" (1971) |

"I Can't Get Next to You" is a 1969 single recorded by the Temptations and written by Norman Whitfield and Barrett Strong for the Gordy (Motown) label. The song was a No. 1 single on the Billboard Top Pop Singles chart for two weeks in 1969, from October 18 to October 25, replacing "Sugar, Sugar" by the Archies and replaced by "Suspicious Minds" by Elvis Presley. The single was also a No. 1 hit on the Billboard Top R&B Singles for five weeks, from October 4 to November 1, replacing "Oh, What a Night" by the Dells, and replaced by another Motown song, "Baby I'm For Real" by the Originals.

The single was the second of the Temptations' four No. 1 hits on the United States pop charts, and was also one of the best-selling singles the group released. Billboard ranked it as the No. 3 song for 1969.

The applause that starts the song, which is cut short by Dennis Edwards' spoken "Hold it, hold it, listen" line, was sampled in another Temptations song "Psychedelic Shack".

== Overview ==
"I Can't Get Next to You" was the second single from the 1969 Temptations LP Puzzle People, with "Running Away (Ain't Gonna Help You)", a ballad led by Paul Williams, as the b-side. The single was a No. 1 hit on both the Billboard Hot 100 chart and the Billboard Top R&B Singles chart. The song has been frequently covered, most notably a 1970 version by Al Green, a slower-paced version without multi-lead vocals. Green's cover, the title track of his 1971 LP Al Green Gets Next to You, reached No. 60 on the Billboard Hot 100, and No. 11 on the R&B chart. Annie Lennox also covered the song on her 1995 album Medusa.

== Personnel ==
- Lead and background vocals by Dennis Edwards (verses; choruses; outro), Eddie Kendricks (verses; choruses), Paul Williams (verses), Melvin Franklin (verses), and Otis Williams (last verse)
- Written by Norman Whitfield and Barrett Strong
- Produced by Norman Whitfield
- Instrumentation by the Funk Brothers.

== Chart history ==
=== The Temptations ===
| Chart (1969) | Peak position |
|---|---|
| Canada RPM Top Singles | 11 |
| UK | 13 |
| U.S. Billboard Hot 100 | 1 |
| U.S. Billboard R&B | 1 |
| U.S. Cash Box Top 100 | 3 |

==== Year-end charts ====
| Chart (1969) | Rank |
|---|---|
| Canada | 44 |
| US Billboard Hot 100 | 3 |
| US Cash Box | 7 |

==== All-time charts ====
| Chart (1958-2018) | Position |
|---|---|
| US Billboard Hot 100 | 409 |

=== Al Green ===
| Chart (1970–71) | Peak position |
|---|---|
| U.S. Billboard Hot 100 | 60 |
| U.S. Billboard R&B | 11 |
| U.S. Cash Box Top 100 | 70 |

== See also ==
- Hot 100 No. 1 Hits of 1969 (USA)
- R&B number-one hits of 1969 (USA)
