= Higher Plane =

Higher Plane may refer to:

- Higher Plane (album), a 1981 album by Al Green, or the title song
- "Higher Plane" (song), a 1974 song by Kool & the Gang
