= Tokyo Live (Al Green album) =

Live album by Al Green
- Released: 1981
- Recorded: June 23–24, 1978
- Genre: Soul/Gospel
- Length: 76:49
- Label: The Right Stuff Records
- Producer: Kaname Tajima

Al Green chronology
Higher Plane (1981)	Tokyo Live (1981)	Precious Lord (1982)

Professional ratings
Review scores
Source	Rating
Allmusic	4/5 stars

Tokyo Live is a live album by American soul singer Al Green released in 1981 from two June 1978 shows in Tokyo. Band: Recorded live at Nakano Sun Plaza Hall, Tokyo, Japan on June 23 & 24, 1978. Personnel: Al Green (vocals); James Bass, Bernard Staton (guitar); Buddy Jarrett (alto saxophone, background vocals); Ron Echols (tenor & baritone saxophones); Daryl Neeley, Fred Jordan (trumpet); Johnny Brown (keyboards); Reuben Fairfax Jr. (bass); John Toney (drums); Ardis Hardin (percussion); Linda Jones, Margaret Foxworth (background vocals).

== Track listing ==
1. "L-O-V-E (Love)" (Green, Willie Mitchell, Mabon "Teenie" Hodges)
2. "Tired of Being Alone" (Green)
3. "Let's Stay Together" (Green, Willie Mitchell, Al Jackson Jr.)
4. "How Can You Mend a Broken Heart?" (Robin Gibb, Barry Gibb)
5. "All 'n All" (Green, Reuben Fairfax Jr., Fred Jordan)
6. "Belle" (Green, Reuben Fairfax Jr., Fred Jordan)
7. "Sha-La-La (Make Me Happy)" (Green)
8. "Let's Get Married" (Green)
9. Medley: "God Blessed Our Love" (Green, Willie Mitchell, Earl Randle) / "Unchained Melody" (Alex North, Hy Zaret)
10. "You Ought to Be with Me" (Green, Willie Mitchell, Al Jackson Jr.)
11. "For the Good Times" (Kris Kristofferson)
12. "Dream" (Green, Reuben Fairfax Jr., Fred Jordan)
13. "I Feel Good" (Green, Reuben Fairfax Jr., Fred Jordan)
14. "Love and Happiness" (Green, Mabon "Teenie" Hodges)
