= Millie Scott =

American R&B singer

- Born: Savannah, Georgia, U.S.
- Genre: R&B
- Occupation: Singer
- Years active: 1971–1988
- Label: Hi Records

Millie Scott is an American R&B singer who had moderate success in the US Billboard R&B chart during the 1980s.

== Biography ==
Scott was born in Savannah on the coast of Georgia. She first sang gospel, before becoming a jazz singer. After moving to New York, she was enticed to move to Detroit by vocal group The Temptations, and she remains in Detroit to this day.

In 1971, she formed the group Quiet Elegance along with Lois Reeves and Frankie Gearing. They toured with The Temptations and signed to the Hi Records label in 1972, releasing a number of singles. In 1986, she was signed to D&B Productions in Detroit, helmed by Bruce Nazarian, whose recordings led to Scott being signed as a solo artist to Island Records and releasing her debut single, "Prisoner of Love". It peaked at number 52 in the UK Singles Chart in 1986. Follow-up singles "Automatic" and "Ev'ry Little Bit" also charted in the UK.

Scott made numerous appearances on the UK Channel 4 television programme Solid Soul in the mid-1980s, alongside other R&B acts such as Loose Ends and Ruby Turner.

== Discography ==
=== Studio albums ===
Year	Album	US R&B
1987	Love Me Right	57
1988	I Can Make It Good for You	—
"—" denotes the release did not chart.

=== Singles ===
Year	Single	Peak chart positions		
Year	Single	US Dance	US R&B	UK
1986	"Automatic"	—	49	56
1986	"Prisoner of Love"	13	78	52
1987	"Love Me Right"	—	40	—
1987	"Ev'ry Little Bit"	—	11	63
1988	"To the Letter"	—	—	—
1988	"A Love of Your Own"	—	66	—
1988	"It's My Life"	—	90	—
"—" denotes releases that did not chart.
