= The Belle Album =

Studio album by Al Green
- Released: December 6, 1977
- Recorded: 1977
- Genre: Soul
- Length: 39:38
- Label: Hi
- Producer: Al Green

Al Green chronology
Al Green's Greatest Hits, Vol. 2 (1977)	The Belle Album (1977)	Truth N' Time (1978)

The Belle Album is the 12th studio album by soul musician Al Green. It is his first album recorded without longtime producer Willie Mitchell, owner of Green's former label, Hi Records. With Mitchell and his label Green also abandoned the famed Hi Rhythm Section, which had previously played a large part in defining Green's distinctive musical style. This also marks the first instance in which Green plays lead guitar on his records.

The Belle Album is one of the last in a string of secular recordings made by Green; he had recently converted to Christianity and had been ordained as a pastor, and thereafter he began creating gospel records exclusively.

== Critical reception ==
Retrospective professional ratings
Review scores
Source	Rating
AllMusic	4/5 stars
Blender (Jody Rosen)	5/5 stars
Blender (Robert Christgau)	4/5 stars
Christgau's Record Guide	A
Q	4/5 stars
The Rolling Stone Album Guide	4.5/5 stars
The Virgin Encyclopedia of R&B and Soul	4/5 stars

Reviewing the album for The Village Voice, Robert Christgau wrote in January 1978:

This is the most idiosyncratic LP in the top 200. Since 1975 Green has been making albums on which two or three real songs were supplemented by material so vague and unpredictable it almost announced itself as filler improvised in the studio--which is not to say that those of us who love him passionately didn't find much of it hypnotic. Now on a self-produced album focused around his own (frequently acoustic) guitar, the filler comes front and center with new assurance and perhaps even its own formal identity; the real songs themselves--his best in years--sound improvised in the studio. And more than ever, it all holds together around Green's agile rhythm, dynamics, and coloration and his obsession with the soul-body dualism at the heart of the genre he now rules unchallenged.

The following month, Greil Marcus reviewed the album in Rolling Stone. "In rock & roll, nothing seems easier or more obvious than a good beat, but nothing is more elusive", Marcus wrote. "We may someday look back on The Belle Album as Al Green's best — it's too soon to know; the man has a lifetime ahead of him — and if we do, the beat will be the reason. Whether or not the seemingly effortless religious conviction of the songs Green has written for this record lasts as long as he does, the beat will never wear out."

The Globe and Mail noted that Green is "singing better than ever, exchanging a style that relied on slightly-voiced yet emotionally packed howls for a strong, accessible style that opens so many other possibilities for him." The Bay State Banner concluded that "his new song lyrics are somewhat less tortured than the probing questions of his old hits, so that Belle lacks their tension... It's honest, if occasionally paradoxical music."

In 1989, Spin ranked The Belle Album as the 16th greatest record of all time. In 1998, The Wire included The Belle Album in their list of "100 Records That Set the World on Fire (While No One Was Listening)", where the staff described it as "[a] pivotal record for Green, launched from somewhere between Memphis and Valhalla", that fused pop sensibilities with "Pentecostal fire" and which provided "the last gasp of soul passion before the adolescent cool of the post-Jimmy Carter years suffocated the US." They felt that even for 1977's recording standards, the album "sounded like a field recording, especially with Green playing his own lead guitar. But it had real down home power."

== Track listing ==
All songs written by Al Green, Fred Jordan and Reuben Fairfax, Jr.

Side one

1. "Belle" – 4:50
2. "Loving You" – 3:32
3. "Feels Like Summer" – 3:42
4. "Georgia Boy" – 7:01

Side two

1. "I Feel Good" – 5:20
2. "All n All" – 3:39
3. "Chariots of Fire" – 3:50
4. "Dream" – 7:33

== Personnel ==
- Al Green – vocals, acoustic and electric guitar
- Reuben Fairfax, Jr. – bass guitar, bell lyre
- James Bass – electric guitar
- Margaret Foxworth, Linda Jones, Harvey Jones – background vocals
- Purvis Leon Thomas – clavinet, Fender Rhodes piano
- Johnny Brown – acoustic piano, Fender Rhodes piano
- Fred Jordan – Fender Rhodes piano, Roland String Ensemble, Polyphonic Orchestration, trumpet, flugelhorn
- John Toney – drums, Syndrum
- Rob Payne – Syndrum
- Ardis Hardin – drums
- Buddy Jarrett – alto sax
- Darryl Neely – trumpet, flugelhorn
- Ron Echols – tenor and baritone sax
