= Truth n' Time =

Studio album by Al Green
- Released: 1978
- Studio: American Music
- Genre: Soul
- Length: 26:54
- Label: Hi
- Producer: Al Green

Al Green chronology
The Belle Album (1977)	Truth n' Time (1978)	The Lord Will Make a Way (1980)

Truth n' Time is a studio album by the soul singer Al Green, released in 1978. It was Green's last album of mainly secular music for several years.

The album peaked at No. 44 on the Billboard Top R&B/Hip-Hop Albums chart.

== Production ==
Truth n' Time was recorded at Green's American Music studio. Green produced the album.

== Critical reception ==
Professional ratings
Review scores
Source	Rating
AllMusic	2.5/5 stars
Christgau's Record Guide	B+
The Encyclopedia of Popular Music	4/5 stars
The Rolling Stone Album Guide	4/5 stars

The Bay State Banner wrote: "The inclusion of 'To Sir with Love' and 'Say a Little Prayer' can be questioned, but Al stomps and cuts through them just like a thoroughbred racer. Some really tremendous session work also, though minus the quiet excellence of drummer Howard Grimes."

In a 2006 review of a reissue, Rolling Stone stated that Truth n' Time "contains too much filler for an album not even twenty-seven minutes long."

== Track listing ==
1. "Blow Me Down" (Bernard Staton, Carol Staton) - 3:10
2. "Lo and Behold" (Bernard Staton, Fred Jordan) - 3:15
3. "Wait Here" (Green, Reuben Fairfax, Jr., Jordan) - 2:45
4. "To Sir with Love" (Don Black, Mark London) - 4:09
5. "Truth n' Time" (Green) - 3:41
6. "King of All" (Bernard Staton, Carol Staton) - 2:23
7. "I Say a Little Prayer" (Burt Bacharach, Hal David) - 2:13
8. "Happy Days" (Green) - 5:13

== Personnel ==
- Al Green – vocals, lead and rhythm guitar, arrangements
- Bernard Staton, James Bass – guitar
- Brian Batie, Errol Thomas, James Turner – bass
- Fred Jordan, Gary Lax, Jesse Butler, Johnny Brown, Purvis Leon Thomas, Charles Renard Webb – keyboards
- John Toney – drums, percussion
- Ron Echols – tenor and baritone saxophone
- Buddy Jarrett – alto saxophone
- Darryl Neely, Fred Jordan – trumpet
- Buddy Jarrett, Harvey Jones, Linda Jones – backing vocals
- Fred Jordan – engineer
- Kinji Nishimura – photography
