= Livin' for You (song) =

- Portuguese release picture sleeve

Single by Al Green

from the album Livin' for You
- B-side: "It Ain't No Fun to Me"
- Released: December, 1973
- Genre: Soul
- Length: 3:12
- Label: Hi Records
- Songwriter(s): Al Green & Willie Mitchell
- Producer(s): Willie Mitchell

Al Green singles chronology
"Here I Am (Come And Take Me)" (1973)	"Livin' for You" (1973)	"Let's Get Married" (1974)

"Livin' for You" is a song recorded by Al Green and co-written by Green and Willie Mitchell. It was the title track of Green's 1973 album Livin' for You. Released as a single in December of that year, it eventually became Green's fourth single to reach the number one spot on Billboard's R&B Singles Chart, also reached the number nineteen spot on Billboard's Pop Singles Chart. The single was Al Green's first release without the involvement of drummer Al Jackson, Jr., who had reunited with his former group, Booker T. & the MG's.
