= Let's Stay Together (Al Green album) =

Studio album by Al Green
- Released: January 31, 1972
- Studio: Royal Recording, Memphis, Tennessee
- Genre: Soul
- Length: 33:53
- Label: Hi (SH-32070)
- Producer: Willie Mitchell

Al Green chronology
Al Green Gets Next to You (1971)	Let's Stay Together (1972)	I'm Still in Love With You (1972)

Singles from Let's Stay Together
- 1. "Let's Stay Together" Released: December 1971

Let's Stay Together is the fourth studio album by soul singer Al Green. Released on January 31, 1972, as the follow-up to his moderate success, Al Green Gets Next to You, it was recorded at Royal Recording Studio in Memphis, Tennessee. A commercial success, it peaked at number eight on the pop albums chart and became the first of six consecutive Green albums to peak at number one on the soul album chart, where it held the position for ten straight weeks.

Let's Stay Together is best-known for its title track, "Let's Stay Together", which became Green's signature song and his only number-one pop hit single. The third Green album produced by Willie Mitchell, Let's Stay Together marked the beginning of Green's classic period of critically acclaimed albums.

== Critical reaction ==
Professional ratings
Review scores
Source	Rating
AllMusic	5/5 stars
Blender	3/5 stars
Christgau's Record Guide	A−
The Encyclopedia of Popular Music	5/5 stars
Pitchfork Media	8.7/10
Rolling Stone	5/5 stars

The album's appeal was widespread among critics; Rolling Stone noted, "Green's voice is something to marvel at. He can croon, shout, scat, rise to the smoothest falsetto, and throw in the funkiest growls ... Let's Stay Together is, like its predecessor, an indispensable treat."

In 1999, Q wrote that the album "shows him as the authentic voice of love's pain and purity on such wonders as 'How Can You Mend A Broken Heart?'" and that "[H]is cover of the Bee Gees' [song] took the soul ballad to new levels of artistry and refinement."

=== List rankings ===
- Included in Q's "Best Soul Albums of All Time"
- Ranked No. 335 in the Virgin All-Time top 1000 album list
- Ranked No. 608 in the Guinness top 1000 album poll (1994) and No. 25 in the Top 50 Soul Albums list

== Track listing ==
All songs written by Al Green, except where noted

=== Side one ===
1. "Let's Stay Together" (Green, Al Jackson, Jr., Willie Mitchell) – 3:18
2. "La-La for You" (Green, Mitchell) – 3:31
3. "So You're Leaving" – 2:57
4. "What Is This Feeling" – 3:42
5. "Old Time Lovin'" – 3:19

=== Side two ===
1. "I've Never Found a Girl (Who Loves Me Like You Do)" (Eddie Floyd, Alvertis Isbell, Booker T. Jones) – 3:41
2. "How Can You Mend a Broken Heart" (Barry Gibb, Robin Gibb) – 6:22
3. "Judy" – 3:47
4. "It Ain't No Fun to Me" – 3:23

=== Reissue tracks ===
Bonus tracks on 2003 reissue

- "Eli's Game" – 4:55
- "Listen to Me" (Traditional) – 2:30

== Personnel ==
Rhythm section (the Hi Rhythm Section)

- Howard Grimes – drums
- Al Jackson Jr. – drums
- Leroy Hodges – bass guitar
- Charles Hodges – organ, piano
- Teenie Hodges – guitar

Horn section

- Wayne Jackson – trumpet
- Andrew Love – horn, tenor saxophone
- Ed Logan – horn, tenor saxophone
- James Mitchell – bass, baritone saxophone, arrangements
- Jack Hale, Sr. – trombone

Vocals

- Al Green – vocals
- Charles Chalmers, Donna Rhodes, Sandra Rhodes – background vocals, arrangements

Additional personnel

- Willie Mitchell – producer, engineer
- Willie Mitchell & Terry Manning – mixing engineers
- Peter Rynston – mastering engineer
- Jools DeVere – artwork
- Bud Lee – photography

== See also ==
- List of Billboard number-one R&B albums of 1972

== Bibliography ==
- Let's Stay Together album liner notes by Colin Escott. Cream / Hi Records, Inc.
