= Tired of Being Alone =

1971 single by Al Green

- Side-A label of original 1971 edition

Single by Al Green

from the album Al Green Gets Next to You
- B-side: "Get Back Baby" (US); "Right Now, Right Now" (UK)
- Released: June 1971
- Recorded: 1971
- Genre: Soul
- Length: 2:43
- Label: Hi
- Songwriter: Al Green
- Producer: Willie Mitchell

Al Green singles chronology
"Driving Wheel" (1971)	"Tired of Being Alone" (1971)	"Let's Stay Together" (1971)

"Tired of Being Alone" is a soul song written by American singer Al Green. It reached number 11 on the US Billboard Hot 100 and number seven on the Soul Singles Chart in 1971. Billboard ranked it as the number 12 song for 1971.

== Background ==
Though released on the 1971 album, Al Green Gets Next to You, the song was written in late 1968 and intended to be released on the 1969 album, Green Is Blues. Problems occurred with the first recording, so it was postponed for production. It was altered and perfected the second time around.

"Tired of Being Alone" was produced and recorded by Willie Mitchell at Hi Records and mixed by Mitchell and Terry Manning. In 1973, Green performed the song with Chicago on the TV special Chicago in the Rockies. In 2002, this recording appeared as a bonus track on the remastered version of Chicago VI.

In 2004, Green's version was ranked number 293 on Rolling Stone's list of The 500 Greatest Songs of All Time.

== Charts ==
Chart (1971)	Peak position
UK Singles (OCC)	4
US Billboard Hot 100	11
US Best Selling Soul Singles (Billboard)	7

== Certifications ==
Region	Certification	Certified units/sales
New Zealand (RMNZ)	Platinum	30,000^{‡}
United Kingdom (BPI)	Gold	400,000^{‡}
United States (RIAA)	Gold	1,000,000^{^}
^{^} Shipments figures based on certification alone.^{‡} Sales+streaming figures based on certification alone.

== Texas version ==
"Tired of Being Alone"

Single by Texas
- B-side: "Wrapped in Clothes of Blue"
- Released: April 13, 1992
- Length: 3:17 (single version); 3:28 (The Greatest Hits version)
- Label: Phonogram
- Songwriter: Al Green
- Producers: Texas, Kenny MacDonald

Texas singles chronology
"Mothers Heaven" (remix) (1992)	"Tired of Being Alone" (1992)	"So Called Friend" (1993)

In 1992, Scottish band Texas covered "Tired of Being Alone". Their version became a hit in the United Kingdom, reaching number 19 on the UK Singles Chart. A re-recorded version later appeared on their 2000 album, The Greatest Hits.

=== Track listings ===
- 7-inch single
1. "Tired of Being Alone" – 3:17
2. "Wrapped in Clothes of Blue" – 4:18
- CD1
1. "Tired of Being Alone" – 3:17
2. "Thrill Has Gone" – 4:25
3. "In My Heart" (12") – 6:36
4. "Prayer for You" – 6:51
- CD2 Acoustic EP
1. "Tired of Being Alone" – 3:02
2. "Walk the Dust" – 5:11
3. "Why Believe in You" – 3:32
4. "Return" – 2:34

Note: Limited edition of 5000 copies (in oversized packaging), includes three exclusive black and white postcards.

=== Charts ===
Chart (1992)	Peak position
Australia (ARIA)	173
Europe (Eurochart Hot 100)	60
UK Singles (Official Charts)	19
UK Airplay (Music Week)	11

=== Release history ===
Region	Date	Format(s)	Label(s)	Ref.
United Kingdom	April 13, 1992	7-inch vinyl; CD; cassette	Mercury	
Australia	June 29, 1992	CD; cassette	Mercury	

== Other noteworthy versions ==
- "Tired of Being Alone" has been covered by other artists. Among the more successful is American singer Sybil who released the song as a non-album single in 1996, peaking at number 53 in the UK.
