= Green Is Blues =

- Original 1969 vinyl edition

Studio album by Al Green
- Released: April 15, 1969
- Recorded: 1968–69
- Genre: Soul
- Length: 28:49 (original edition); 40:42 (40th anniversary edition)
- Label: Hi
- Producer: Willie Mitchell

Al Green chronology
Back Up Train (1967)	Green Is Blues (1969)	Al Green Gets Next to You (1971)

Professional ratings
Review scores
Source	Rating
AllMusic	3/5 stars
Rolling Stone (1973)	(mixed)
Rolling Stone (2003)	4/5 stars
Alternative cover

Green Is Blues is the second studio album by American singer and songwriter Al Green. Released by Hi Records on April 15, 1969, two days after Green's 23rd birthday, critics and fans alike consider the album his breakthrough release, following the lukewarm reception of his 1967 debut, Back Up Train. Green Is Blues marks the first collaboration of Green and musician Willie Mitchell, who also served as the album's main producer; the co-founder and President of Hi Records, Joe Cuoghi, acted as the recording supervisor.

Upon the album's '40th Anniversary' re-release, as a digital deluxe package in July 2009, noted soul writer Pete Lewis of the award-winning 'Blues & Soul' stated: "Significant for matching for the first time Green's soulful refined vocal brilliance with the skilful production of co-writer/producer Willie Mitchell and the tight arrangements of Memphis' renowned Hi Rhythm Section, the album ushered in a new era for "The Memphis Sound" – effectively kick-starting a studio partnership between Green and Mitchell that would see Al go on to become the premier soul superstar of the early Seventies – and arguably the last great Southern soul singer, period."

== Track listing ==
1. "One Woman" (Charles Chalmers, Sandra Rhodes) – 3:05
2. "Talk to Me" (Joe Seneca) – 2:06
3. "My Girl" (Smokey Robinson, Ronald White) – 2:55
4. "The Letter" (Wayne Carson Thompson) – 2:28
5. "I Stand Accused" (Jerry Butler, Curtis Mayfield, Billy Butler) – 3:18
6. "Gotta Find a New World" (Carl Smith, Marion "Doc" Oliver) – 2:25
7. "What Am I Gonna Do with Myself?" (Willie Mitchell, Marshall "Rock" Jones) – 2:27
8. "Tomorrow's Dream" (Al Green, Willie Mitchell) – 2:19
9. "Get Back Baby" (Al Green) – 2:16
10. "Get Back" (John Lennon, Paul McCartney) – 2:22
11. "Summertime" (George Gershwin, Ira Gershwin, DuBose Heyward) – 3:08

=== 40th Anniversary Edition ===
The track listing for 40th anniversary edition, released 2009, includes four additional tracks:

12. "I Want to Hold Your Hand" (John Lennon, Paul McCartney) – 2:20
13. "Nothing Impossible With Love" (Jimmy Reed) – 2:37
14. "Baby, What's Wrong with You" – 3:41
15. "Memphis, Tennessee" (Chuck Berry) – 3:15

== Later samples ==
- "The Letter"
  - "L.A. L.A." by Capone-N-Noreaga from the album The War Report
  - "Long Kiss Goodnight" by the Notorious B.I.G. from the album Life After Death
  - "Creation & Destruction" by Immortal Technique from the album Revolutionary Vol. 1
  - "Somma Time Man" by Salt-N-Pepa from the album Very Necessary
- "Gotta Find a New World"
  - "Iron Maiden" by Ghostface Killah from the album Ironman
