= The Lord Will Make a Way =

Studio album by Al Green
- Released: 1980
- Studios: American Music (Memphis, Tennessee)
- Genres: Gospel, soul
- Label: Myrrh
- Producer: Al Green

Al Green chronology
Truth N' Time (1978)	The Lord Will Make a Way (1980)	Higher Plane (1981)

The Lord Will Make a Way is a studio album by American musician Al Green, released in 1980. It was his first gospel album.

The song "The Lord Will Make a Way" was written by Rev. Thomas A. Dorsey.

== Reception ==
Professional ratings
Review scores
Source	Rating
AllMusic	3/5 stars
Robert Christgau	B+

The album won a Grammy in the category of Best Soul Gospel Performance, Traditional. The title track was also Grammy nominated in the category of Best Soul Gospel Performance, Contemporary.

== Track listing ==
1. "The Lord Will Make a Way" - 3:39
2. "Pass Me Not" - 3:10
3. "Too Close" (Alex Bradford) - 3:49
4. "Highway to Heaven" - 2:56
5. "Saved" (Aaron Purdie) - 3:47
6. "None but the Righteous" - 3:24
7. "In the Holy Name of Jesus" (Aaron Purdie) - 3:24
8. "I Have a Friend Above All Others" - 3:02
9. "Highway to Heaven (Reprise)" - 1:32

== Personnel ==
- Al Green – vocals, lead guitars, arrangements (1, 2, 4, 6, 8, 9)
- Jesse Butler – acoustic piano
- Johnny Brown – organ
- Reuben Fairfax Jr. – bass
- John Toney – drums
- Andrew Love – saxophones
- Jack Hale – trombone
- Ben Cauley – trumpet
- Edgar Matthews – trumpet
- Fred Jordan – string arrangements

Production

- Al Green – producer
- Stroud – photography
- Dennis Hill – cover design
