= I'm Still in Love with You (Al Green song) =

Single by Al Green

from the album I'm Still in Love with You
- B-side: "Old Time Lovin'"
- Released: July 1972
- Genre: Soul
- Length: 3:16
- Label: Hi Records
- Songwriters: Al Green, Al Jackson, Jr, Willie Mitchell

Al Green singles chronology
"Look What You Done for Me" (1972)	"I'm Still in Love with You" (1972)	"Guilty" (1972)

"I'm Still in Love with You" is a song originally recorded by Al Green. Released from the album I'm Still in Love with You, the single spent two weeks at number 1 on the Hot Soul Singles chart in August 1972. It also peaked at number 3 on the Billboard Hot 100 singles chart that same year. It would eventually sell over one million copies and is considered one of Green's most popular songs. Billboard ranked it as the 59th best selling song of 1972.

== Charts ==
Charts (1972)	Peak position
US Billboard Hot 100	3
US Hot Soul Singles (Billboard)	1

== Cover versions ==
- Meli'sa Morgan recorded a version of this song, titled "Still in Love with You", for her 1992 album of the same title. It peaked at number 9 on the Hot Black Singles chart and number 3 on the Hot Dance Club Play chart.
