= Back Up Train =

- Original 1967 vinyl edition

Studio album by Al Greene
- Released: March 21, 1967
- Recorded: 1966
- Genre: Soul
- Length: 30:21
- Label: Hot Line Music Journal
- Producer: Curtis Rodgers, Palmer James

Al Greene chronology
Back Up Train (1967)	Green Is Blues (1969)

Professional ratings
Review scores
Source	Rating
Allmusic	3/5 stars

Back Up Train is the debut studio album by American soul singer Al Green, released by Hot Line Records, a label formed by Palmer James and Curtis Rodgers, high school friends of Al Green's. This album was released prior to signing with Hi Records and still lists his name as "Greene" (the actual correct spelling of his name). The title track was originally released in January 1967 as a single under the band name "Al Greene and The Soul Mates".

The album has been reissued, first in 1972 on Bell Records 6076 as Al Green (and a release of "Guilty" as a single, which became a Top 30 R&B hit), then in 1999 on Arista 7822-19097-2 as Al Green Master Hits. In 2005, with Sony's acquisition of the BMG/Arista catalog, it was issued again on Legacy 82876-69548-2 as Back Up Train with the original artwork from 1967.

== Track listing ==
1. "Back Up Train" (Curtis Rodgers, Palmer James) - 2:19
2. "Hot Wire" (Palmer James) - 2:55
3. "Stop and Check Myself" (Al Green) - 1:41
4. "Let Me Help You" (Palmer James) - 1:47
5. "I’m Reachin’ Out" (Tip Watkins) - 2:43
6. "Don’t Hurt Me No More" (Curtis Rodgers, Palmer James) - 2:16
7. "Don’t Leave Me" (Palmer James) - 2:17
8. "I’ll Be Good to You" (Tip Watkins) - 2:13
9. "Guilty" (Robert Earl Williams) - 2:56
10. "That’s All It Takes (Lady)" (Curtis Rodgers) - 2:19
11. "Get Yourself Together" (Tip Watkins, Palmer James) - 2:25
12. "What’s It All About" (Tip Watkins, Palmer James) - 1:54
13. "A Lover's Hideaway" (Tip Watkins, Palmer James) - 2:36
