= Driving Wheel =

Blues song first recorded by Roosevelt Sykes in 1936

"Driving Wheel Blues"

Single by the Honey Dripper a.k.a. Roosevelt Sykes
- B-side: "Barrel House Man"
- Released: 1936
- Recorded: February 18, 1936
- Genre: Blues
- Length: 3:06
- Label: Decca
- Songwriter: Roosevelt Sykes

"Driving Wheel", also called "Drivin' Wheel" or "Driving Wheel Blues", is a blues song first recorded by Roosevelt Sykes (listed as "The Honey Dripper") in 1936. It was an influential early blues composition and has been recorded by numerous artists, including Junior Parker and Al Green, whose renditions were hits on the record charts.

== Original song ==
Roosevelt Sykes' "Driving Wheel Blues" is a solo twelve-bar blues, with Sykes providing piano accompaniment to his vocal. The song is performed at a medium tempo with the opening lyrics:

People, I don't have to work and I ain't gonna rob and steal (2×)
My baby gives me everything I need, she is my driving wheel

Sykes' recorded the song on February 18, 1936, for Decca Records. "Driving Wheel" has been identified as an influential early blues composition.

Sykes later recorded additional studio and live versions of the song. A version from the late 1940s includes the opening verse with the genders reversed:

My baby don't have to work, she don't have to rob and steal (2×)
I give her everything she needs, I am her driving wheel

== Renditions ==
Junior Parker, as "Little Junior Parker", recorded "Driving Wheel" for Duke Records in 1960 or 1961. Although Parker's vocal line and lyrics follow Sykes' late 1940s version, the song uses a group arrangement with a horn section and adds a break in the middle of the song. Musician and music writer Billy Vera notes: "Fronting a horn section was really how Junior heard himself. He was a singer, not a shouter. His voice was sweet, his vibrato throbbing ... [his songs] were all more melodic than the average blues."

Most subsequent versions of "Driving Wheel" show Parker's influence, including the distinctive bass line. When the song was released in 1961, it spent eleven weeks on the US Billboard R&B chart, where it reached number five; it also reached number 85 in the pop chart.

In 1971, soul/gospel singer Al Green recorded the song in Memphis for Hi Records. His song peaked at number 46 on the R&B chart and reached number 115 on the Bubbling Under Hot 100 Singles pop chart. The song is included on the 1971 Al Green Gets Next to You album as well as various compilation albums. Green's version uses a different arrangement, in keeping with his soul music approach.
