= He Is the Light =

Studio album by Al Green
- Released: 1985
- Studio: Royal (Memphis, TN)
- Genre: Soul, gospel
- Label: A&M
- Producer: Willie Mitchell

Al Green chronology
Trust in God (1984)	He Is the Light (1985)	Soul Survivor (1987)

He Is the Light is an album by Al Green, released in 1985. It was Green's first album for A&M Records.

The album peaked at No. 11 on the Billboard Top Gospel Albums chart.

== Production ==
The album marked the return of producer Willie Mitchell, who had last worked on 1976's Have a Good Time. It was recorded at Royal Studios, with many of the same musicians Green employed in the 1970s.

== Critical reception ==
Professional ratings
Review scores
Source	Rating
AllMusic	3/5 stars
Robert Christgau	B+
The Encyclopedia of Popular Music	3/5 stars
The Philadelphia Inquirer	4/4 stars
The Rolling Stone Album Guide	3.5/5 stars

Robert Christgau wrote that "Leroy Hodges's famous bottom keeps the record flowing like none of Green's other Jesus LPs, but it's still songs that make or break--and in this case do neither." Rolling Stone declared that "the only great new Al Green song here is 'Power', which builds on 'Jesus Is Waiting' and 'Have You Been Making Out O.K.' but claims its own space in the pantheon." The Globe and Mail called He Is the Light "a gorgeous record: spare, crisp production, and tunes that haunt you."

== Track listing ==
1. "Going Away" (Al Green) – 3:38
2. "True Love" (Green, Willie Mitchell) – 4:31
3. "He Is the Light" (Mitchell, Julius Bradley) – 3:24
4. "I Feel Like Going On" (Green) – 3:13
5. "Be with Me Jesus" (Sam Cooke) – 2:54
6. "You Brought the Sunshine" (Elbernita Clark) – 5:10
7. "Power" (Green, Mitchell) – 5:21
8. "Building Up" (Green) – 3:10
9. "Nearer My God to Thee" – 3:46

== Personnel ==
- Al Green – lead and backing vocals, guitars, arrangements (9)
- Perry Michael Allen – keyboards, synthesizer, percussion, string arrangements, synthesizer arrangements
- Andrew Jackson – keyboards
- David Cousar – guitars
- Angelo Earl – guitars
- Teenie Hodges – guitars
- Perry Michael Allen – keyboards, synthesizers, percussion, string arrangements, synthesizer arrangements
- Steve Cobb – bass
- Leroy Hodges – bass
- Jimmy Kinnard – bass
- Steve Potts – drums
- Gary Topper – baritone saxophone
- Andrew Love – tenor saxophone
- Jack Hale – trombone
- Ben Cauley – trumpet
- Willie Mitchell – horn and string arrangements
- The Memphis Strings – strings
- Kelli Bruce – backing vocals
- Debbie Jamison – backing vocals
- Michelle Omata – backing vocals

Production

- Producer and engineer – Willie Mitchell
- Remix – Perry Michael Allen and Willie Mitchell
- Mastered by Larry Nix at Ardent Studios (Memphis, TN)
- Art direction – Chuck Beeson and Jeff Gold
- Design – Melanie Nissen
- Photography – Mark Hanauer
