= White Christmas (Al Green album) =

Studio album by Al Green
- Released: 1983
- Studio: American Music Studio (Memphis, Tennessee)
- Genre: Christmas, Soul, Gospel
- Label: Myrrh
- Producer: Moses Dillard

Al Green chronology
I'll Rise Again (1983)	White Christmas (1983)	Trust in God (1984)

Professional ratings
Review scores
Source	Rating
Allmusic	3/5 stars

White Christmas is a Christmas album by Al Green, first released in 1983. It is his 18th studio album. The album has been reissued under different titles, and sometimes with different sequencing.

== Track listing ==
1. "White Christmas" - 2:33
2. "The Christmas Song" - 3:27
3. "Winter Wonderland" - 2:05
4. "I'll Be Home for Christmas" - 3:13
5. "Jingle Bells" (P.D.) - 1:58
6. "What Christmas Means to Me" (Mosea Dillard, Claude Hill, Sharon Michalsky, Chiquita Mullins) - 3:45
7. "Oh Holy Night" (P.D.) - 3:41
8. "Silent Night" (Morton Gould) - 3:18
9. "It Feels Like Christmas" (Al Green) - 3:20

== Personnel ==
Musicians

- Al Green – lead vocals
- Jesse Butler – keyboards
- Carl Marsh – synthesizers
- Thomas Bingham – guitars
- Moses Dillard – guitars
- Ray Griffin – bass
- Steve Potts – drums
- Archie Jordan – strings
- Debra Carter – backing vocals
- Harvey Jones – backing vocals
- Linda Jones – backing vocals

Arrangements

- Al Green – string arrangements (1, 2, 3, 7, 9), BGV arrangements
- Moses Dillard – rhythm arrangements, string arrangements (1, 2, 3, 7, 9)
- Lloyd Barry – synthesizer arrangements, string arrangements (1, 4, 5, 6, 8)
- Chris McDonald – music copyist

== Production ==
- Moses Dillard – producer
- Al Green – executive producer
- Paul Zaleski – engineer, remixing
- Rob Dickinson – assistant engineer
- Hank Williams – mastering at MasterMix (Nashville, Tennessee)
- McConnell Graphics – art direction
- Mark Tucker – photography
