= Soul Survivor (Al Green album) =

Studio album by Al Green
- Released: 1987
- Genres: Soul, gospel
- Label: A&M
- Producers: Eban Kelly, Jimi Randolph, Deborah McDuffie, Errol Thomas, Paul Zaleski

Al Green chronology
| He Is the Light (1985) | Soul Survivor (1987) | I Get Joy (1989) |

Soul Survivor is a studio album by the American musician Al Green, released in 1987. The album peaked at No. 131 on the Billboard 200.

== Production ==
The cover of "You've Got a Friend" is a duet with Billy Preston. Green also covered the Hollies' "He Ain't Heavy, He's My Brother". A gospel choir backed Green on "The 23rd Psalm" and "Yield Not to Temptation".

== Critical reception ==
Professional ratings
Review scores
| Source | Rating |
|---|---|
| AllMusic | 3/5 stars |
| Robert Christgau | A− |
| The Gazette | 7.5/10 |

The Chicago Tribune deemed Soul Survivor "an album of richly moving and vibrant singing." The Gazette wrote that "it's nice to feel the power of [Green's] healing voice in real material again." The Globe and Mail called the album "a quixotic mixture [that] in every way reflects the rather schizophrenic nature of Green himself." The Dallas Morning News praised the "secular/funk texture" of the title track.

== Track listing ==
1. "Everything's Gonna Be Alright" (Eban Kelly, Jimi Randolph) - 4:21
2. "Jesus Will Fix It" (Al Green) - 3:24
3. "You Know and I Know" (Green, Paul Zaleski) - 4:01
4. "Yield Not to Temptation" (Traditional) - 3:35
5. "So Real to Me" (Green) - 0:54
6. "Soul Survivor" (Kelly, Randolph) - 4:43
7. "You've Got a Friend" (Carole King) - 5:37 (duet with Billy Preston)
8. "He Ain't Heavy" (Sidney Russell, Bobby Scott) - 4:03
9. "23rd Psalm" (Green) - 3:46

== Personnel ==
- Al Green – lead vocals, backing vocals (2, 3, 6), acoustic guitar (2, 4, 5, 9), arrangements (2–5, 8, 9)
- Jimi Randolph – all other instruments (1), arrangements (1, 6), all instruments (6)
- P. Leon Thomas – keyboards (1)
- Debra Carter – organ (4, 9)
- Louis Paul – synthesizers (5)
- Jonathan Cobert – synthesizers (7)
- Billy Preston – Hammond B3 organ (7), lead vocals (7)
- Jerry Peters – keyboards (8)
- Michael Toles – electric guitar (2, 5), organ (5)
- Bobby Manuel – guitars (8)
- Paul Zaleski – bass guitar (2), percussion (2, 3), keyboards (3)
- Francisco Centeno – bass guitar (7)
- Willie Hall – drums (2–5, 9), percussion (5)
- Jeff Vilinsky – drums (7), arrangements (7)
- Steve Mergen – drums (8)
- Errol Thomas – arrangements (3, 8), bass guitar (4, 8, 9)
- Deborah McDuffie – arrangements (7)
- Andrew Love – saxophone (8)
- Berkley Buckles – backing vocals (1)
- Eban Kelly – backing vocals (1, 6), arrangements (1, 6)
- Full Gospel Tabernacle Choir – backing vocals (4, 9)
- Andrea Blackwood – backing vocals (5)
- Donna Blackwood – backing vocals (5)
- Jeanie Hamilton – backing vocals (5)
- Michael Brown – backing vocals (7)
- Dennis Collins – backing vocals (7)
- Curtis King – backing vocals (7)
- Patrice Taylor – backing vocals (8)

Production

- Producers – Eban Kelly and Jimi Randolph (Tracks 1 & 6); Errol Thomas and Paul Zaleski (Tracks 2–5, 8 & 9); Deborah McDuffie (Track 7).
- Executive producer – Al Green
- Engineers – Jimi Randolph (Tracks 1 & 6); Al Green, Errol Thomas and Paul Zaleski (Tracks 2–5, 7, 8 & 9).
- Assistant engineers – Eban Kelly (Tracks 1 & 6); Ron Dickerson, Tom Luani and Pat Taylor (Tracks 2–5, 7, 8 & 9).
- Recorded at Al Green Music Recording Studio and Ardent Studios (Memphis, TN); Startec (Washington D.C.); Mayfair Recording Studios (New York, NY).
- Mixed at Al Green Music Recording Studio; Ardent Studios; Mayfair Recording Studios; Mission Control Studios (Boston, MA).
- Mastered by Brian Gardner at Bernie Grundman Mastering (Hollywood, CA).
- Art direction – Chuck Beeson
- Design – Donald Krieger
- Photography – Peter Nash
