= Let's Stay Together (Al Green song) =

1971 single by Al Green

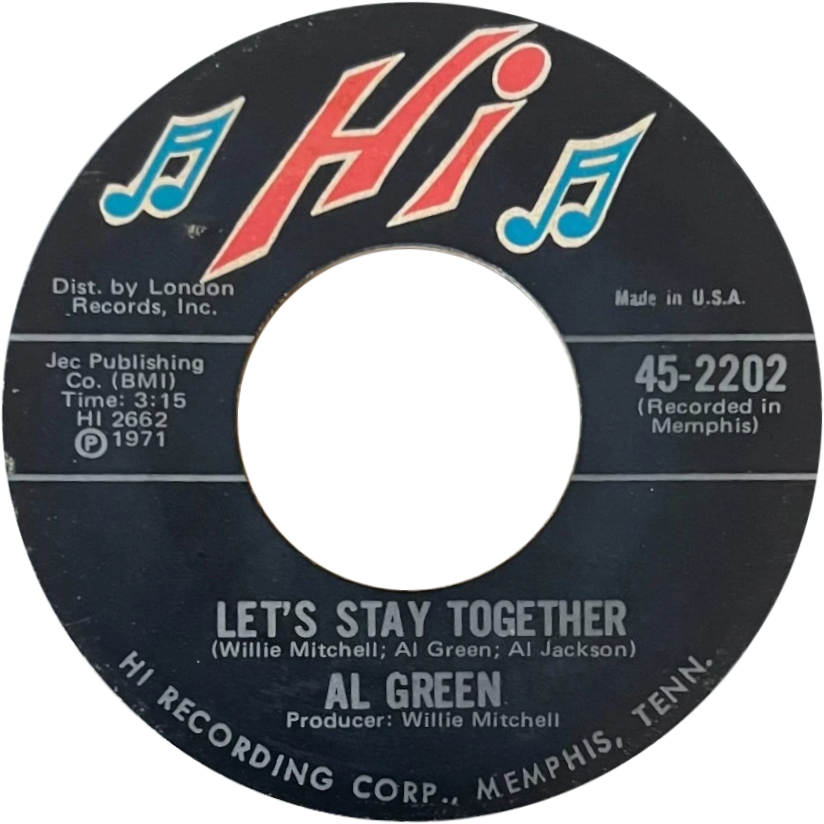
- US single of the Al Green recording

Single by Al Green

from the album Let's Stay Together
- B-side: "Tomorrow's Dream"
- Released: November 1971
- Recorded: 1971
- Genre: Soul
- Length: 3:18
- Label: Hi 2202
- Songwriters: Al Green; Willie Mitchell; Al Jackson Jr.
- Producer: Willie Mitchell

Al Green singles chronology
| "Tired of Being Alone" (1971) | "Let's Stay Together" (1971) | "Look What You Done for Me" (1972) |

Performance video
- "Let's Stay Together" by Al Green on YouTube

Audio
- "Let's Stay Together" by Al Green on YouTube

"Let's Stay Together" is a song by American singer Al Green from his 1972 album of the same name. It was produced and recorded by Willie Mitchell, and mixed by Mitchell and Terry Manning. Released as a single in 1971, "Let's Stay Together" reached number 1 on the US Billboard Hot 100, and remained on the chart for 16 weeks and also topped Billboard's R&B chart for nine weeks. Billboard ranked it as eleventh-highest selling song of 1972.

It was ranked the 60th greatest song of all time by Rolling Stone magazine on their 2004 list of the 500 Greatest Songs of All Time, and has been covered by numerous other performers, most notably Tina Turner.

It was selected by the Library of Congress as a 2010 addition to the National Recording Registry, which selects recordings annually that are "culturally, historically, or aesthetically significant". The song went on to claim the number 1 position on the Billboard Year-End chart as an R&B song for 1972.

In 1999, the 1971 recording on Hi Records by Al Green was inducted into the Grammy Hall of Fame. In June 2026, CBS News included the song in its list of the 250 essential American songs of the past 250 years.

== Charts ==
=== Weekly charts ===
| Chart (1971–1972) | Peak position |
|---|---|
| Canada Top Singles (RPM) | 14 |
| UK Singles (Official Charts) | 7 |
| US Billboard Hot 100 | 1 |
| US Best-Selling Soul Singles (Billboard) | 1 |
| US Adult Contemporary | 36 |
| US Cash Box Top 100 | 1 |

=== Year-end charts ===
| Chart (1972) | Position |
|---|---|
| US Billboard | 11 |
| US Cash Box Top 100 | 7 |

== Certifications ==
| Region | Certification | Certified units/sales |
|---|---|---|
| Denmark (IFPI Danmark) | Gold | 45,000^{‡} |
| Italy (FIMI) | Gold | 25,000^{‡} |
| New Zealand (RMNZ) | 4× Platinum | 120,000^{‡} |
| Spain (Promusicae) | Platinum | 60,000^{‡} |
| United Kingdom (BPI) | Platinum | 600,000^{‡} |
| United States (RIAA) | Platinum | 1,000,000^{‡} |
^{‡} Sales+streaming figures based on certification alone.

== Tina Turner version ==
"Let's Stay Together"
- White-font variant of standard artwork

Single by Tina Turner

from the album Private Dancer
- B-side: "I Wrote a Letter"
- Released: November 7, 1983 (UK); January 1984 (US)
- Recorded: 1983
- Genre: New wave; dance-pop
- Length: 3:36 (single version); 5:14 (album version)
- Label: Capitol
- Songwriters: Al Green; Willie Mitchell; Al Jackson, Jr.
- Producers: Martyn Ware; Greg Walsh

Tina Turner singles chronology
| "Ball of Confusion" (1982) | "Let's Stay Together" (1983) | "Help!" (1984) |

Music video
- "Let's Stay Together" by Tina Turner on YouTube

Audio
- "Let's Stay Together" (album version) by Tina Turner on YouTube

"Let's Stay Together" was later covered by American singer and actress Tina Turner, her second collaboration with the British Heaven 17 and British Electric Foundation production team after "Ball of Confusion" in 1982, and served as her comeback single in late 1983. Unlike Al Green's version, Turner sings verse 2 first, then verse 1 when the band starts playing.

Released by Capitol Records in November 1983, the single charted at number 6 in the UK (one place higher than Al Green's original) and became the third time she reached the UK top ten, the first two being with former husband Ike Turner on "River Deep, Mountain High" and "Nutbush City Limits". Following the US release in January 1984, the single reached #24 in Cash Box, #26 on the Billboard Hot 100, #3 on the Billboard R&B Chart, and number 1 on the Billboard Dance Chart.

At the time, the song was the most successful solo single Turner had released. It was included on her multi-platinum selling album Private Dancer, released a few months later in the spring of 1984. The music video was directed by David Mallet. The cover photography was by Norman Seeff.

=== Personnel ===
- Tina Turner – lead vocals
- Gary Barnacle – saxophone
- Glenn Gregory – background vocals
- Rupert Hine – percussion
- Frank Ricotti – percussion
- Ray Russell – guitar
- Martyn Ware – programming, electronic drums, arrangements, background vocals
- Greg Walsh – programming, arrangements
- Nick Plytas – piano, synthesizer

Production

- Greg Walsh – producer & engineer
- Martyn Ware – producer
- Walter Samuel – engineer
- Alan Yoshida – mastering
- Akira Taguchi – compilation producer
- Sam Gay – creative director
- Roy Kohara – art direction
- John O'Brien – design
- Peter Ashworth – photography
- Roger Davies – management
- Chip Lightman – management

=== Track listing and formats ===
- 7-inch single
1. "Let's Stay Together" – 3:36
2. "I Wrote a Letter" – 3:24
- 12-inch single
1. "Let's Stay Together" (Extended Version) – 5:14
2. "I Wrote a Letter" – 3:24

=== Charts and certifications ===
==== Weekly charts ====
| Chart (1983–1984) | Peak position |
|---|---|
| Australia (Kent Music Report) | 19 |
| Belgium (Ultratop 50 Flanders) | 7 |
| Canada Top Singles (RPM) | 43 |
| Finland (Suomen virallinen lista) | 20 |
| Germany (Official German Charts) | 18 |
| Ireland (IRMA) | 15 |
| Netherlands (Dutch Top 40) | 4 |
| Netherlands (Single Top 100) | 5 |
| New Zealand (Recorded Music NZ) | 4 |
| Switzerland (Schweizer Hitparade) | 28 |
| UK Singles (Official Charts) | 6 |
| US Billboard Hot 100 | 26 |
| US Hot Dance Club Songs (Billboard) | 1 |
| US Hot R&B/Hip-Hop Songs (Billboard) | 3 |
| US Cash Box Top 100 | 24 |

==== Year-end charts ====
| Chart (1983) | Rank |
|---|---|
| UK Singles (OCC) | 46 |
| Chart (1984) | Rank |
| Belgium (Ultratop 50 Flanders) | 83 |
| New Zealand (Recorded Music NZ) | 30 |
| US Hot Dance Club Songs (Billboard) | 30 |
| US Hot R&B/Hip-Hop Songs (Billboard) | 36 |

==== Certifications and sales ====
| Region | Certification | Certified units/sales |
|---|---|---|
| United Kingdom (BPI) | Silver | 250,000^{^} |
^{^} Shipments figures based on certification alone.

== Other notable cover versions ==
"Let's Stay Together" has been covered by many artists. The most widely heard versions include:

- A version by Margie Joseph was recorded for her 1973 album Margie Joseph. She had also recorded in Memphis contemporaneous to Green, but offered a Philly-inspired version produced by Arif Mardin.
- A version by Bobby Militello with Jean Carn on his 1982 album Blow reached number 74 on the U.S. R&B chart.
- An instrumental version with Andrew Love covering the melody on saxophone was recorded by the Memphis Horns on their 1992 album Flame Out.
- British R&B group the Pasadenas released their version in 1992 which reached No. 22 on the UK Singles Chart and No. 43 on the UK Airplay Chart.
- A version by Michelle Williams, produced by Jazze Pha appears on the Roll Bounce (2005) soundtrack. In a 2006 interview, Williams stated that the track was originally recorded for a campaign with GAP. A demo video, believed to be linked to the campaign was shared online.

== Other appearances ==
The song has been used in the films, including:

- Quentin Tarantino film Pulp Fiction (1994).
- Guillermo del Toro film Hellboy (2004).
- US President Barack Obama sang a brief phrase of the song during an appearance at the Apollo Theater in New York City on January 19, 2012, for a campaign fundraiser that included Al Green as an opening act.

== See also ==
- Hot 100 number-one hits of 1972 (United States)
- Number-one dance hits of 1984 (USA)
- R&B number-one hits of 1972 (USA)
