= Trust in God =

Studio album by Al Green
- Released: 1984
- Studios: Al Green Music (Memphis, TN)
- Genres: Soul, gospel
- Label: Myrrh
- Producer: Paul Zaleski

Al Green chronology
White Christmas (1983)	Trust in God (1984)	He Is the Light (1985)

Professional ratings
Review scores
Source	Rating
AllMusic	2/5 stars
Robert Christgau	B
The Encyclopedia of Popular Music	3/5 stars
The Rolling Stone Album Guide	3/5 stars

Trust in God is a studio album by soul singer Al Green, released in 1984. It is a collection of cover songs, performed in the style of gospel music.

== Track listing ==
1. "Don't It Make You Wanna Go Home" (Joe South) - 3:07
2. "Up the Ladder to the Roof" (Vincent DiMirco) - 3:33
3. "Ain't No Mountain High Enough" (Nickolas Ashford, Valerie Simpson) - 2:23
4. "Trust in God" (Al Green, Johnny Brown) - 4:11
5. "No Not One" (Green) - 4:09
6. "Lean on Me" (Bill Withers) - 2:09
7. "Never Met Anybody Like You" (Green) - 2:52
8. "Holy Spirit" (Lindy Hearne) - 3:07
9. "Trust in God (Reprise)" (Green, Brown) - 1:33
10. "All We Need Is a Little More Love" (Green) - 3:32

== Personnel ==
- Al Green – lead and backing vocals, acoustic guitar, electric guitar, percussion, string arrangements
- Johnny Brown – Rhodes, organ
- Jesse Butler – Rhodes, acoustic piano, organ, synthesizers
- Jerry Peters – synthesizers
- Paul Zaleski – synthesizers
- Moses Dillard – electric guitar
- Mabon Hodges – electric guitar
- Gerard Minnies – electric guitar
- Reuben Fairfax, Jr. – bass
- Ray Griffin – bass
- Tim Dancy – drums, percussion
- Steve Potts – drums
- Paul Jordan – string arrangements
- Andrea Blackwood – backing vocals
- Candi Grant – backing vocals
- Jeanne Grant – backing vocals
- Bountiful Blessings Choir – backing vocals

Production

- Producer – Paul Zaleski
- Executive producer – Al Green
- Engineers – Ron Dickerson, Al Green and Paul Zaleski.
- Mastered by Hank Williams at MasterMix (Nashville, TN).
- Art direction – McConnell Graphics
- Photography – Mark Tucker
