= Angelo Earl =

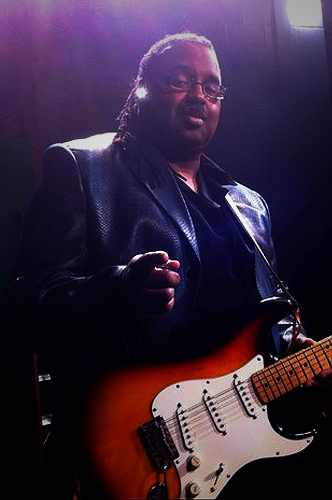

Background information
- Genres: R&B, soul, funk, blues-rock, blues, hip hop
- Occupation(s): Musician, record producer, audio engineer
- Instrument(s): Electric guitar, electric bass
- Years active: 1975–present
- Labels: Soul Street Records

Angelo Earl is an American guitarist, record producer, songwriter and owner of Soul Street Records. Earl is most widely known for playing electric guitar on Al Green's "He Is The Light", Bobby Rush's "Southern Soul", the Bar-kays' "The Real Thing", contributing vocal work to Isaac Hayes' "Branded", touring with the Jackson family tand ouring with the Funk Brothers. Recently, Earl appeared on episodes of The Jacksons: A Family Dynasty on A&E. Earl's musical career has spanned over 20 years.

== Early years ==
Angelo Earl began his professional career in 1975 with guitar tracks recorded on Yanique's album Lovin' You.

== Engineering, production and writing ==
Earl performed engineering on Jody Watley's album Affection alongside musical great Booker T. Jones. Angelo Earl also produced RCA recording artist Cherokee's critically acclaimed debut album in 1997, I Love You.. Me. Earl has served as a staff engineer for both Ardent and Cotton Row studios.

In 1990, he played on Cybil Sheppard's solo jazz album, Somewhere Down The Road produced by Sid Selvidge.

In 1993, Earl engineered and produced music for the Motown documentary film, Only The Strong Survive and in 1994, Earl produced music for the film, Little Giants in both production and recording capacities. Earl also played the part of a prisoner in the 1984 CBS Television show, The Mississippi.

In 2005, Earl produced The Tim Terry Experience album The Tim Terry Experience and released it on his record label, Soulstreet Records. Angelo Earl tracked the album at Ardent Studios in Memphis, TN and mixed it at Prince's studio, Paisley Park. At its height, The Tim Terry Experience album reached the #3 position for soul music on the United Kingdom Soul charts in 2005. It also received 4 1/2 stars in Blues and Soul Magazine Review in the UK.

Angelo Earl continues to operate Soulstreet Records and tours with various acts.

== Electric guitar ==
Earl's electric guitar work includes:

- Al Green – He Is The Light (Album)
- Al Green – I Get Joy (Album)
- Archie Love – Love Chronicles (Album)
- Archie Love – Exposed (Album)
- Bobby Rush – Southern Soul (Album)
- Bar-kays – Real Thing (Album)
- Bar-kays – House Party (Album)
- Bar-kays – Animal (Album)
- Bobby Blue Bland – (Live Tour)
- Black Oak Arkansas – (Live Tour)
- Cree Summers – (Live Tour)
- Dr. Dre – Dr. Dre Presents The Aftermath (Album)
- George Clinton – (Live Tour)
- Lynn White – Sorry
- Cybil Sheppard – Somewhere Down The Road
- Latimore – (Live Tour)
- Lisa Santiago – Feels So Good (Show Me Your Love) (Album)
- Billy Always – Let's Get Personal
- Jody Watley – Affection (Album)
- Domino – Physical Funk (Album)
- Cherokee – I Love You...Me (Album)
- Kevin Page – (Live Tour)
- Stacey Merino – Stacey Merino (Album)
- Mable John – (Live Tour)
- Jack Ashford – (Live Tour)
- Thelma Houston – (Live Tour)
- Brenda Holloway – (Live Tour)
- Chris Clark – (Live Tour)
- Shirley Brown – Holding My Own (Album)
- SSP – Country & Hardheaded
- Tito Jackson – (Live Tour)
- The Soul Children – Still Standing (Album)
- Tydyl Wave – Break Down the Walls (Album)
- Larry Springfield – "I'm Just a Man”
- J Blackfoot – "Woof Woof Meow"
- Cherokee – "I Love You...Me"
- Wet, Wet, Wet – Memphis Sessions
- Kevin Rowland – The Wanderer (Album)
