= Lay It Down (Al Green album) =

Studio album by Al Green
- Released: May 27, 2008
- Genre: Soul
- Length: 44:31
- Label: Blue Note^{B2-48449}
- Producer: Ahmir "Questlove" Thompson, James Poyser

Al Green chronology
Everything's OK (2005)	Lay It Down (2008)

Professional ratings
Aggregate scores
Source	Rating
Metacritic	81/100
Review scores
Source	Rating
AllMusic	4/5 stars
Entertainment Weekly	A−
Los Angeles Times	3.5/4 stars
Mojo	4/5 stars
MSN Music (Consumer Guide)	A−
Pitchfork	6.8/10
PopMatters	9/10
Rolling Stone	3.5/5 stars
Spin	8/10
The Times	4/5 stars

Lay It Down is the 29th studio album by American singer Al Green, released May 27, 2008, on Blue Note Records. The album was produced by Ahmir "Questlove" Thompson and James Poyser. The album features guest vocals from Anthony Hamilton, John Legend, and Corinne Bailey Rae.

Lay It Down peaked at number 9 on Billboard's Top Album charts, and has received widespread acclaim from critics. At the 51st Annual Grammy Awards, the album was nominated for Best R&B Album but lost to Jennifer Hudson's self-titled album. "Stay With Me (By the Sea)" won Al Green and John Legend the Best R&B Performance by a Duo or Group with Vocal award, and "You've Got the Love I Need" won Green and Anthony Hamilton the award for Best Traditional R&B Vocal Performance.

== Critical reception ==
Lay It Down has received much critical acclaim. It currently holds a rating of 81/100 on review aggregator website Metacritic, based on 22 critical reviews, indicating "universal acclaim".

The album was applauded for bringing in younger producers which critics claimed gave the album a more youthful sound. Thom Jurek for AllMusic commented: "What happens when you put that amazing soul-drenched voice in the hands of hip-hop producers Questlove and James Poyser, and add a slew of superstar guests? Answer: a killer Al Green soul album". In a review for Blender, Ben Ratliff remarked that Green had "created a natural-sounding album with occasional horns and strings, taking cues directly from [his] best old records". "Lay It Down" was number 15 on Rolling Stone's list of the 100 Best Songs of 2008.

== Track listing ==
All tracks are written by Al Green.

No.	Title	Featured vocalist	Length
1.	"Lay It Down"	Anthony Hamilton	4:30
2.	"Just for Me"		3:58
3.	"You've Got the Love I Need"	Anthony Hamilton	4:14
4.	"No One Like You"		4:31
5.	"What More Do You Want from Me"		4:13
6.	"Take Your Time"	Corinne Bailey Rae	4:37
7.	"Too Much"		3:30
8.	"Stay with Me (By the Sea)"	John Legend	3:23
9.	"All I Need"		3:41
10.	"I'm Wild About You"		4:51
11.	"Standing in the Rain"		3:03
Total length:			44:31

== Personnel ==
Adapted from CD liner notes.

- Al Green – vocals
- Anthony Hamilton – vocals (3), background vocals (1, 3)
- Corinne Bailey Rae – vocals (6), background vocals (6, 8)
- John Legend – vocals (8), background vocals (8)
- Chalmers "Spanky" Alford – guitar
- Randy Bowland – additional guitar (2, 3, 8, 11)
- James Poyser – piano, organ
- Adam Blackstone – bass (1–5, 7–11)
- Owen Biddle – bass (6)
- Ahmir "?uestlove" Thompson – drums (1–10)
- Homer Steinweiss – drums (11)
- Danny Sadownick – percussion (2, 5, 11)
- The Dap-Kings Horns – horns
- Neal Sugarman – tenor saxophone
- Ian Hendrickson Smith – baritone
- Jaguar Wright, Mercedes Martinez – background vocals

Additional personnel

- Larry Gold – string orchestrator and conductor (1, 3, 6, 7, 9)
- Al Green, James Poyser, Ahmir "?uestlove" Thompson – producer
- Richard Nichols, Eli Wolf – executive producer

== Charts ==
=== Weekly charts ===
Chart (2008)	Peak position
Austrian Albums (Ö3 Austria)	54
Belgian Albums (Ultratop Flanders)	87
Dutch Albums (Album Top 100)	66
French Albums (SNEP)	55
Swedish Albums (Sverigetopplistan)	44
Swiss Albums (Schweizer Hitparade)	99
UK Albums (OCC)	88
US Billboard 200	9
US Top R&B/Hip-Hop Albums (Billboard)	3

=== Year-end charts ===
Chart (2008)	Position
US Top R&B/Hip-Hop Albums (Billboard)	72
