= I'll Rise Again =

Studio album by Al Green
- Released: 1983
- Studios: American Music (Memphis, TN)
- Genres: Soul, gospel
- Length: 37:02
- Label: Myrrh
- Producer: Al Green

Al Green chronology
Precious Lord (1982)	I'll Rise Again (1983)	White Christmas (1983)

I'll Rise Again is a gospel album by Al Green, released in 1983.

The album peaked at No. 4 on the Billboard Top Gospel Albums chart. During the 26th Annual Grammy Awards in 1984, Green won the Grammy Award for Best Soul Gospel Performance, Male, being the first recipient of the category.

== Critical reception ==
Professional ratings
Review scores
Source	Rating
AllMusic	4/5 stars
Robert Christgau	A−
The Encyclopedia of Popular Music	3/5 stars
The Rolling Stone Album Guide	4/5 stars

The New York Times listed I'll Rise Again among the ten best albums of 1983.

== Track listing ==
1. "It Don't Take Much" (Emmett Wilson, Hodges Wilson) - 3:23
2. "Jesus Is Coming (Back Again)" (Arthur Baker) - 4:59
3. "Leaning on the Everlasting Arms" - 2:38
4. "I Close My Eyes and Smile" (Johnny Brown, Emmett Wilson) - 3:23
5. "Ocean Blue (I'll Rise Again)" (Teenie Hodges, Emmett Wilson) - 4:13
6. "Look at the Things That God Made" (Arthur Baker) - 3:50
7. "I Just Can't Make It By Myself" (Clara Ward) - 4:25
8. "I Know It Was the Blood" (Michael Baker) - 5:15
9. "Straighten Out Your Life" (Jr. Lee) - 5:00

== Personnel ==
- Al Green – lead vocals, backing vocals, string arrangements
- Jesse Butler – keyboards
- Jerry Peters – keyboards, synthesizers, string arrangements
- Michael Baker – guitars, backing vocals
- Mabon Hodges – guitars
- Larry Lee – guitars
- Steve Cobb – bass
- Ray Griffin – bass
- Steve Potts – drums
- Memphis Symphony Orchestra – strings
- William C. Brown III – backing vocals
- Debra Carter – backing vocals
- Linda Jones – backing vocals

Production

- Producer – Al Green
- Engineer and Remix – William C. Brown III
- Mastered by Larry Nix at Ardent Mastering Lab 1 (Memphis, TN).
- Art Direction – Dennis Hill
- Photography – Alan Messer
