= Love Is Reality =

Studio album by Al Green
- Released: 1992
- Genres: Soul, gospel, R&B
- Label: World/Epic
- Producer: Tim Miner

Al Green chronology
From My Soul (1990)	Love Is Reality (1992)	Don't Look Back (1993)

Love Is Reality is an album by the American musician Al Green, released in 1992.

The album was nominated for a Grammy Award for "Best Contemporary Soul Gospel Album". It peaked at No. 29 on Billboard's Top Gospel Albums chart.

== Production ==
Recorded in Dallas, Love Is Reality was produced by Tim Miner. It was an attempt to marry Green's traditional gospel and soul sounds to new jack swing. Kirk Whalum played saxophone on the album; El DeBarge contributed backing vocals.

Green cowrote all of the album's songs. He raps on "You Don't Know Me".

== Critical reception ==
Professional ratings
Review scores
Source	Rating
AllMusic	3/5 stars
Boston Herald	C+
Calgary Herald	B+
Chicago Tribune	4/4 stars
The Encyclopedia of Popular Music	2/5 stars

Stereo Review wrote that Love Is Reality "would have been a better album if the gospel flavor were stronger, but Green pulls it all off with his customary aplomb." The Chicago Tribune thought that some songs "are nearly indistinguishable from standard urban contemporary fare, with slick arrangements and occasionally ambiguous lyrics that are a far cry from standard hymns."

The Calgary Herald determined that "the compositions here aren't bad, but it's Green's fluidly fervent, honey-toned voice which sets this disc apart." USA Today called the album "a disappointment," and listed it as the third worst R&B album of 1992. The Richmond Times-Dispatch deemed it a "high-tech, contemporary R&B gospel album." The Boston Herald considered it to be "the weakest album of Green's career."

AllMusic wrote that "Christian dance-pop producer Tim Miner works from formulas, while Green runs on inspiration."

== Track listing ==
No.	Title	Writer(s)	Length
1.	"I Can Feel It"	Al Green, Tim Miner, Mark Stitts, Mike Stitts	4:59
2.	"Love Is Reality"	Green, Mark Stitts, Mike Stitts	4:34
3.	"Just Can't Let You Go"	Green, Miner	4:08
4.	"You Don't Know Me"	Cindy Cruse, Green, Miner	4:07
5.	"Again"	Angie Alan Ebensberger, David Ebensberger, Green	4:52
6.	"Positive Attitude"	Angie Alan Ebensberger, David Ebensberger, Green	4:30
7.	"Sure Feel Good"	Angie Alan Ebensberger, David Ebensberger, Green	4:29
8.	"Long Time"	Green, Miner	4:02
9.	"Why"	Green, Miner, John Wirtz, Robert Wirtz	4:13
10.	"I Like It"	Angie Alan Ebensberger, David Ebensberger, Green	4:02

== Personnel ==
- Al Green – vocals
- Tim Miner – keyboards, bass, backing vocals, arrangements
- Mark Stitts – keyboards, guitars, arrangements
- Gregory O'Quinn – acoustic piano, organ
- David Ebensberger – keyboards, arrangements
- John Wirtz – keyboards, drum programming
- Robert Wirtz – keyboards, drum programming
- Mike Stitts – drum programming, arrangements
- Paul Leim – drums
- Charlie Barnett – percussion
- Kirk Whalum – saxophone
- Rodney Booth – brass
- Ron Jones – brass, brass arrangements
- John Osborne – brass
- Larry Dalton – strings, string arrangements
- Karen Adams – backing vocals
- Cindy Cruse – backing vocals
- El DeBarge – backing vocals
- Walter Johnson – backing vocals
- Kindred – backing vocals
- Mike Wilson – backing vocals

Choir

- Karen Adams, Darryn Belieu, Yvonne Belieu, Cindy Cruse, David Ebensberger, Walter Johnson, Tim Miner, Karen Penrod, Tara Sipus, Mike Stitts and Mike Wilson

Production

- Tim Miner – producer, engineer, mixing
- Jeff Adams – engineer
- Mark Cassimatis – engineer
- David Ebensberger – engineer
- Gene Eichelberger – engineer
- Win Kutz – engineer, mixing
- Mark Stitts – engineer
- Mike Stitts – engineer
- Jeff Toone – engineer
- John Wirtz – engineer
- Robert Wirtz – engineer
- John Matousek – mastering
- Amy Linden – art direction
- Buddy Jackson – design
- Russ Harrington – photography
