= Precious Lord =

Studio album by Al Green
- Released: 1982
- Studios: Sound Emporium (Nashville, Tennessee)
- Genres: Gospel, pop
- Label: Myrrh
- Producer: Al Green

Al Green chronology
Tokyo Live (1981)	Precious Lord (1982)	I'll Rise Again (1983)

Precious Lord is an album by the American musician Al Green, released in 1982. It peaked at No. 1 on Billboard's Top Gospel Albums chart.

== Critical reception ==
Professional ratings
Review scores
Source	Rating
AllMusic	3/5 stars
Robert Christgau	B
The Encyclopedia of Popular Music	4/5 stars
The Rolling Stone Album Guide	3/5 stars

Robert Christgau thought that "the Memphis groove of Al's first two Myrrh albums had somehow turned into rote tent-gospel timekeeping." The New York Times wrote that "Green works audacious transformations on some of the most beloved gospel standards, turning them into bright, upbeat pop."

== Track listing ==
1. "Precious Lord" (Thomas A. Dorsey) - 3:12
2. "What a Friend We Have in Jesus" - 4:15
3. "The Old Rugged Cross" - 3:27
4. "Morningstar" (Moses Dillard, Sharon Michalsky) - 3:26
5. "How Great Thou Art" - 3:34
6. "Glory To His Name" - 2:57
7. "Rock of Ages" - 2:35
8. "In the Garden" - 3:59
9. "Hallelujah (I Just Want to Praise the Lord)" (Al Green, Moses Dillard) - 4:40

== Personnel ==
- Al Green – lead vocals, arrangements (2, 6, 7)
- David Briggs – keyboards
- Tony Brown – keyboards
- Kenny Bell – guitars
- Moses Dillard – guitars
- Bob Wray – bass
- Larrie Londin – drums
- Jerry Peters – horn and string arrangements
- The Nashville Hornworks – horns
- The "A" Strings – strings
- Anita Ball – backing vocals
- Francine Belcher – backing vocals
- Lea Jane Berinati – backing vocals
- Kim Fleming – backing vocals
- Vicki Hampton – backing vocals
- Bobby Jones – backing vocals
- Donna McElroy – backing vocals
- Temple Riser – backing vocals
- Karen Taylor – backing vocals

Production

- Al Green – producer
- Bill Cantrell – associate producer
- Quinton Claunch – associate producer
- Billy Sherrill – engineer, mixing
- Hank Williams – mastering at Woodland Studios (Nashville, Tennessee)
- Alan Messer – photography
