= Higher Plane (album) =

Studio album by Al Green
- Released: 1981
- Genres: Gospel, soul
- Label: Myrrh
- Producer: Al Green

Al Green chronology
Tokyo Live (1981)	Higher Plane (1981)	Precious Lord (1982)

Higher Plane is a gospel album by the American musician Al Green, released in 1981.

== Critical reception ==
Professional ratings
Review scores
Source	Rating
AllMusic	4/5 stars
Robert Christgau	A
The Rolling Stone Album Guide	4/5 stars

The New York Times noted the "first-rate songs and arrangements, a sure sense of its own style, and performances as rich in sensuality and erotic innuendo as any of Mr. Green's pop recordings."

== Track listing ==
1. "Higher Plane" (Keith Anthony Burke, Marshall Jones) - 3:37
2. "People Get Ready" (Curtis Mayfield) - 6:23
3. "By My Side" (Johnny Brown, Morgan Joseph) - 4:18
4. "The Spirit Might Come – On and On" (Burke, Joseph) - 5:23
5. "Where Love Rules" (Burke, Jean Burleson) - 5:13
6. "Amazing Grace" - 3:31
7. "His Name Is Jesus" (Burke, Burleson) - 5:26
8. "Battle Hymn of the Republic" - 2:32

== Personnel ==
- Al Green – lead and backing vocals, string arrangements
- Jesse Butler – keyboards
- Larry Lee – lead guitars
- Reuben Fairfax Jr. – bass
- Aaron Purdy – drums
- Jerry Peters – string arrangements
- Marjie Joseph – backing vocals
- Laura Lee – backing vocals
- Wanda Neal Bobo – backing vocals
- James Nelson – backing vocals

Production

- Producer – Al Green
- Engineers – Bill Cantrell and Fred Jordan
- Recorded at American Music Recording Studios (Memphis, TN)
- Coordinator – Jesse Butler
- Design – Dennis Hill
- Photography – Alan Messer
