= Hi Records =

American record label featuring R&B and soul music

- Parent company: ABS Entertainment Inc.
- Founded: 1957
- Founder: Ray Harris, Joe Cuoghi, Bill Cantrell, Quinton Claunch
- Distributors: Fat Possum Records (in the US, Canada, Australia); Crimson Productions (in the UK)
- Genre: Rhythm and blues, soul
- Country of origin: US
- Official website: hirecords.com

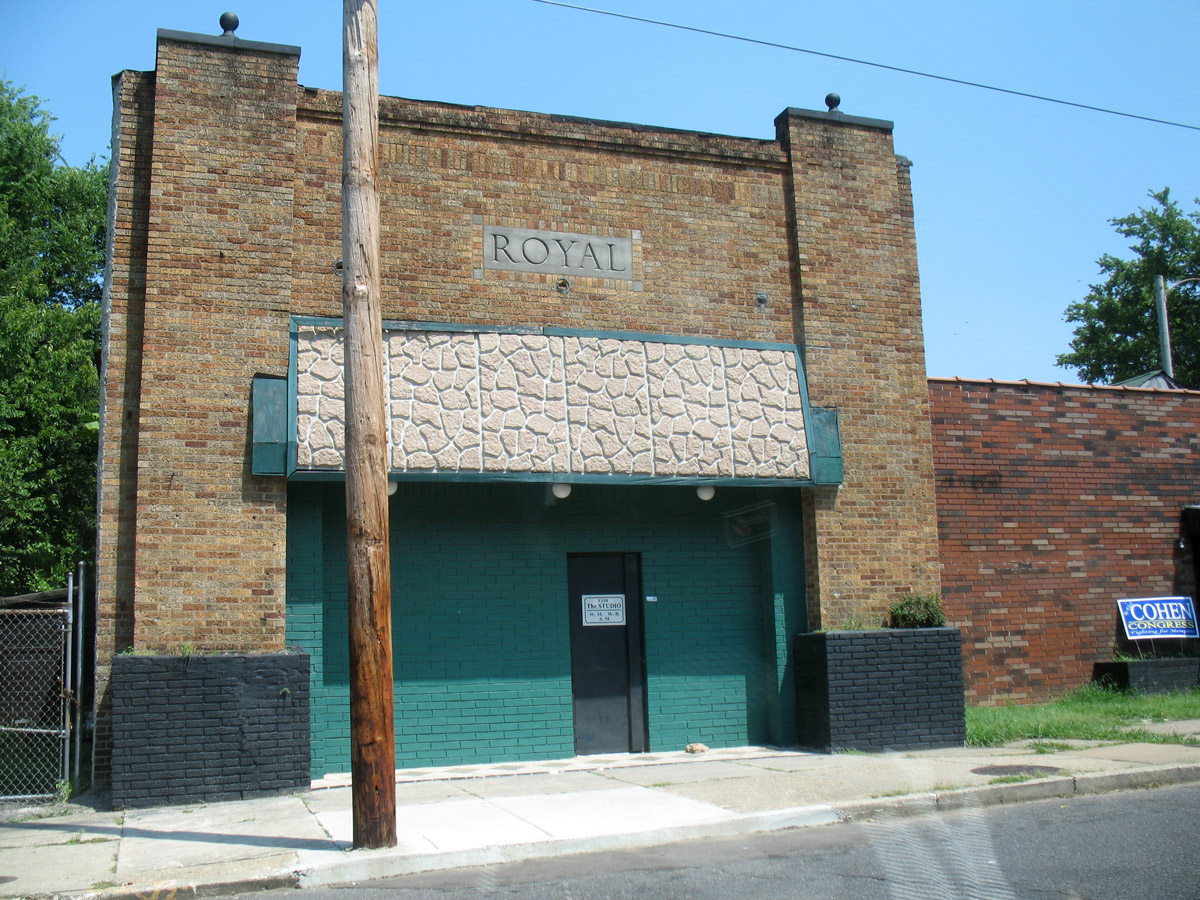
The Royal Recording Studios and Hi Recording Studio

Hi Records is an American soul music and rhythm & blues label founded in Memphis, Tennessee in 1957 by singer Ray Harris, record store owner Joe Cuoghi, Bill Cantrell and Quinton Claunch (formerly producers for Sun Records), and three silent partners, including Cuoghi's lawyer, Nick Pesce.

== History ==
Hi Records' first big hit was "Smokie Part 2", an instrumental by Bill Black's Combo, released in 1959. Black was a bass player with Elvis Presley and a long-time friend of Ray Harris. Founder Claunch was forced out of the label, selling his share in 1960 to Carl McVoy (a cousin of Jerry Lee Lewis), who had been involved with the label since its first recording and had worked with Bill Black. Willie Mitchell joined the label that year as a recording artist. In 1968 he began to produce Al Green. Bill Black's saxophonist, Ace Cannon, landed a hit with the single "Tuff" in 1961.

In 1970, when founder Joe Cuoghi died and Ray Harris retired, Nick Pesce became president; Willie Mitchell became vice-president. Hi Records' commercial peak was in the early 1970s, mainly due to the innovative and highly successful work of Al Green, whose hits on the label included "Tired of Being Alone", "Let's Stay Together", "I'm Still in Love with You", and "Call Me". Other artists on the label included O. V. Wright, Don Bryant, Otis Clay, and Ann Peebles. None reached the same level of success.

The label's music was mostly recorded at Willie Mitchell's Royal Studios, located in a renovated movie theater in South Memphis. The label was distributed nationally by London Records. On its numerous hit recordings of the 1970s, the label used a house backing band of local session musicians known as the Hi Rhythm Section. The popularity of disco music in the late 1970s led to a decline in the popularity of southern soul music.

Licensed distribution is by Crimson Productions (a division of Demon Music Group) in Europe; EMI licensed the catalog in Canada and the United States until 2009, when Fat Possum Records began distributing for the United States, Canada and Australia. Before EMI, Motown Records distributed Hi's back catalog from the 1980s to the mid-1990s, consisting mostly Green's and Mitchell's albums.

The Royal Recording Studios, also Hi Recording Studio, was located at an old movie theatre, at 1320 South Lauderdale Street, founded by the owners of Hi Records; several hit singles were recorded here.

== Notable artists ==
- Al Green
- Don Bryant
- O. V. Wright
- Otis Clay
- Ann Peebles
- Quiet Elegance
- Syl Johnson
- Bill Black's Combo
- Al Perkins
- Ace Cannon
- Willie Mitchell

== See also ==
- List of record labels
- Goldwax Records
- Stax Records
- FAME Studios
- Muscle Shoals Rhythm Section
- R&B
- Memphis Soul Music
