= Willie Mitchell (musician) =

American trumpeter, arranger and record producer (1928–2010)

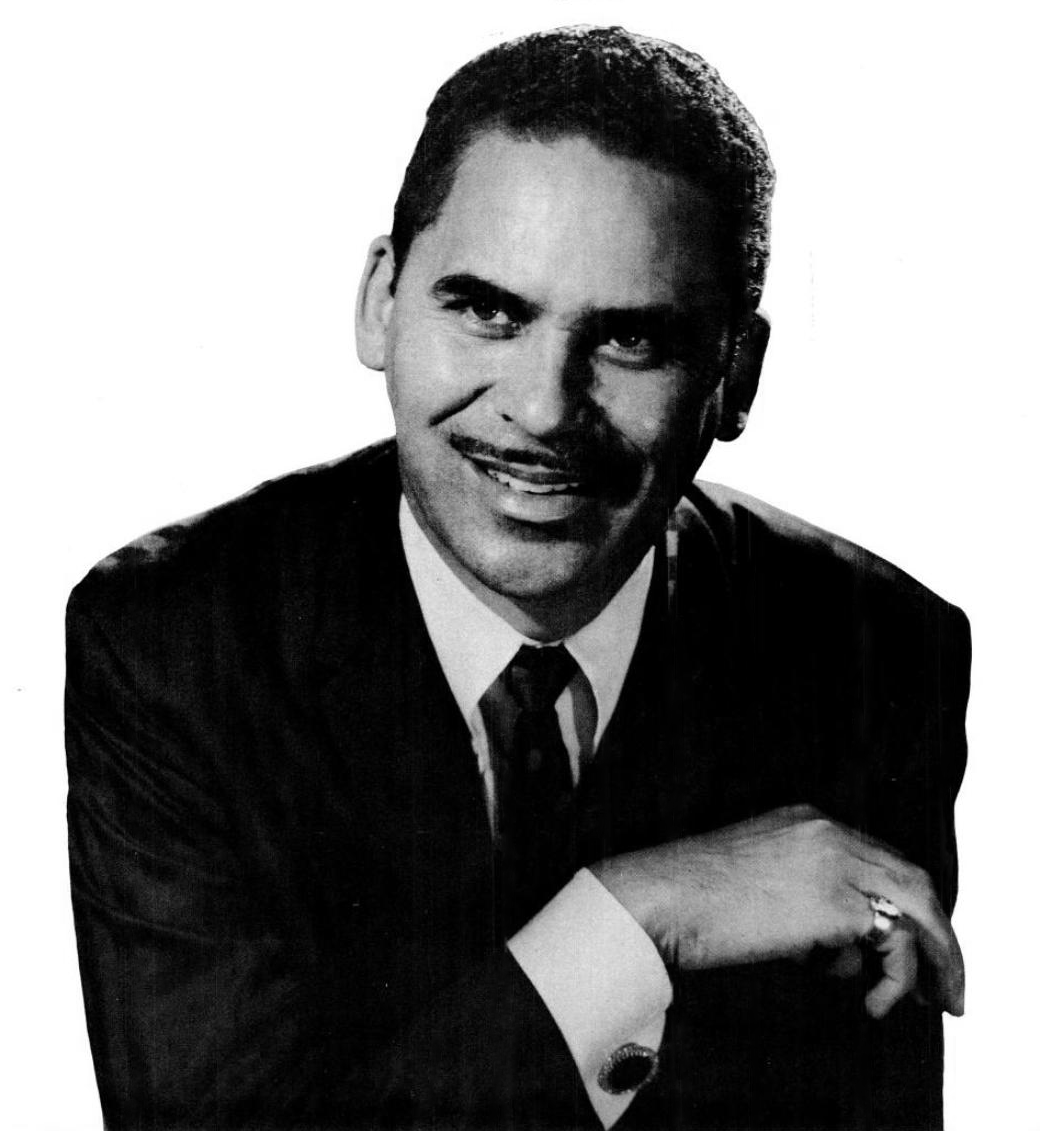
- Mitchell in 1966

Background information
- Born: William Lawrence Mitchell; March 1, 1928; Ashland, Mississippi, U.S
- Origin: Memphis, Tennessee, U.S.
- Died: January 5, 2010 (aged 81); Memphis, Tennessee, U.S.
- Genres: Soul, R&B, rock and roll, pop, funk
- Occupations: Singer, bandleader, record producer, arranger
- Instruments: Vocals, trumpet
- Label: Hi Records

William Lawrence Mitchell (March 1, 1928 – January 5, 2010) was an American trumpeter, bandleader, soul, R&B, rock and roll, pop and funk record producer and arranger who ran Royal Studios in Memphis, Tennessee. He was best known for his Hi Records label of the 1970s, which released albums by a large stable of popular Memphis soul artists, including Mitchell himself, Al Green, O. V. Wright, Syl Johnson, Ann Peebles, Lee Rogers and Quiet Elegance.

== Biography ==
Born and raised in Ashland, Mississippi, Mitchell moved to Memphis when he was in high school. He attended Rust College. At the age of eight, he began to play the trumpet. While in high school, he was a featured player in popular local big bands. He served in the US Army and moved back to Memphis in 1954.

He later formed his own combo, which from time to time included musicians such as trumpeter Booker Little, saxophonists Charles Lloyd, and George Coleman, and pianist Phineas Newborn, Jr.

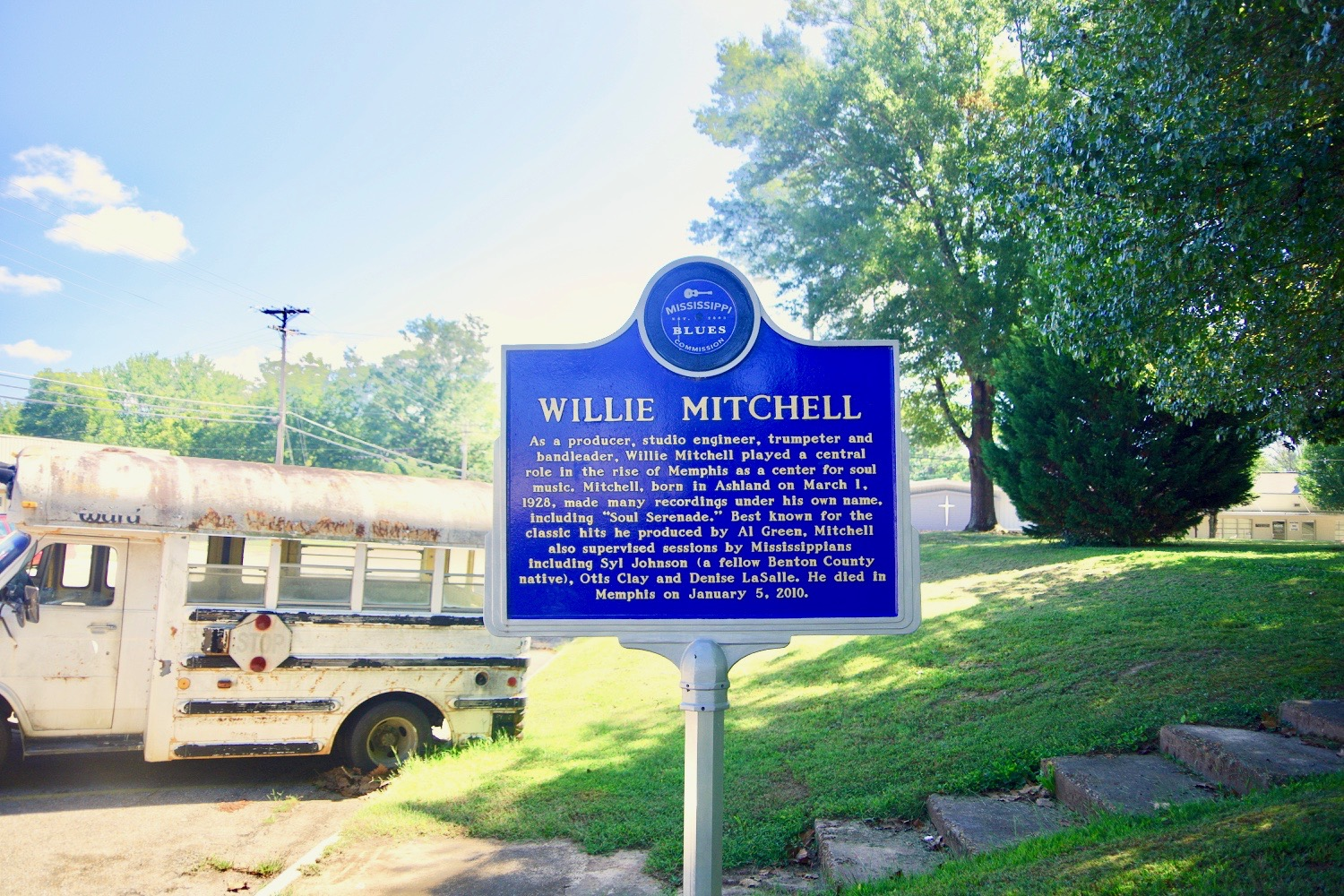
Mississippi Blues Trail marker dedicated to Mitchell in Ashland

Mitchell landed a job with the Home of the Blues record label as a producer, then left to join Hi Records in 1961 as both a recording artist and a producer.

Known at the recording studio as "Papa Willie", Mitchell earned his nickname by taking over the reins of Hi Records in 1970 and guiding it through its most successful period. He produced numerous hits for Al Green in the 1970s. Mitchell's productions have been much noted for featuring a hard-hitting bass drum sound (usually played by pioneering Memphis drummer Al Jackson, Jr. of Booker T. & the M.G.'s).

A trumpeter and bandleader in his own right, Mitchell released a number of popular singles for Hi Records as an artist in the 1960s, including "Soul Serenade." It peaked at number 43 in the UK Singles Chart in April 1968.

Through the 1980s, Mitchell ran his own independent record label, Waylo Records. Acts on the label included Billy Always and Lynn White.

In 1987, Joyce Cobb recorded several singles for Waylo, one of which made it to No. 3 on the British R&B chart: "Another Lonely Night (Without You)", while in 1987, Mitchell worked on a version of Wet Wet Wet's debut album, which was issued in 1988 as The Memphis Sessions.

He and Al Green revived their successful recording partnership in 2003 when Green recorded I Can't Stop, his first collaboration with Mitchell since 1985's He is the Light. Their 2005 follow-up project was Everything's OK.

In 2004, Willie Mitchell Boulevard was named for him. He was given a lifetime achievement award by the Grammys in 2009.

Mitchell died in Memphis on January 5, 2010, from a cardiac arrest. He was 81. His final work was producing the final Solomon Burke studio album, Nothing's Impossible, released in June 2010.

== Discography ==
- 1963: Sunrise Serenade
- 1964: 20-75
- 1964: Hold It
- 1965: It's Dance Time
- 1966: It's What's Happenin'
- 1966: The Hit Sound Of Willie Mitchell
- 1967: Ooh Baby, You Turn Me On
- 1968: Willie Mitchell Live at the Royal
- 1968: Soul Serenade
- 1969: On Top
- 1969: Solid Soul
- 1969: Soul Bag
- 1970: Robbin's Nest
- 1970: The Many Moods of Willie Mitchell
- 1971: Listen Dance
- 1977: Willie Mitchell Live
- 1981: Willie Willie Willie
- 1986: That Driving Beat
- 2001: Poppa Willie The Hi Years / 1962-74
- 2003: Walkin' With Willie
- 2008: Best Damn Fool (with Buddy Guy)

=== Singles ===
Year	Title	Chart positions			
Year	Title	US	US R&B	CAN	UK
1964	"20-75"	31	32	32	—
1964	"Percolatin'"	85	—	—	—
1965	"Buster Browne"	96	29	—	—
1965	"Everything Is Gonna Be Alright"	126	—	—	—
1966	"Bad Eye"	92	23	—	—
1966	"Mercy"	127	—	—	—
1967	"Slippin' and Slidin'"	96	—	—	—
1968	"Soul Serenade"^{A}	23	10	21	43
1968	"Prayer Meetin'"	45	23	78	—
1968	"Up-Hard"	91	—	—	—
1969	"30-60-90"	69	31	90	—
1969	"Young People"	120	—	—	—
1969	"My Babe"	115	37	—	—
1976	"The Champion"	—	—	—	47

- ^{A}"Soul Serenade" peaked at number 32 on Billboard Adult Contemporary chart
