= Paul Young discography =

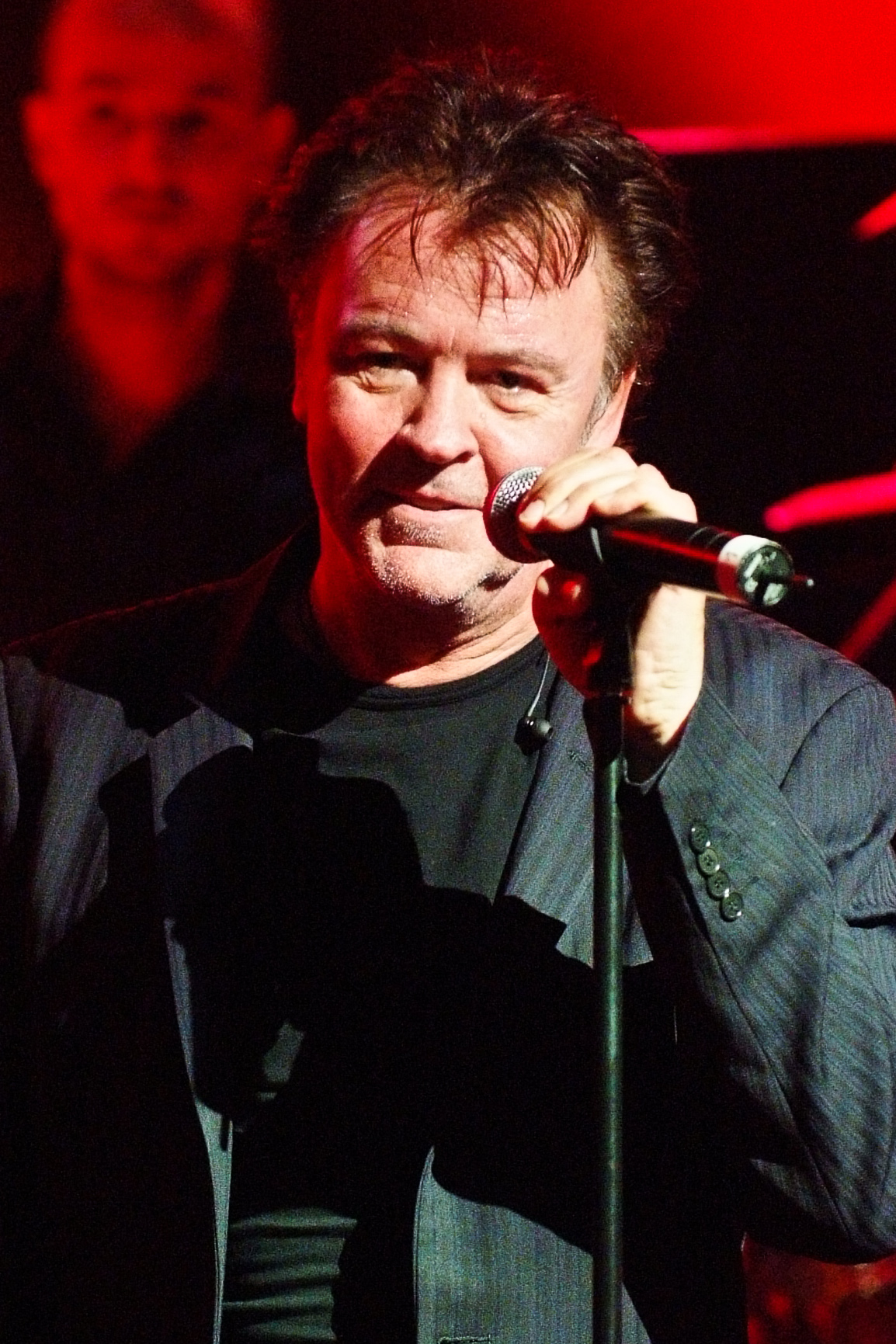
- Paul Young performing in Kiel, October 2009
- Studio albums: 10
- Live albums: 3
- Compilation albums: 15
- Singles: 38
- Video albums: 2
- Music videos: 27
- Promotional singles: 8
- Box sets: 4

The discography of English singer Paul Young consists of nine studio albums, two live albums, 15 compilation albums, and 36 singles. Following short stints in several groups, Young became known in the 1980s for his baritone voice.

From 1983 to 1993, all of Young's studio albums were released during a contract he had with Columbia Records, and since 1994, Young has released albums through Vision, East West and Sony BMG Records. Four of Young's albums, No Parlez (1983), The Secret of Association (1985), Between Two Fires (1986), and Other Voices (1990) feature Welsh bassist Pino Palladino.

The subsequent release by Young, The Crossing (1993), was produced by Don Was and featured a rhythm section with the late Jeff Porcaro on drums, along with Palladino, James "Hutch" Hutchinson, and Freddie Washington on bass.

== Albums ==
=== Studio albums ===
| Title | Album details | Peak chart positions | | | | | | | | | | Certifications |
| Title | Album details | UK | AUS | CAN | GER | ITA | NL | NZ | SWE | SWI | US | Certifications |
|---|---|---|---|---|---|---|---|---|---|---|---|---|
| No Parlez | Released: 22 July 1983; Label: CBS, Columbia; Formats: CD, LP, MC | 1 | 12 | 69 | 1 | 1 | 1 | 3 | 1 | 1 | 79 | UK: 3× Platinum; AUS: Platinum; CAN: Gold; GER: Platinum; NL: Platinum; NZ: Platinum |
| The Secret of Association | Released: 25 March 1985; Label: CBS, Columbia; Formats: CD, LP, MC | 1 | 6 | 6 | 6 | 5 | 1 | 3 | 1 | 4 | 19 | UK: 2× Platinum; AUS: Platinum; CAN: 2× Platinum; NZ: Platinum; US: Gold |
| Between Two Fires | Released: 20 October 1986; Label: CBS, Columbia; Formats: CD, LP, MC | 4 | 40 | 35 | 63 | 11 | 23 | 39 | 19 | 27 | 77 | UK: Platinum |
| Other Voices | Released: 4 June 1990; Label: CBS, Columbia; Formats: CD, LP, MC | 4 | 102 | 35 | — | 18 | 51 | — | 40 | — | 142 | UK: Gold |
| The Crossing | Released: 11 October 1993; Label: CBS, Columbia; Formats: CD, LP, MC, MD | 27 | — | — | 82 | — | 65 | — | — | — | — | |
| Reflections | Released: 14 November 1994; Label: Vision; Formats: CD, MC | 64 | — | — | — | — | 39 | — | — | — | — | |
| Paul Young | Released: 19 May 1997; Label: EastWest; Formats: CD, LP, MC | 39 | — | — | 90 | — | — | — | — | — | — | |
| Rock Swings – On the Wild Side of Swing | Released: 27 October 2006; Label: Maxi Media/Sony BMG; Formats: CD; Germany-only release | — | — | — | 89 | — | — | — | — | — | — | |
| Good Thing | Released: 15 April 2016; Label: New State Music/Baked Recordings; Formats: CD, LP, digital download | 87 | — | — | — | — | — | — | — | — | — | |
| Behind the Lens | Released: 5 May 2023; Label: Townsend Music Limited / Crosscut Saw Records; Formats: CD, LP, digital download | — | — | — | — | — | — | — | — | — | — | |
"—" denotes releases that did not chart or were not released in that territory.

=== Live albums ===
| Title | Album details |
|---|---|
| The Live Edition | Released: 21 March 1985; Label: Epic; Formats: LP; Japan-only release |
| Live | Released: 2006; Label: LaserLight Digital; Formats: CD; Germany-only release |
| Live at Rockpalast 1985 (with the Royal Family) | Released: 27 September 2019; Label: MIG; Formats: CD+DVD; Germany-only release |

=== Compilation albums ===
| Title | Album details | Peak chart positions | | | | | | | | | Certifications |
| Title | Album details | UK | AUS | CAN | DEN | GER | ITA | NL | NZ | SWE | Certifications |
|---|---|---|---|---|---|---|---|---|---|---|---|
| From Time to Time – The Singles Collection | Released: 2 September 1991; Label: Columbia; Formats: CD, LP, MC | 1 | 6 | 48 | 1 | 32 | 14 | 3 | 2 | 6 | UK: 3× Platinum; AUS: Gold; NL: Platinum; NZ: Platinum; SWE: Platinum |
| Love Hurts | Released: 1993; Label: Success; Formats: CD; Recordings with Q-Tips | — | — | — | — | — | — | — | — | — | |
| Star Box | Released: 21 November 1993; Label: Epic; Formats: CD; Japan-only release | — | — | — | — | — | — | — | — | — | |
| Best Ballads | Released: 6 February 1995; Label: Columbia; Formats: CD, MC, MD; Re-released in the UK in 1996 as Love Songs | 93 | — | — | — | 36 | — | 40 | — | — | |
| Super Hits | Released: July 1998; Label: Columbia/Legacy; Formats: CD, MC; Re-released in 2006 as Collections | — | — | — | — | — | — | — | — | — | |
| Simply the Best | Released: November 1999; Label: Columbia; Formats: CD; Germany-only release | — | — | — | — | — | — | — | — | — | |
| Love Will Tear Us Apart | Released: 2001; Label: Columbia; Formats: 2xCD; Germany-only release | — | — | — | — | — | — | — | — | — | |
| Greatest Hits | Released: August 2002; Label: Columbia; Formats: CD | — | — | — | 16 | — | — | — | — | — | |
| The Essential Paul Young | Released: 9 June 2003; Label: Sony Music/Columbia; Formats: CD | 27 | — | — | — | — | — | — | — | — | |
| The Only Paul Young Album You'll Ever Need | Released: 17 October 2005; Label: Sony BMG/Columbia; Formats: CD | — | — | — | — | — | — | — | — | — | |
| Everytime You Go Away | Released: April 2006; Label: Sony BMG; Formats: CD; US-only release | — | — | — | — | — | — | — | — | — | |
| Hit Collection | Released: January 2008; Label: Sony BMG; Formats: 2xCD; Germany-only release | — | — | — | — | — | — | — | — | — | |
| Wherever I Leave My Hat – The Best of Paul Young | Released: February 2008; Label: Music Club Deluxe; Formats: 2xCD | — | — | — | — | — | — | — | — | — | |
| Remixes and Rarities | Released: 8 July 2013; Label: Cherry Pop; Formats: 2xCD, digital download | — | — | — | — | — | — | — | — | — | |
| Greatest Hits – Japanese Singles Collection | Released: 29 May 2019; Label: Sony; Formats: CD+DVD; Japan-only release | — | — | — | — | — | — | — | — | — | |
"—" denotes releases that did not chart or were not released in that territory.

=== Box sets ===
| Title | Album details |
|---|---|
| 123 | Released: 1991; Label: Columbia; Formats: 3xCD |
| Original Album Classics | Released: January 2012; Label: Sony Music/Legacy/Columbia; Formats: 5xCD |
| Tomb of Memories – The CBS Years 1982–1994 | Released: 21 August 2015; Label: Columbia/Sony Music; Formats: 4xCD, digital download |
| The CBS Singles Collection 1982–1994 | Released: 25 January 2019; Label: Edsel; Formats: 19xCDS+DVD |

== Singles ==
| Title | Year | Peak chart positions | | | | | | | | | | Certifications | Album |
| Title | Year | UK | AUS | BEL (FL) | CAN | GER | IRE | ITA | NL | NZ | US | Certifications | Album |
|---|---|---|---|---|---|---|---|---|---|---|---|---|---|
| "Iron Out the Rough Spots" | 1982 | — | — | — | — | — | — | — | — | — | — | | No Parlez |
| "Love of the Common People" (with the Family) | 1983 | 102 | — | — | — | — | — | — | — | — | — | | No Parlez |
| "Wherever I Lay My Hat (That's My Home)" | 1983 | 1 | 9 | 37 | 26 | 19 | 1 | 19 | 48 | 4 | 70 | UK: Gold | No Parlez |
| "Come Back and Stay" | 1983 | 4 | 18 | 1 | 42 | 1 | 3 | — | 2 | 1 | 22 | UK: Silver; GER: Gold | No Parlez |
| "Love of the Common People" (re-release) | 1983 | 2 | 8 | 1 | — | 5 | 1 | 1 | 1 | 10 | 45 | UK: Gold | No Parlez |
| "Love Will Tear Us Apart" (Continental Europe and Australia-only release) | 1984 | — | — | 9 | — | 40 | — | — | 9 | — | — | | No Parlez |
| "I'm Gonna Tear Your Playhouse Down" | 1984 | 9 | 25 | 11 | — | 37 | 8 | 25 | 17 | 18 | — | | The Secret of Association |
| "Everything Must Change" | 1984 | 9 | 27 | 25 | 46 | 28 | 6 | — | 23 | 42 | 56 | UK: Silver | The Secret of Association |
| "Every Time You Go Away" | 1985 | 4 | 20 | 18 | 1 | 40 | 2 | 5 | 16 | 14 | 1 | UK: Silver; CAN: Gold; US: Gold | The Secret of Association |
| "Tomb of Memories" | 1985 | 16 | 44 | 27 | — | — | 6 | 22 | 39 | — | — | | The Secret of Association |
| "I'm Gonna Tear Your Playhouse Down" (re-release) | 1985 | 88 | — | — | 16 | — | — | — | — | — | 13 | | The Secret of Association |
| "Wonderland" | 1986 | 24 | 51 | 11 | — | — | 4 | 10 | 22 | — | — | | Between Two Fires |
| "Some People" | 1986 | 56 | — | 28 | 72 | — | 19 | — | — | — | 65 | | Between Two Fires |
| "Why Does a Man Have to Be Strong?" | 1987 | 63 | — | — | — | — | 25 | — | — | — | — | | Between Two Fires |
| "War Games" (Canada-only release) | 1987 | — | — | — | — | — | — | — | — | — | — | | Between Two Fires |
| "In the Long Run" (Continental Europe-only release) | 1987 | — | — | — | — | — | — | — | — | — | — | | Between Two Fires |
| "Softly Whispering I Love You" | 1990 | 21 | 102 | 40 | — | — | 16 | — | 44 | — | — | | Other Voices |
| "Oh Girl" | 1990 | 25 | 111 | 30 | 4 | — | 20 | — | 73 | 41 | 8 | | Other Voices |
| "Heaven Can Wait" | 1990 | 71 | 157 | — | — | — | — | — | — | — | — | | Other Voices |
| "Calling You" | 1990 | 57 | — | — | — | — | — | — | — | — | — | | Other Voices |
| "Senza una donna (Without a Woman)" (with Zucchero) | 1991 | 4 | 42 | 1 | 14 | 2 | 2 | — | 2 | — | — | ITA: Gold | From Time to Time – The Singles Collection (Note: "Come On In" was only included on the Japanese edition of From Time to Time.) |
| "Both Sides Now" (with Clannad) | 1991 | 74 | 158 | — | 64 | — | 3 | — | 41 | — | — | | From Time to Time – The Singles Collection |
| "Don't Dream It's Over" (with Paul Carrack) | 1991 | 20 | 114 | 48 | — | 71 | 13 | — | 67 | — | — | | From Time to Time – The Singles Collection |
| "Come On In" (with Masayuki Suzuki; Japan-only release) | 1991 | — | — | — | — | — | — | — | — | — | — | | From Time to Time – The Singles Collection |
| "I'm Only Foolin' Myself" (Continental Europe-only release) | 1992 | — | — | — | — | — | — | — | — | — | — | | From Time to Time – The Singles Collection |
| "What Becomes of the Brokenhearted" (North America and New Zealand-only release) | 1992 | — | — | — | 6 | — | — | — | — | 46 | 22 | | Fried Green Tomatoes: Original Motion Picture Soundtrack |
| "Now I Know What Made Otis Blue" | 1993 | 14 | — | — | — | 51 | — | — | 36 | 38 | — | | The Crossing |
| "Hope in a Hopeless World" | 1993 | 42 | — | — | — | 51 | — | — | — | — | — | | The Crossing |
| "It Will Be You" | 1994 | 34 | — | — | — | — | — | — | — | — | — | | The Crossing |
| "That's How Heartaches Are Made" | 1994 | 118 | — | — | — | — | — | — | — | — | — | | Reflections |
| "Grazing in the Grass" | 1995 | 144 | — | — | — | — | — | — | — | — | — | | Reflections |
| "I Wish You Love" | 1997 | 33 | — | — | — | 82 | — | — | — | — | — | | Paul Young |
| "Ball & Chain" | 1997 | — | — | — | — | 92 | — | — | — | — | — | | Paul Young |
| "Make Someone Happy" (Continental Europe-only release) | 1997 | — | — | — | — | — | — | — | — | — | — | | Paul Young |
| "Come Back" (with Chicane) | 2010 | 151 | — | — | — | — | — | — | — | — | — | | Giants (Chicane album) |
| "L-O-V-E (Love)" | 2016 | — | — | — | — | — | — | — | — | — | — | | Good Thing |
| "I Believe in You (You Believe in Me)" | 2016 | — | — | — | — | — | — | — | — | — | — | | Good Thing |
| "When The Stars Go Blue" | 2023 | — | — | — | — | — | — | — | — | — | — | | Behind The Lens |
"—" denotes releases that did not chart or were not released in that territory.

=== Promotional singles ===
| Title | Year | Album |
|---|---|---|
| "Bite the Hand That Feeds" (Australia-only release) | 1985 | The Secret of Association |
| "Medley: It's the Same Old Song, I Can't Help Myself, Reach Out I'll Be There" (with Phil Collins; France-only release) | 1989 | The Royal Concert |
| "I'm Your Puppet" (with Elton John; Brazil-only release) | 1994 | Duets |
| "Until You Come Back to Me" (Japan-only release) | 1994 | Reflections |
| The Singles (EP; Netherlands-only release) | 1995 | Non-album single |
| "Tularosa" | 1997 | Paul Young |
| "Hard Cargo" (Continental Europe-only release) | 1997 | Paul Young |
| "When the Work Is Done" (with Sulo; Sweden-only release) | 2016 | Sulo's Brilliant Outsiders |

== Videos ==
=== Video albums ===
| Title | Album details |
|---|---|
| The Video Singles | Released: April 1985; Label: CMV Enterprises, CBS Fox Video; Formats: VHS, Beta, LD |
| From Time to Time – The Video Collection | Released: November 1991; Label: SMV Enterprises; Formats: VHS, LD |

=== Music videos ===
| Title | Year | Director |
|---|---|---|
| "Love of the Common People" | 1983 | Vaughan Arnell |
| "Wherever I Lay My Hat (That's My Home)" | 1983 | Storm Thorgerson |
| "Come Back and Stay" | 1983 | Storm Thorgerson |
| "Love of the Common People" (Version 2) | 1983 | Storm Thorgerson |
| "I'm Gonna Tear Your Playhouse Down" | 1984 | Stephen Priest |
| "Everything Must Change" | 1984 | Godley & Creme |
| "Every Time You Go Away" | 1985 | Nick Morris |
| "Every Time You Go Away" (Version 2) | 1985 | David Mallet |
| "Tomb of Memories" | 1985 | Nick Morris |
| "Wonderland" | 1986 | Nick Morris |
| "Some People" | 1986 | Nick Morris |
| "Why Does a Man Have to Be Strong?" | 1986 | Unknown |
| "Softly Whispering I Love You" | 1990 | Neil Abramson |
| "Oh Girl" | 1990 | Vaughan Arnell & Anthea Benton |
| "Heaven Can Wait" | 1990 | Paula Greif |
| "Calling You" | 1991 | Douglas Brothers |
| "Senza una donna (Without a Woman)" | 1991 | Russell Young |
| "Both Sides Now" | 1991 | Douglas Brothers |
| "Don't Dream It's Over" | 1991 | Douglas Brothers |
| "Come On In" | 1991 | Douglas Brothers |
| "Now I Know What Made Otis Blue" | 1993 | Michael Geoghegan |
| "Hope in a Hopeless World" | 1993 | Paul Boyd |
| "That's How Heartaches Are Made" | 1994 | Unknown |
| "It Will Be You" | 1994 | Unknown |
| "Ball & Chain" | 1997 | Unknown |
| "I Wish You Love" | 1997 | Unknown |
| "L-O-V-E (Love)" | 2016 | Unknown |
