= From Time to Time – The Singles Collection =

Compilation album by Paul Young
- Released: 2 September 1991
- Genre: Pop
- Length: 61:18 (LP) 66:00 (CD)
- Label: Columbia

Paul Young chronology
Other Voices (1990)	From Time to Time – The Singles Collection (1991)	The Crossing (1993)

Singles from From Time to Time – The Singles Collection
- 1. "Senza una donna (Without a Woman)" Released: 18 March 1991; 2. "Both Sides Now" Released: 29 July 1991; 3. "Don't Dream It's Over" Released: 14 October 1991; 4. "Come On In (with Masayuki Suzuki)" Released: 1991 (Japan-only release); 5. "I'm Only Foolin' Myself" Released: 1991 (Continental Europe-only release)

Professional ratings
Review scores
Source	Rating
AllMusic	4/5 stars

From Time to Time – The Singles Collection is a compilation album by the English singer Paul Young. Released in 1991, it was Young's first "greatest hits" collection, compiling tracks from the past decade.

The album entered the UK Albums Chart at number one (Young's third and final UK number one album to date) and has been certified Triple Platinum by the British Phonographic Industry for UK sales in excess of 900,000 copies.

The album featured tracks from all of Young's previous four studio albums as well as four tracks not previously released on a Young album: "I'm Only Foolin' Myself", "Senza una donna", "Don't Dream It's Over" and "Both Sides Now". "Both Sides Now" which featured Clannad, was an edited version of the track on the soundtrack to the film Switch.

A mastering error on some CD copies divided the track "Both Sides Now" into two sections. Exactly 2:00 of "Both Sides Now" appears at the end of track 11, before the song concludes on track 12.

== Track listing ==
No.	Title	Writer(s)	Album	Length
1.	"Everytime You Go Away"	Daryl Hall	The Secret of Association	4:26
2.	"Come Back and Stay"	Jack Lee	No Parlez	4:23
3.	"I'm Only Foolin' Myself"	Charlie Midnight, Dan Hartman	Previously unreleased	4:35
4.	"Senza una donna (Without a Woman)" (feat. Zucchero)	Adelmo "Zucchero" Fornaciari, Frank Musker	Previously unreleased	4:26
5.	"I'm Gonna Tear Your Playhouse Down"	Earl Randle	The Secret of Association	4:46
6.	"Broken Man"	Paul Young, Ian Kewley	No Parlez	3:54
7.	"Everything Must Change"	Young, Kewley	The Secret of Association	5:31
8.	"Wonderland"	Betsy Cook	Between Two Fires	5:01
9.	"Don't Dream It's Over" (feat. Paul Carrack)	Neil Finn	Previously unreleased	4:22
10.	"Love of the Common People"	John Hurley and Ronnie Wilkins	No Parlez	3:41
11.	"Wherever I Lay My Hat (That's My Home)"	Marvin Gaye, Barrett Strong, Norman Whitfield	No Parlez	4:10
12.	"Both Sides Now" (feat. Clannad )	Joni Mitchell	Previously unreleased	4:46
13.	"Some People" ((CD issue only))	Young, Kewley	Between Two Fires	4:42
14.	"Oh Girl"	Eugene Record	Other Voices	3:34
15.	"Softly Whispering I Love You"	Roger Cook, Roger Greenaway	Other Voices	3:43

== Charts ==
Chart performance for From Time to Time
Chart (1991–92)	Peak position
Australian Albums (ARIA)	6
Belgian Albums (IFPI)	2
Danish Albums (IFPI)	1
Dutch Albums (Album Top 100)	3
European Albums (IFPI)	8
Finnish Albums (Suomen virallinen lista)	8
German Albums (Offizielle Top 100)	32
Irish Albums (IRMA)	2
New Zealand Albums (RMNZ)	2
Norwegian Albums (VG-lista)	2
Swedish Albums (Sverigetopplistan)	6
UK Albums (OCC)	1

== Certifications ==
Certifications and sales for From Time to Time
Region	Certification	Certified units/sales
Australia (ARIA)	Gold	35,000^{^}
France (SNEP)	Platinum	300,000^{*}
Netherlands (NVPI)	Platinum	100,000^{^}
New Zealand (RMNZ)	Platinum	15,000^{^}
Sweden (GLF)	Platinum	140,000
United Kingdom (BPI)	3× Platinum	900,000^{^}
Summaries
Europe (IFPI)	Platinum	1,000,000^{*}
^{*} Sales figures based on certification alone.^{^} Shipments figures based on certification alone.
