= List of number-one airplay songs of 1993 (Italy) =

This is a list of the songs which topped the Italian Airplay chart on Music & Media during 1993.

== Chart history ==
Issue date	Song	Artist
9 January	"Sleeping Satellite"	Tasmin Archer
16 January	"Sleeping Satellite"	Tasmin Archer
23 January	"I Will Always Love You"	Whitney Houston
30 January	"I Will Always Love You"	Whitney Houston
6 February	"I Will Always Love You"	Whitney Houston
13 February	"Hope of Deliverance"	Paul McCartney
20 February	"If I Ever Lose My Faith in You"	Sting
27 February	"If I Ever Lose My Faith in You"	Sting
6 March	"If I Ever Lose My Faith in You"	Sting
13 March	"If I Ever Lose My Faith in You"	Sting
20 March	"I Feel You"	Depeche Mode
27 March	"Jump They Say"	David Bowie
3 April	"Jump They Say"	David Bowie
10 April	"If I Ever Lose My Faith in You"	Sting
17 April	"If I Ever Lose My Faith in You"	Sting
24 April	"Jump They Say"	David Bowie
1 May	"Jump They Say"	David Bowie
8 May	"Regret"	New Order
15 May	"Regret"	New Order
22 May	"Regret"	New Order
29 May	"Regret"	New Order
5 June	"I Don't Wanna Fight"	Tina Turner
12 June	"I Don't Wanna Fight"	Tina Turner
19 June	"I Don't Wanna Fight"	Tina Turner
26 June	"I Don't Wanna Fight"	Tina Turner
3 July	"Break It Down Again"	Tears for Fears
10 July	"What Is Love"	Haddaway
17 July	"Numb"	U2
24 July	"Break It Down Again"	Tears for Fears
31 July	"Numb"	U2
7 August	"Numb"	U2
14 August	"Numb"	U2
21 August	"Numb"	U2
28 August	"Numb"	U2
4 September	"Numb"	U2
11 September	"The River of Dreams"	Billy Joel
18 September	"The River of Dreams"	Billy Joel
25 September	"The River of Dreams"	Billy Joel
2 October	"The River of Dreams"	Billy Joel
9 October	"Dreamlover"	Mariah Carey
16 October	"Dreamlover"	Mariah Carey
23 October	"Now I Know What Made Otis Blue"	Paul Young
30 October	"Now I Know What Made Otis Blue"	Paul Young
6 November	"Now I Know What Made Otis Blue"	Paul Young
13 November	"Both Sides of the Story"	Phil Collins
20 November	"Both Sides of the Story"	Phil Collins
27 November	"Both Sides of the Story"	Phil Collins
4 December	"Both Sides of the Story"	Phil Collins
11 December	"Both Sides of the Story"	Phil Collins
18 December	"Both Sides of the Story"	Phil Collins

=== Songs with the most weeks at number one ===
A total of fifteen songs have reached number one during this year. The song which had spent the most weeks at number-one is "Numb" by U2, staying at the top for 7 non-consecutive weeks: the first on July 17 and the remaining six from July 31 to September 4.

Weeks at No. 1	Song	Artist
7	"Numb"	U2
6	"If I Ever Lose My Faith in You"	Sting
6	"Both Sides of the Story"	Phil Collins
4	"Jump They Say"	David Bowie
4	"Regret"	New Order
4	"I Don't Wanna Fight"	Tina Turner
4	"The River of Dreams"	Billy Joel
3	"I Will Always Love You"	Whitney Houston
3	"Now I Know What Made Otis Blue"	Paul Young
2	"Sleeping Satellite"	Tasmin Archer
2	"Break It Down Again"	Tears for Fears
2	"Dreamlover"	Mariah Carey
1	"Hope of Deliverance"	Paul McCartney
1	"I Feel You"	Depeche Mode
1	"What Is Love"	Haddaway

=== Songs peaking at number two ===
Issue date	Song	Artist	Kept out of number-one position by
23 January	"Would I Lie to You?"	Charles & Eddie	"I Will Always Love You" (Whitney Houston)
30 January	"Would I Lie to You?"	Charles & Eddie	"I Will Always Love You" (Whitney Houston)
6 February	"Would I Lie to You?"	Charles & Eddie	"I Will Always Love You" (Whitney Houston)
27 February	"Ordinary World"	Duran Duran	"If I Ever Lose My Faith in You" (Sting)
6 March	"Sweet Harmony"	The Beloved	"If I Ever Lose My Faith in You" (Sting)
13 March	"Sweet Thing"	Mick Jagger	"If I Ever Lose My Faith in You" (Sting)
20 March	"Sweet Harmony"	The Beloved	"I Feel You" (Depeche Mode)
3 April	"I Put a Spell on You"	Bryan Ferry	"Jump They Say" (David Bowie)
17 April	"I Put a Spell on You"	Bryan Ferry	"If I Ever Lose My Faith in You" (Sting)
24 April	"Come Undone"	Duran Duran	"Jump They Say" (David Bowie)
15 May	"Somebody to Love"	George Michael and Queen	"Regret" (New Order)
19 June	"That's the Way Love Goes"	Janet Jackson	"I Don't Wanna Fight" (Tina Turner)
31 July	"Dreams"	Gabrielle	"Numb" (U2)
21 August	"Dreams"	Gabrielle	"Numb" (U2)
18 September	"Cold"	Tears for Fears	"The River of Dreams" (Billy Joel)
23 October	"Peach"	Prince	"Now I Know What Made Otis Blue" (Paul Young)
30 October	"Peach"	Prince	"Now I Know What Made Otis Blue" (Paul Young)
4 December	"So Natural"	Lisa Stansfield	"Both Sides of the Story" (Phil Collins)
11 December	"Please Forgive Me"	Bryan Adams	"Both Sides of the Story" (Phil Collins)
18 December	"Please Forgive Me"	Bryan Adams	"Both Sides of the Story" (Phil Collins)

== See also ==
- 1993 in music
