= List of number-one singles of 1983 (Ireland) =

This is a list of singles which have reached number one on the Irish Singles Chart in 1983.

| Week ending | Song | Artist | Ref. |
|---|---|---|---|
| 1 January | "Save Your Love" | Renée and Renato | |
| 8 January | "Save Your Love" | Renée and Renato | |
| 15 January | "Save Your Love" | Renée and Renato | |
| 22 January | "You Can't Hurry Love" | Phil Collins | |
| 29 January | "Down Under" | Men at Work | |
| 5 February | "Down Under" | Men at Work | |
| 12 February | "Down Under" | Men at Work | |
| 19 February | "Down Under" | Men at Work | |
| 26 February | "Too Shy" | Kajagoogoo | |
| 5 March | "Billie Jean" | Michael Jackson | |
| 12 March | "Billie Jean" | Michael Jackson | |
| 19 March | "Total Eclipse of the Heart" | Bonnie Tyler | |
| 26 March | "Total Eclipse of the Heart" | Bonnie Tyler | |
| 2 April | "Total Eclipse of the Heart" | Bonnie Tyler | |
| 9 April | "Let's Dance" | David Bowie | |
| 16 April | "Let's Dance" | David Bowie | |
| 23 April | "Words" | F. R. David | |
| 30 April | "Words" | F. R. David | |
| 7 May | "Words" | F. R. David | |
| 14 May | "True" | Spandau Ballet | |
| 21 May | "Words" | F. R. David | |
| 28 May | "Words" | F. R. David | |
| 4 June | "Every Breath You Take" | The Police | |
| 11 June | "Every Breath You Take" | The Police | |
| 18 June | "Every Breath You Take" | The Police | |
| 25 June | "Every Breath You Take" | The Police | |
| 2 July | "Baby Jane" | Rod Stewart | |
| 9 July | "Baby Jane" | Rod Stewart | |
| 16 July | "Moonlight Shadow" | Mike Oldfield | |
| 23 July | "Wherever I Lay My Hat (That's My Home)" | Paul Young | |
| 30 July | "Wrapped Around Your Finger" | The Police | |
| 6 August | "Wrapped Around Your Finger" | The Police | |
| 13 August | "Wrapped Around Your Finger" | The Police | |
| 20 August | "Give it Up" | KC and the Sunshine Band | |
| 27 August | "Give it Up" | KC and the Sunshine Band | |
| 3 September | "Wings of a Dove" | Madness | |
| 10 September | "Red Red Wine" | UB40 | |
| 17 September | "Red Red Wine" | UB40 | |
| 24 September | "Red Red Wine" | UB40 | |
| 1 October | "Karma Chameleon" | Culture Club | |
| 8 October | "Karma Chameleon" | Culture Club | |
| 15 October | "Karma Chameleon" | Culture Club | |
| 22 October | "Karma Chameleon" | Culture Club | |
| 29 October | "They Don't Know" | Tracey Ullman | |
| 5 November | "They Don't Know" | Tracey Ullman | |
| 12 November | "Uptown Girl" | Billy Joel | |
| 19 November | "Uptown Girl" | Billy Joel | |
| 26 November | "Uptown Girl" | Billy Joel | |
| 3 December | "Love of the Common People" | Paul Young | |
| 10 December | "Love of the Common People" | Paul Young | |
| 17 December | "Only You" | The Flying Pickets | |
| 24 December | "Only You" | The Flying Pickets | |
| 31 December | "Only You" | The Flying Pickets | |

- 22 Number Ones
- Most weeks at No. 1 (song): "Words" - F. R. David (5)
- Most weeks at No. 1 (artist): The Police (7)
- Most No. 1s: The Police, Paul Young (2 each)

== See also ==
- 1983 in music
- Irish Singles Chart
- List of artists who reached number one in Ireland
