= BRT Top 30 number-one hits of 1984 =

These hits topped the Ultratop 50 in the Flanders region of Belgium in 1984.

== Singles ==
Issue date	Song	Artist
7 January	"Happy Station"	Fun Fun
14 January	"You Are"	Dolly Parton
21 January	"Thriller"	Michael Jackson
28 January	"Thriller"	Michael Jackson
4 February	"Love of the Common People"	Paul Young
11 February	"Love of the Common People"	Paul Young
18 February	"Love of the Common People"	Paul Young
25 February	"Love of the Common People"	Paul Young
3 March	"Love of the Common People"	Paul Young
10 March	Radio Ga Ga"	Queen
17 March	Radio Ga Ga"	Queen
24 March	"When the Lady Smiles"	Golden Earring
31 March	"Somebody's Watching Me"	Rockwell
7 April	"Love Is a Battlefield"	Pat Benatar
14 April	"Love Is a Battlefield"	Pat Benatar
21 April	"Hello"	Lionel Richie
28 April	"Hello"	Lionel Richie
5 May	"Hello"	Lionel Richie
12 May	"Hello"	Lionel Richie
19 May	"Hello"	Lionel Richie
26 May	"To All the Girls I've Loved Before"	Willie Nelson & Julio Iglesias
2 June	"I Want to Break Free"	Queen
9 June	"I Want to Break Free"	Queen
16 June	"I Want to Break Free"	Queen
23 June	"The Reflex"	Duran Duran
30 June	"The Reflex"	Duran Duran
7 July	"The Reflex"	Duran Duran
14 July	"The Reflex"	Duran Duran
21 July	"Wake Me Up Before You Go-Go"	Wham!
28 July	"Wake Me Up Before You Go-Go"	Wham!
4 August	"Dancing with Tears in My Eyes"	Ultravox
11 August	"Wake Me Up Before You Go-Go"	Wham!
18 August	"Two Tribes"	Frankie Goes To Hollywood
25 August	"Two Tribes"	Frankie Goes To Hollywood
1 September	"Two Tribes"	Frankie Goes To Hollywood
8 September	"Smalltown Boy"	Bronski Beat
15 September	"Ghostbusters"	Ray Parker Jr.
22 September	"I Just Called To Say I Love You"	Stevie Wonder
29 September	"I Just Called To Say I Love You"	Stevie Wonder
6 October	"I Just Called To Say I Love You"	Stevie Wonder
13 October	"I Just Called To Say I Love You"	Stevie Wonder
20 October	"I Just Called To Say I Love You"	Stevie Wonder
27 October	"I Just Called To Say I Love You"	Stevie Wonder
3 November	"I Just Called To Say I Love You"	Stevie Wonder
10 November	"I Just Called To Say I Love You"	Stevie Wonder
17 November	"Purple Rain"	Prince
24 November	"Purple Rain"	Prince
1 December	"When the Rain Begins to Fall"	Jermaine Jackson & Pia Zadora
8 December	"When the Rain Begins to Fall"	Jermaine Jackson & Pia Zadora
15 December	"When the Rain Begins to Fall"	Jermaine Jackson & Pia Zadora
22 December	"When the Rain Begins to Fall"	Jermaine Jackson & Pia Zadora
29 December	"Do They Know It's Christmas?"	Band Aid

== 1984 Year-End Chart ==
=== Singles ===
Pos.	Artist	Title	Peak
1	Stevie Wonder	"I Just Called To Say I Love You"	1
2	Wham!	"Wake Me Up Before You Go-Go"	1
3	Duran Duran	"The Reflex"	1
4	Frankie Goes To Hollywood	"Two Tribes"	1
5	Prince	"Purple Rain"	1
6	George Michael	"Careless Whisper"	2
7	Pat Benatar	"Love Is A Battlefield"	1
8	Paul Young	"Loved Of The Common People"	1
9	Lionel Richie	"Hello"	1
10	Willie Nelson and Julio Iglesias	"To All The Girls I've Loved Before"	1

== See also ==
- 1984 in music
