= Everything Must Change =

Everything Must Change may refer to:

- Everything Must Change (Randy Crawford album), 1976
- Everything Must Change (Johnny Lytle album), 1978
- "Everything Must Change" (song), a 1984 song by Paul Young
- "Everything Must Change", a song on Body Heat (Quincy Jones album)
- Everything Must Change: The Definitive Collection, a 2003 album by Dick Morrissey
