= Everything Must Change (song) =

1984 single by Paul Young

Single by Paul Young

from the album The Secret of Association
- B-side: "Give Me My Freedom"
- Released: 26 November 1984; November 1985 (US & Canada)
- Genre: Soft rock
- Length: 5:30
- Label: CBS; Columbia (North America)
- Songwriters: Paul Young; Ian Kewley
- Producer: Laurie Latham

Paul Young singles chronology
"I'm Gonna Tear Your Playhouse Down" (1984)	"Everything Must Change" (1984)	"Everytime You Go Away" (1985)

"Everything Must Change" is a song by English singer Paul Young, released in November 1984 by CBS Records as the second single from his second album The Secret of Association. It was released in North America by Columbia Records in November 1985. The B-side was "Give Me My Freedom" also written by Young and Kewley. However, the single was also additionally released in the Netherlands and France in 1985 with the B-side a cover of Tom Waits' "Soldier's Things".

== Track listings ==
7" (CBS, A 4972, 1984)

1. "Everything Must Change" – 5:30
2. "Give Me My Freedom" – 3:25

7" (CBS A 6649, 1985, Netherlands & France)

1. "Everything Must Change" – 5:23
2. "Soldier's Things" – 6:21

7" promo (CBS, A 4972, 1984)

1. "Everything Must Change" – 5:30
2. "Everything Must Change" (Radio Edit) – 4:28

Double 7" (The Christmas Package) (CBS, DA 4972, 1984)

1. "Everything Must Change"
2. "Give Me My Freedom"
3. "Everything Must Change" (Instrumental Version)
4. Paul's Christmas Message
5. "I Close My Eyes and Count to Ten" (Recorded Live)

12" (CBS, TA 4972 / A 12.4972, 1984)

1. "Everything Must Change" (Extended Version) – 8:26
2. "Give Me My Freedom" – 3:25

12" (CBS, A 12.6649, 1985, Netherlands & France)

1. "Everything Must Change" (Extended Version) – 8:26
2. "Soldier's Things" – 6:21

12" maxi (CBS, HUL 40086, 1984, South Africa)

1. "Everything Must Change"
2. "Wherever I Lay My Hat"
3. "Love of the Common People"
4. "Love Will Tear Us Apart"

== Personnel ==
- Paul Young – lead vocals
- George Chandler, Jimmy Chambers and Tony Jackson – backing vocals
- Ian Kewley – keyboards
- John Turnbull – guitar
- Pino Palladino – bass guitar
- B. J. Cole – pedal steel guitar
- Mark Pinder – drums, percussion

== Charts ==
Chart (1984–1986)	Peak position
Australia (Kent Music Report)	27
Belgium (Ultratop 50 Flanders)	25
Canada Top Singles (RPM)	46
Europe (European Hot 100 Singles)	25
Finland (Suomen virallinen lista)	27
Germany (GfK)	28
Ireland (IRMA)	6
Israel (IBA)	8
Netherlands (Dutch Top 40)	25
Netherlands (Single Top 100)	23
New Zealand (Recorded Music NZ)	42
UK Singles (Official Charts)	9
US Billboard Hot 100	56
