= Other Voices (Paul Young album) =

Studio album by Paul Young
- Released: 4 June 1990
- Recorded: October 1988 – February 1990
- Genre: Pop rock
- Length: 45:56
- Label: Columbia
- Producer: Pete Wingfield; Warne Livesey; Martin Page; Nile Rodgers; Peter Wolf

Paul Young chronology
Between Two Fires (1986)	Other Voices (1990)	From Time to Time – The Singles Collection (1991)

Singles from Other Voices
- 1. "Softly Whispering I Love You" Released: 30 April 1990; 2. "Oh Girl" Released: 25 June 1990; 3. "Heaven Can Wait" Released: 1990; 4. "Calling You" Released: 24 December 1990

Professional ratings
Review scores
Source	Rating
AllMusic	3/5 stars
Select	1/5
Smash Hits	6/10

Other Voices is the fourth studio album by the English singer Paul Young. Released in June 1990, the album peaked at No. 4 on the UK Albums Chart and has been certified gold by the British Phonographic Industry for UK sales in excess of 100,000 copies.

The album contains four UK singles: "Softly Whispering I Love You" (UK #21), "Heaven Can Wait" (UK #71), "Calling You" (UK #57), and a cover of the Chi-Lites' hit "Oh Girl" (UK #25, U.S. #8).

The album followed the pattern of Young's first three albums combining cover versions with original songs. However, with the songwriting partnership of Young and keyboard player Ian Kewley breaking up, this album returned to the dominance of cover versions seen on Young's debut No Parlez. However, there were three original songs composed by Young with new keyboard player Martin Page.

== Track listing ==
Original 1990 release
No.	Title	Writer(s)	Length
1.	"Heaven Can Wait"	Paul Rutter	4:10
2.	"Right About Now"	Paul Young; Martin Page	5:10
3.	"Oh Girl"	Eugene Record	3:34
4.	"A Little Bit of Love"	Paul Rodgers; Andy Fraser; Paul Kossoff; Simon Kirke	3:50
5.	"Stop on By"	Bobby Womack; Terry Thomas	5:21
6.	"Our Time Has Come"	Paul Young; Martin Page	4:39
7.	"Softly Whispering I Love You"	Roger Cook; Roger Greenaway	4:13
8.	"Together"	Paul Young; Martin Page	4:33
9.	"It's What She Didn't Say"	Peter Wolf; Ina Wolf	5:03
10.	"Calling You"	Bob Telson	5:08
Total length:			45:41

Other Voices was re-released as a 2 x CD album in 2012 under licence on Cherry Pop and contained a second CD containing 12" remixes and b-sides.

Disc 1
No.	Title	Writer(s)	Length
1.	"Heaven Can Wait"	Paul Rutter	4:12
2.	"A Little Bit of Love"	Paul Rodgers; Andy Fraser; Paul Kossoff; Simon Kirke	3:52
3.	"Softly Whispering I Love You"	Roger Cook; Roger Greenaway	4:14
4.	"Together"	Paul Young; Martin Page	4:33
5.	"Stop on By"	Bobby Womack; Terry Thomas	5:23
6.	"Our Time Has Come"	Paul Young; Martin Page	4:39
7.	"Oh Girl"	Eugene Record	3:36
8.	"Right About Now"	Paul Young; Martin Page	5:11
9.	"It's What She Didn't Say"	Peter Wolf; Ina Wolf	5:04
10.	"Calling You"	Bob Telson	5:08
11.	"Dolcemente Mormoro Ti Amo (Softly Whispering I Love You)"	Roger Cook; Roger Greenaway	5:10
Total length:			51:02

Disc 2
No.	Title	Writer(s)	Length
1.	"Softly Whispering I Love You (Extended Version)"	Roger Cook; Roger Greenaway	6:06
2.	"Leaving Home"	Paul Young; Stacey Young	4:18
3.	"Lovers Cross"	Jim Croce	6:10
4.	"You're the One"	Paul Young; Pino Palladino	4:19
5.	"'Til I Gain Control Again"	Rodney Crowell	5:30
6.	"Trying to Guess the Rest"	Paul Young; Ian Kewley	3:48
7.	"Back Where I Started"	Paul Young; Martin Page	4:06
8.	"Heaven Can Wait (12" Remix)"	Paul Rutter	6:43
9.	"That's How It Is (Remix)"	Willie Hale	4:00
10.	"Everything Must Change (Live)"	Paul Young; Ian Kewley	5:37
Total length:			50:37

== Personnel ==
- Paul Young – vocals, acoustic guitar (3), backing vocals (6)
- Richard Cottle – keyboards (1, 5), Hammond organ (3)
- Paul Wickens – acoustic piano (1, 3, 4, 8), organ (1), Hammond organ (4)
- Richard Hilton – programming (2)
- Nile Rodgers – programming (2), guitars (2)
- Warne Livesey – synthesizers (3), synthesizer programming (3), acoustic guitar (3), keyboards (4, 8), programming (4), bass (8)
- Steve Winwood – Hammond organ (5)
- Martin Page – keyboards (6, 8), percussion (6), backing vocals (6), additional guitar (8), bass (8)
- Larry Williams – keyboards (6), programming (6), saxophone (6)
- Pete Wingfield – acoustic piano (7)
- Peter Wolf – keyboards (9, 10)
- Steve Bolton – guitars (1)
- David Gilmour – lead guitar (1), guitar solo (2)
- Robbie McIntosh – electric guitar (3), guitars (4)
- Dominic Miller – nylon guitar (3), guitars (8)
- Neil Hubbard – guitars (5)
- Dann Huff – guitars (6)
- Robert Ahwai – guitars (7)
- David Williams – guitars (9)
- Dori Caymmi – guitars (10), backing vocals (10)
- Pino Palladino – bass (1, 3–5, 9, 10)
- Julian Crampton – bass (7)
- Neil Conti – drums (1)
- Andres Levin – drum samples (2)
- Manu Katché – drums (3–5, 8)
- Vinnie Colaiuta – drums (6, 9, 10)
- Graham Ward – drums (7)
- Danny Cummings – percussion (4, 5)
- Anne Dudley – strings (3, 7)
- Guy Barker – flugelhorn (4)
- Stevie Wonder – harmonica solo (7, 10)
- Chaka Khan – harmony vocals (1, 5)
- Jimmy Chambers – backing vocals (1, 3, 4, 7)
- George Chandler – backing vocals (1, 3, 4, 7)
- Ava Cherry – backing vocals (1, 8)
- Belva Haney – backing vocals (1, 8)
- Jimmy Helms – backing vocals (1, 3, 4, 7)
- Beverley Skeete – backing vocals (1, 8)
- Michelle Cobbs – backing vocals (2)
- Lamya – backing vocals (2)
- Fonzi Thornton – backing vocals (2)
- Robert Carr – backing vocals (3)
- Paul Lee – backing vocals (3)
- Merlin Sutherland – backing vocals (3)
- Carol Thompson – backing vocals (3)
- Joan Todd – backing vocals (3)
- Liliana Chachian – Spanish chorus (4)
- Carlos Fuentes – Spanish chorus (4)
- Tommy Funderburk – backing vocals (6)
- Joe Pizzulo – backing vocals (6, 9)
- Phyllis St. James – backing vocals (6)
- Phillip Ingram – backing vocals (9)
- Darryl Phinnessee – backing vocals (9)
- Oren Waters – backing vocals (9)
- Ina Wolf – backing vocals (9)

== Production ==
- Paul Young – executive producer
- Wayne Livesey – producer (1, 3–5, 8)
- Nile Rodgers – producer (2)
- Martin Page – producer (6)
- Pete Wingfield – producer (7)
- Peter Wolf – producer (9, 10)
- Patrick Dillett – engineer
- Bino Espinoza – engineer, mixing (9)
- Ted Hayton – engineer
- Steve Jackson – engineer
- Joe Scott – recording
- Mark Chamberlain – overdub recording
- Mike Ross-Trevor – strings engineer (3, 7)
- Bob Clearmountain – mixing (1, 3, 7)
- Michael H. Brauer – mixing (2, 4, 5, 6, 8)
- Paul Erickson – mixing (10)
- Stylorouge – art direction, design
- Douglas Brothers – photography
- Ged Doherty – management

== Charts and certifications ==
=== Weekly charts ===
Chart (1990)	Peak position
Australia Albums Chart	102
Dutch Albums Chart	51
Swedish Albums Chart	40
UK Albums Chart	4
US Billboard 200	142

=== Certifications ===
Region	Certification	Certified units/sales
United Kingdom (BPI)	Gold	100,000^{^}
^{^} Shipments figures based on certification alone.
