= Nicky Thomas (singer) =

Jamaican musician

- Also known as: Mr Nigel
- Born: Cecil Thomas; 30 May 1944; Portland, Jamaica
- Died: 1990 (aged 45–46) London
- Genres: Reggae
- Instrument: Vocals
- Years active: 1969–late 1980s
- Labels: Trojan, Horse, JoGibb, Bullet

Cecil Thomas (30 May 1944 – 1990), known as Nicky Thomas, was a Jamaican-born reggae singer who enjoyed considerable chart success in Jamaica and in the United Kingdom at the start of the 1970s.

== Early life ==
Cecil Thomas was born and raised in Portland Parish, Jamaica. He began work as a labourer in Kingston where he worked alongside future members of The Gladiators. His opportunity to cut some records came when the former Jiving Junior and producer, Derrick Harriott wrote and produced "Run Mr Nigel Run" for Thomas. A huge Jamaican hit, the song led to him being known as Mr Nigel for a time. He was also successful with "Come Home" a song from the same session.

This was followed by a successful association with producer Joel Gibson better known as Joe Gibbs, for whom Thomas recorded the plaintive "Running Alone" and "Lonesome Road" issued in 1969 as by Cecil Thomas, as well as a version of "Let It Be" credited to Nicky Thomas. Thomas' collaboration with Gibbs resulted in a number of hits including "Don't Touch Me", "Mama's Song" and "God Bless The Children". Thomas and Gibbs also covered a number of well regarded R&B hits that included Tyrone Davis' "Turn Back the Hands of Time" and "(Baby) Can I Change Your Mind" and Tony Joe White's "Rainy Night in Georgia". He topped the Jamaican charts in 1970 with "Have a Little Faith", a record that reputedly sold 50,000 copies on its release in the UK. It failed to chart in the UK because the sales were largely through specialist music shops and not statistically counted by the official chart compilers.

== Career ==
In mid-1970, Nicky Thomas' interpretation of the Winstons' version of "Love of the Common People" resulted in a UK hit. The record reached number nine in the UK Singles Chart, leading in turn to a European tour and a relocation to the United Kingdom. The original Jamaican mix (without additional strings) issued on early copies as by Cecil Thomas sold 50,000 copies in Jamaica and 175,000 in the UK. The success of "Love of the Common People" ensured an album of the same name released on Trojan Records, that featured tracks previously cut with Joe Gibbs in Jamaica.

Thomas followed up with a successful interpretation of Chris Andrews' "Yesterday Man" from his self-produced album Tell It Like It Is, recorded in London in 1971. The title track of this album was also released as a single, with a stinging attack on the BBC on the flip-side. Thomas objected to the low profile the public broadcaster was giving to reggae and in an interview with Carl Gayle vented his frustration comparing the playing of reggae on radio as akin to the use of a whore.

By 1973, Thomas was being produced by Dandy Livingstone, releasing a third album called Images of You that included a version of his former Jamaican hit "Have a Little Faith" and a cover of Joe Simon's "Doing The Moonwalk". In 1973 he supported Desmond Dekker on a short London tour and, in 1974, backed by Misty in Roots he successfully toured the UK. In 1976 he released the poignant "London", a song about the desperation of an immigrant's life in London and featured in an ITV television documentary recording What Love Is at studios in north London.

By the early 1980s, he was recording in a roots reggae style. In 1980 he recorded "Trow Mi Corn-No Portion of Gal" for Joe Gibbs' US distributed JGM Records.

In 1983, the singer Paul Young took "Love of the Common People" back into the UK chart reviving interest in Thomas's version of the song that in turn resulted in Trojan reissuing it as a 12-inch single that included an extended remix version.

== Death ==
He died in about 1990. According to his record company, "the precise circumstances surrounding his death seem confused to this day – the most common account tells of the singer suffering a broken heart and subsequently taking his own life."

== Discography ==
=== Albums ===
- Love of the Common People (1970) Trojan
- Tell It Like It Is (1972) Trojan
- Images of You (1973) Horse
- Doing the Moon Walk (1997) Trojan (compilation)
- Love of the Common People (2003) Trojan (compilation)
