= John Hurley and Ronnie Wilkins =

American songwriting team

John Hurley
- Born: John David Hurley; April 18, 1941; Pittsburgh, Pennsylvania, U.S.
- Died: August 16, 1986 (aged 45); Nashville, Tennessee, U.S.
- Occupations: Musician, songwriter

Ronnie Wilkins
- Born: Ronald Stephen Wilkins; October 8, 1941 (age 85); Lumberton, North Carolina, U.S.
- Occupations: Musician, songwriter

John David Hurley (April 18, 1941 – August 16, 1986) and Ronald Stephen Wilkins (born October 8, 1941) were American musicians and songwriting partners responsible for writing the hit songs "Love of the Common People" and "Son of a Preacher Man". Hurley also recorded three albums in the 1970s.

== Origins and early careers ==
John Hurley was born in Pittsburgh, Pennsylvania. As a child, he performed in Pittsburgh barrooms with his uncle, and co-hosted a local radio show. He also sang with the Pittsburgh Opera Company before discovering rock and roll and moving to Nashville. He joined the Tree music publishing company as a songwriter in 1962. He served for a time with the U.S. Army.

Ronnie Wilkins was born in Lumberton, North Carolina. He started writing songs and performing while at high school, and as a teenager appeared on local radio station WAGR where he was heard by a Charlotte talent agent and as a result auditioned successfully for Tree. His first successful record as a songwriter was Joe Dowell's "Poor Little Cupid" in 1963.

== Songwriting partnership ==
By the mid-1960s, Hurley and Wilkins worked regularly together as a songwriting partnership at Tree, initially focusing on songs for soul musicians including Joe Tex. Their first chart hit was in 1965 with the Gentrys' "Spread It On Thick", written by Hurley and Wilkins with Bill Cates. In 1966, the pair had further success with "The Land of Milk and Honey" by The Vogues. They also wrote "Love of the Common People", first recorded by The Four Preps in an arrangement by Leon Russell, and released as a single by Capitol Records. In 1967 the song became a country music hit for Waylon Jennings, and it was later recorded by many musicians including John Denver, The Everly Brothers,Joe Dolan, The Winstons, Nicky Thomas, and Paul Young.

In 1967, while working at Muscle Shoals, Alabama, Hurley and Wilkins were asked by Jerry Wexler to write a song for Aretha Franklin. Remembering that Aretha's father was a preacher, as Wilkins' grandfather had been, they quickly came up with the song "Son of a Preacher Man". Wexler liked the song and recorded it with Aretha Franklin, but her version was not released and Wexler passed the song on to Dusty Springfield for her album Dusty in Memphis. Released as a single in 1968, Springfield's version reached number 9 on the UK singles chart and number 10 on the Billboard Hot 100. In 1993, the song was sampled by Cypress Hill in "Hits from the Bong" on their successful album Black Sunday.

Other singers who recorded songs by Hurley and Wilkins included Nina Simone, Wayne Newton, Tanya Tucker and David Cassidy.

== Later activities ==
Both Hurley and Wilkins relocated to California in 1970, to work on Hurley's first solo album for RCA Records, ...Sings About People. Hurley recorded two further albums for Bell Records, Delivers One More Hallelujah (1971) and Children's Dreams (1973), but they were not commercially successful. Hurley died in Nashville in 1986, aged 45, from liver failure and a brain hemorrhage.

Wilkins continued to write songs, including Terry Gregory's 1981 country hit "Just Like Me", co-written with Dene Anton. He worked as a session musician on keyboards with Jose Feliciano, Jerry Reed, Floyd Cramer and others. He also toured with Loggins and Messina and as a member of Roger Miller's band. He moved from Los Angeles in 2004 to live in Fillmore, California. Wilkins still lives in Southern California, and in 2021 he wrote some new songs with Michael Kosser, who after the session said that Wilkins still was a capable songwriter.
