= Toast (song) =

1978 single by Streetband

Single by Streetband

from the album London
- B-side: "Hold On"
- Released: October 1978
- Genre: Novelty
- Length: 4:29
- Label: Logo
- Songwriter(s): Bernard Kelly
- Producer(s): Chaz Jankel

Streetband singles chronology
"Hold On" (1978)	"Toast" (1978)	"One More Step" (1979)

Official audio
- "Toast" on YouTube

"Toast" is a song by Streetband, known for their lead singer Paul Young, released as a single from their debut album London in October 1978.

== Release ==
The song was originally released as the B-side to Streetband's first single "Hold On" in September 1978. However, "Toast" received heavy airplay from Kenny Everett on Capital Radio and this led to the sides being flipped and "Toast" being released as the A-side a month later. Helped by the airplay, the song became successful, peaking at number 18 on the UK Singles Chart in November. The release coincided with the 1978 bakers' strike (during the Winter of Discontent), which saw people queuing for bread, and this led to increased radio airplay of the song.

== Composition and lyrics ==
In a 1980 issue of Record Mirror, Young said that "on Sunday, people go out for a gig, but they don't really act like they should be there. And 'Toast' was just something we did to turn their heads from the bar". "We were in the studio getting a single together and, due to a complete cock up, we found ourselves with three hours free studio time." Chaz Jankel "suggested that we record 'Toast' for the B-side."

However, in 2011, Young said the lyrics “were made up on the night Chaz Jankel came to see us...and he was scheduled to produce us. Believe it or not, it all came about because we had a novice road crew and not one of them could change a guitar string. When the rhythm player bust a string, he went off to do it himself (at the John Bull pub in Chiswick) and the rest of the band started busking on 'Lover', the jazz standard that I’d heard by Tony Bennett. So I wouldn’t be standing there like a plonker, I started scatting over the rhythm and arrived at the word ‘toast’ at the end of the chord sequence. It made sense, so I repeated that at the end of every chord sequence." However, the lyrics are credited to Bernard Kelly, which Young explained, "we credited it to our manager as our publishing was frozen, and never saw a penny from it!”

== Afterwards ==
Streetband failed to have any more success and disbanded a year later in 1979. Several of the members, including Young, then formed Q-Tips.

In 1994, the single was re-released after it was used in an advert for Gale's Pure Honey and was credited as 'Streetband featuring Paul Young'.

== Charts ==
Chart (1978)	Peak position
UK Singles (OCC)	18
