= Reflections (Paul Young album) =

Studio album by Paul Young
- Released: 14 November 1994
- Studio: Tropicana Studios (London, UK)
- Genre: Blue-eyed soul
- Length: 56:06
- Label: Vision
- Producer: Ian Levine

Paul Young chronology
The Crossing (1993)	Reflections (1994)	Paul Young (1997)

Singles from Reflecfions
- 1. "That's How Heartaches Are Made" Released: 28 November 1994; 2. "Until You Come Back to Me" Released: 1994 (Japan); 3. "Grazing in the Grass" Released: 13 February 1995

Reflections is the sixth studio album by English singer Paul Young, released in 1994. The album is made up of 15 soul covers and is Young's first and only to be released on the UK budget label Vision. It was released one year after The Crossing, Young's final album with Columbia Records. It reached No. 64 in the UK Albums Chart. Three singles were released from the album, none of them charting in the UK top 100.

It was produced by Northern soul moderniser Ian Levine.

== Track listing ==
1. "Grazing in the Grass" (Stewart Levine) - 4:13
2. "Until You Come Back to Me" (Morris Broadnax, Clarence Paul, Stevie Wonder - 3:42
3. "That's How Heartaches Are Made" (Bob Halley, Ben Raleigh) - 3:40
4. "Love Won't Let Me Wait" (Vinnie Barrett, Bobby Eli) - 3:15
5. "Just a Little Misunderstanding" (Morris Broadnax, Clarence Paul, Stevie Wonder) - 4:00
6. "Hey Girl Don't Bother Me" (Ray Whitley) - 3:43
7. "Baby, Don't Change Your Mind" (Van McCoy) - 3:40
8. "Reflections" (Holland–Dozier–Holland) - 3:04
9. "Love Is Like an Itching in My Heart" (Holland–Dozier–Holland) - 4:01
10. "Ain't No Sunshine" (Bill Withers) - 2:35
11. "Your Precious Love" (Nickolas Ashford, Valerie Simpson) - 4:34
12. "More Love" (Smokey Robinson) - 3:52
13. "Take Me in Your Arms and Love Me" (Barrett Strong, Cornelius Grant, Rodger Penzabene) - 3:17
14. "Love Makes The World Go Around (Deon Jackson) - 3:58
15. "Reach Out I'll Be There" (Holland–Dozier–Holland) - 3:07

== Personnel ==
- Paul Young – vocals
- Nigel Stock – keyboards, arrangements
- Erwin Keiles – guitars
- Phil Da Costa – drum programming
- Tim Earns – drum programming
- Robin Sellars – drum programming
- Maurizio Ravalico – live percussion
- Chris "Snake" Davies – saxophones, flute
- Dennis Rollins – trombone
- John Thirkell – trumpet
- Ian Levine – arrangements
- Billy Griffin – backing vocals, BGV arrangements
- Mary Kiani – backing vocals
- John Reid – backing vocals
- Miriam Stockley – backing vocals

=== Production ===
- Ian Levine – producer
- Phil Da Costa – engineer
- Tim Earns – engineer
- Iain Simpson – assistant engineer
- Bill Smith Studio – design
- Douglas Brothers – photography
