= Q-Tips (band) =

British band

- Origin: England
- Genres: Blue-eyed soul, new wave
- Years active: 1979–1982, 1993
- Past members: Paul Young; Ian Kewley; Mick Pearl; John Gifford; Dave Lathwell; Baz Watts; Steve Farr; Oscar Stuart Blandamer; Tony Hughes

Q-Tips were a British blue-eyed soul and new wave rock band, first formed in 1979 from the remnants of the rock group Streetband.

== Streetband ==
Apart from the novelty song "Toast", a B-side made successful from heavy airplay by Capital Radio’s Kenny Everett, Streetband had failed to find any commercial success with their two albums London and Dilemma (both released in 1979). Drummer Chalky and guitarist Roger Kelly departed, leaving the remaining trio of Paul Young on vocals, Mick Pearl on bass guitar, and guitarist John Gifford.

== Career ==
The ex-Streetbanders added Dave Lathwell on guitar and Baz Watts on drums. In addition, a four-piece brass section was created by Steve Farr (baritone saxophone), Richard Blanchchard (tenor saxophone), Oscar Stuart Blandamer (alto saxophone) and Tony Hughes (trumpet), and all hailed from the North London and Hertfordshire area. Organist Ian Kewley lived in Essex. Q-Tips' name derived from a well-known brand of cotton swab.

Q-Tips' first rehearsals took place in November 1979. Their first concert was on 18 November 1979 at the Queens Arms Hotel in Harrow. This was followed by another at the Horn of Plenty in St Albans – a regular gig for Streetband during 1978 – and a total of 16 in their first month of existence. Some personnel changes occurred during the first six months, with Blanchard and Lathwell leaving the band.

By 1 April 1980, the band had recorded two tracks, "SYSLJFM (The Letter Song)", and "Having a Party", both recorded at the Livingstone Studios in Barnet. Constant touring and concert appearances had built a strong fan base by mid 1981, when the small amount of soul music covers were outnumbered by the band's own tracks. The professionalism of the band had attracted the attention of several record labels, with Mickie Most (RAK Records) confirming on BBC Radio 1's Round Table programme that Q-Tips "...are easily the best live band working at the moment". In August 1980, the British music magazine NME reported that Q-Tips had released their debut, self-titled album.

In time, John Gifford was replaced by Garth Watt-Roy (formerly of The Greatest Show on Earth, East of Eden and Marmalade, and brother of Blockheads bassist Norman Watt-Roy) on guitar, and Blandamer was replaced by Nick Payne. This line-up remained for the rest of the band's career. They appeared on BBC Television's In Concert, Rock Goes to College and The Old Grey Whistle Test in the latter part of 1981. Other television appearance included Saturday morning TV. Q-Tips opened for The J. Geils Band, The Knack, Thin Lizzy, Bob Marley and the Average White Band.

The band toured with After the Fire, and supported The Who on their 12-date UK tour in 1981. In 1981, Q-Tips played the Montreux Jazz Festival. With poor record sales after the release of two albums and seven singles, the Q-Tips broke up in early 1982 when Paul Young signed a solo recording contract with CBS Records, retaining Kewley as keyboardist and co-writer. In late 1982 and early 1983, Farr, Hughes, Blandamer and Watts toured with Adam Ant on the UK and US legs of his Friend or Foe tour, and Farr, Hughes and Watts remained for Ant's 1984 Strip tour.

Young briefly teamed up again with Q-Tips for a reunion tour in 1993.

== Discography ==
=== Streetband ===
==== Albums ====
Title	Album details
London	Released: 9 February 1979; Label: Logo; Formats: LP; First studio album
Dilemma	Released: November 1979; Label: Logo; Formats: LP; Second studio album
Streetband Featuring Paul Young	Released: April 1984; Label: Cambra; Formats: 2xLP; First compilation album
London Dilemma – A Compleat Collection	Released: July 1985; Label: Compleat; Formats: 2xLP, MC; US and Canada-only release; Second compilation album

==== Singles ====
Title	Year	Peak chart positions
Title	Year	UK
"Hold On"	1978	—
"Toast"	1978	18
"One More Step"	1979	—
"Love Sign"	1979	—
"One Good Reason"	1979	—
"Mirror Star"	1979	—
"Toast" (reissue)	1994	—
"—" denotes releases that did not chart.

=== Q-Tips ===
==== Albums ====
Title	Album details	Peak chart positions
Title	Album details	UK
Q-Tips	Released: 15 August 1980; Label: Chrysalis; Formats: LP, MC; Studio album	50
Live at Last	Released: June 1982; Label: Rewind; Formats: LP, MC; Live album recorded in 1981	—
BBC Radio 1 Live in Concert	Released: 27 January 1992; Label: Windsong International; Formats: CD; Live album recorded in 1980/1981 at the Paris Theatre	—
Paul Young & the Q-Tips	Released: 1992; Label: Tring; Formats: CD; Compilation album	—
"—" denotes releases that did not chart.

==== Singles ====
Title	Year
"S.Y.S.L.J.F.M. (The Letter Song)"	1980
"Tracks of My Tears"	1980
"Uncle Willy" (Netherlands-only release)	1980
"A Man Can't Lose (What He Don't Have)"/"She's Some Kind of Wonderful"	1980
"Stay the Way You Are"	1981
"Love Hurts"	1981
"You Are the Life Inside of Me"	1982
"Broken Man" (as Paul Young with the Q-Tips; Germany-only release)	1982
"Love Hurts" (as the Q-Tips featuring Paul Young)	1983
"I Wish It Would Rain" (as the Q-Tips featuring Paul Young)	1984
