= Now I Know What Made Otis Blue =

Single by Paul Young

from the album The Crossing
- Released: 13 September 1993
- Length: 3:57
- Label: Columbia; MCA (US)
- Songwriters: Mick Leeson; Peter Vale
- Producer: Peter Vale

Paul Young singles chronology
"What Becomes of the Brokenhearted" (1992)	"Now I Know What Made Otis Blue" (1993)	"Hope in a Hopeless World" (1993)

Music video
- "Now I Know What Made Otis Blue" on YouTube

"Now I Know What Made Otis Blue" is a song performed by English singer Paul Young, released in September 1993 by Columbia Records as the lead single from his fifth studio album, The Crossing (1993). It was written by Mick Leeson and Peter Vale, and produced by Vale. The music video for the song was directed by Michael Geoghegan.

== Reception and chart performance ==
Aaron Badgley of AllMusic mentioned the song in a review about the album The Crossing saying that "'Now I Know What Made Otis Blue' is worth the price of the CD alone".

Of three songs released as a single from The Crossing, it was the highest charted single peaking at No. 14 on the UK Singles Chart and spending 7 weeks on the chart. It also charted on the German GfK Entertainment charts (No. 51), Dutch Single Top 100 (No. 36), Official New Zealand Music Chart (No. 38), and French Singles Chart (No. 16).

== Music video ==
The accompanying music video for "Now I Know What Made Otis Blue" was directed by Irish filmmaker Michael Geoghegan. It was produced by Louise Knight for Why Not Films and released on 13 September 1993. In the video, drenched in orange and red light, Young performs to a cast of extras who represent his moody swings.

== Charts ==
=== Weekly charts ===
Chart (1993)	Peak position
Europe (Eurochart Hot 100)	43
Europe (European Hit Radio)	3
France (SNEP)	16
Germany (GfK)	51
Iceland (Íslenski Listinn Topp 40)	6
Netherlands (Single Top 100)	36
New Zealand (Recorded Music NZ)	38
UK Singles (OCC)	14
UK Airplay (Music Week)	12

=== Year-end charts ===
Chart (1993)	Position
Europe (European Hit Radio)	39
