= Paul Young (album) =

Studio album by Paul Young
- Released: May 1997
- Genre: Country
- Length: 58:20
- Label: East West
- Producer: Greg Penny; Paul Young

Paul Young chronology
Reflections (1994)	Paul Young (1997)	Rock Swings – On the Wild Side of Swing (2006)

Singles from Paul Young
- 1. "I Wish You Love" Released: April 1997; 2. "Ball and Chain" Released: July 1997

Paul Young is the seventh solo studio album by English singer Paul Young, released in May 1997 on East West Records. This was Young's last album made up of original material, until his 2023 album, Behind the Lens. It displays a stronger country influence than his previous albums and saw significantly more songwriting input from Young, with eight of the twelve tracks being co-written by him. The album and lead single "I Wish You Love" both charted inside the UK top 40.

== Critical reception ==
A review in The Guardian believed the album marked a significant departure from Young's previous albums. The instrumentation was found to sound more akin to a Garth Brooks album than the output Young was best known for. Despite saying it potentially had "all the ingredients for a first-class disaster" the review rated the album as "good" and awarded it a score of 3 out of 5.

== Track listing ==
No.	Title	Writer(s)	Length
1.	"Ball and Chain"	Paul Young; Drew Barfield	5:12
2.	"I Wish You Love"	Young; Barfield	4:52
3.	"Tularosa"	Young; Barfield	5:55
4.	"Vanish"	Young; Gary Burr; Simon Wilson	3:46
5.	"Hard Cargo"	Boo Hewerdine; Steve Booker	5:40
6.	"Say Goodbye"	Young; Barfield	4:10
7.	"In a Dream Gone By"	Young; Barfield; Jamie Moses	4:07
8.	"You'd Better Run Away"	Young; Barfield; The Keys	3:39
9.	"Across the Borderline"	John Hiatt; Ry Cooder; Jim Dickinson	5:39
10.	"Then There's You"	Young; Steve Seskin; Pat MacDonald	3:55
11.	"It Was a Very Good Year"	Ervin Drake	4:56
12.	"Window World"	Young; Barfield	6:29

Note

- Track 10 contains a loop of the song "Neanderthal Man" by Hotlegs.
- Track 11 contains a loop of the songs "Overcome" by Tricky, "Loser" by Beck, and "I Couldn't Keep It to Myself" by Tony! Toni! Toné!.

== Personnel ==
- Paul Young – lead vocals (all tracks), backing vocals (1–4, 6–10), acoustic guitar, sitar (8), tambourine (8)
- Simon Clark – keyboards (1, 3–12)
- Steve Piggott – keyboards (1, 3–12), synthesizers (3, 5, 6, 9, 12)
- Matt Irving – accordion (1, 3, 7, 9, 11)
- Ross Cullum – keyboards (2)
- Jack Hues – programming (2), guitars (2), bass (2)
- Robbie McIntosh – electric guitar, acoustic guitar
- Jamie Moses – electric guitar, acoustic guitar, backing vocals (1, 3, 5, 7, 9)
- Melvin Duffy – pedal steel guitar (4, 8)
- David Pilch – bass (1, 3–9, 12)
- Chris Hughes – bass and drum programming (2)
- Steve Greetham – bass (10, 11), backing vocals (4)
- Pino Palladino – bass (11)
- Curt Bisquera – drums, percussion
- Greg Penny – beat box (3), tambourine (6)
- Ben Georgiades – cymbals (5)
- Bob Loveday – violin (2)
- Skaila Kanga – Paraguayan harp (3, 7, 12)
- Brendan Power – harmonica (4)
- Frank Mead – saxophone (6)
- Nick Payn – saxophone (6)
- Nick Pentelow – saxophone (6)
- Courtney Pine – saxophone (12)
- Martin Drover – trumpet (6, 7)
- The London Session Orchestra – orchestra; led by Gavyn Wright (3, 4, 8, 11)
- Anne Dudley – string arrangements & conductor (3, 4, 8, 11)
- Drew Barfield – backing vocals (1–10)
- Steve Booker – backing vocals (5)
- Boo Hewerdine – backing vocals (5)
- Carol Kenyon – backing vocals (2)
- John Tonks – loops & fills

== Production ==
- Greg Penny – producer
- Paul Young – producer
- Chris Hughes – executive producer, mixing (2)
- Andy Strange – recording, mixing (7, 9, 12)
- Bob Clearmountain – mixing (1, 3–6, 8, 10, 11)
- Ross Cullum – mixing (2)
- Tony Cousins – mastering
- Martin Granville-Twig – mastering
- Norman Watson – photography

== Charts ==
Chart (1997)	Peak position
UK Albums Chart	39
German Albums Chart	90
