= The Crossing (Paul Young album) =

Studio album by Paul Young
- Released: 11 October 1993
- Genre: Rock; pop rock; blue-eyed soul
- Length: 49:44
- Label: Columbia
- Producer: Don Was; Peter Vale; Christopher Neil; Steve Lindsey

Paul Young chronology
From Time to Time – The Singles Collection (1991)	The Crossing (1993)	Reflections (1994)

Singles from The Crossing
- 1. "Now I Know What Made Otis Blue" Released: 13 September 1993; 2. "Hope in a Hopeless World" Released: 8 October 1993; 3. "It Will Be You" Released: 11 April 1994

The Crossing is the fifth studio album by English singer Paul Young. Released in 1993, the album peaked at No. 27 on the UK Albums Chart.

The album contains three UK singles: "Now I Know What Made Otis Blue" (UK No. 14), "Hope in a Hopeless World" (UK No. 42), and "It Will Be You" (UK No. 34). The album was dedicated to the memory of Jeff Porcaro, having appeared on 6 out of 11 pieces, who died in August 1992. Its liner notes by Paul Young describe the sessions for the album

== Critical reaction ==
Professional ratings
Review scores
Source	Rating
AllMusic	4/5 stars
Music Week	3/5 stars

Aaron Badgley of AllMusic writes that The Crossing is a "very consistent, smooth, well-produced album ... "Now I Know What Made Otis Blue" is worth the price of the CD alone, but the other songs are top-notch as well."

== Track listing ==
No.	Title	Writer(s)	Producer(s)	Length
1.	"Hope in a Hopeless World"	Bob Thiele; Phil Roy	Don Was	4:19
2.	"Now I Know What Made Otis Blue"	Mick Leeson; Peter Vale	Peter Vale	4:00
3.	"Bring Me Home"	George Merrill; Shannon Rubicam	Christopher Neil	4:03
4.	"The Heart Is a Lonely Hunter"	Paul Young; Doug James	Was	4:21
5.	"Won't Look Back"	Young; Drew Barfield	Was	5:23
6.	"Only Game in Town"	Young; Martin Page	Was	4:20
7.	"Love Has No Pride"	Eric Kaz; Libby Titus	Was	3:46
8.	"Down in Chinatown"	Young; Barfield; Don Was	Was	5:36
9.	"Half a Step Away"	Young; Barfield	Was	5:00
10.	"Follow On"	Paul Brady	Was	4:10
11.	"It Will Be You"	Thiele; Roy	Steve Lindsey	4:41

== Personnel ==
- Paul Young – lead vocals, backing vocals (6)
- Roy Hay – keyboards (1), guitar (1)
- Bob Thiele Jr. – keyboards (1), backing vocals (1)
- Billy Preston – Hammond B3 organ (1)
- Peter Vale – keyboards (2), programming (2), guitar (2), bass (2), backing vocals (2)
- Adrian Lee – keyboards (3), bass (3)
- Louis Biancaniello – keyboards (4, 8), Fairlight programming (4), synth bass (4), drum programming (4), sequencing (4), arrangements (4, 8), programming (8)
- Jamie Muhoberac – additional keyboards (4)
- Larry Knechtel – acoustic piano (5, 7, 9, 10)
- Benmont Tench – Hammond B3 organ (5, 7, 9, 10)
- Don Was – Mellotron (5), vibraphone (8)
- Martin Page – keyboards (6), acoustic piano (6), programming (6), backing vocals (6)
- Robbie Buchanan – keyboards (9, 10)
- Greg Phillinganes – acoustic piano (11)
- Jim Cox – organ (11)
- Paul Jackson Jr. – electric guitar (1, 4), guitars (11)
- Phil Roy – guitar (1), backing vocals (1)
- Neil Hubbard – rhythm guitar (2)
- Tim Renwick – guitars (3)
- Dean Parks – acoustic guitar (5, 7, 9, 10), slide guitar (7), guitar solo (7), electric guitar (8)
- Reggie Young – electric guitar (5, 7, 9, 10)
- Mark Goldenberg – guitars (6)
- Davey Faragher – bass (1)
- James "Hutch" Hutchinson – bass (5, 9)
- Pino Palladino – bass (6, 7, 10)
- Ken Wild – bass (10)
- Freddie Washington – bass (11)
- Jeff Porcaro – drums (1, 5, 6, 7, 9, 10)
- Peter Van Hooke – drums (3)
- Ed Greene – drums (11)
- Lenny Castro – percussion (1, 5–10)
- Luis Conte – tambourine (1), congas (4), shaker (4), timbales (4)
- Alan Estes – vibraphone (11)
- Mark Feltham – harmonica (2)
- Tommy Morgan – bass harmonica (10)
- Kirk Whalum – saxophone (4, 5)
- Jon Clarke – woodwind (5, 7, 10)
- Andrew Love – saxophone (7)
- Steve Kujala – flute (9)
- Gary Herbig – saxophone solo (11)
- Wayne Jackson – trombone (7), trumpet (7)
- Mark Isham – trumpet (8)
- David Campbell – string arrangements (5, 7, 10, 11), conductor (11)
- Larry Corbett – cello (5, 7, 10)
- Suzie Katayama – cello (5, 7, 10)
- Novi Novog – viola (5, 7, 10)
- Charlie Bisharat – violin (5, 7, 10)
- Ron Clark – violin (5, 7, 10)
- Lee Thornberg – horn arrangements (11)
- Angel Rogers – backing vocals (1)
- Billy Valentine – backing vocals (1)
- Sylvia Mason-James – backing vocals (2)
- Beverley Skeete – backing vocals (2)
- Pam Sheyne – backing vocals (3)
- Linda Taylor – backing vocals (3)
- Willie Greene Jr. – backing vocals (5, 7, 9, 10)
- Arno Lucas – backing vocals (5, 9)
- Leslie Smith – backing vocals (5, 9)
- Everette Drake – backing vocals (7, 10)
- Wayne Murry – backing vocals (7, 10)
- Francine Reed – backing vocals (7, 10)
- Delta Dickerson – backing vocals (8)
- Portia Griffin – backing vocals (8)
- Anita Sherman – backing vocals (8)
- Myrna Smith – backing vocals (8)
- Jessica Williams – backing vocals (8)
- Kathleen Turner – special guest vocal appearance (8)
- Patty Smith – backing vocals (10)
- Kevin Dorsey – backing vocals (11)
- Jim Gilstrap – backing vocals (11)
- Dorian Holley – backing vocals (11)
- Darryl Phinnessee – backing vocals (11)

== Production ==
- Paul Young – executive producer
- Don Was – producer (1, 4–10)
- Peter Vale – producer (2)
- Christopher Neil – producer (3), mixing (3)
- Steve Lindsey – producer (11)
- Rik Pekkonen – recording (1, 4–10), mixing (9, 10)
- Richard Whaley – engineer (2)
- Simon Hurrell – engineer (3)
- Gabe Veltri – engineer (11), recording (11)
- Bob Clearmountain – mixing (1)
- Laurie Latham – mixing (2), additional vocal mixing (4), additional recording production (5)
- Ken Kessie – mixing (4, 8)
- George Massenburg – mixing (5)
- Chris Lord-Alge – mixing (6)
- Ed Cherney – mixing (7)
- Bill Schnee – mixing (11)
- Dan Bosworth – recording assistant (1, 4–10), mix assistant (4, 9, 10)
- Alex Reed – mix assistant (1)
- Randy Wine – mix assistant (1)
- Paul Mortimer – assistant engineer (3)
- Marnie Riley – mix assistant (5, 7)
- Talley Sherwood – mix assistant (6)
- Danny Alonso – mix assistant (8)
- Noel Hazen – recording assistant (11)
- Vince Frost – art direction, design
- Douglas Brothers – photography

== Charts ==
Chart performance for The Crossing
Chart (1993)	Peak position
Dutch Albums (Album Top 100)	65
German Albums (Offizielle Top 100)	82
UK Albums (OCC)	27
