= Everytime You Go Away =

1980 song by Hall & Oates

Song by Hall & Oates

from the album Voices
- Released: July 29, 1980
- Genre: Blue-eyed soul; gospel
- Length: 5:23
- Label: RCA
- Songwriter: Daryl Hall
- Producers: Daryl Hall; John Oates

"Everytime You Go Away" is a song written by American musician Daryl Hall. It was first recorded in 1980 by his duo Hall & Oates but was not released as a single. A cover version of the song by Paul Young became an international hit in 1985, reaching No. 1 in the US and No. 4 in the UK.

== Hall & Oates version ==
The original version of "Everytime You Go Away" appeared on Hall & Oates's 1980 studio album, Voices, although it was not released as a single. Hall & Oates also recorded it for their 1985 concert album Live at the Apollo.

As Tom Breihan wrote in Stereogum, "It’s not a particularly complicated song, but it does a nice job showing off Hall’s soul-singer chops. Hall and Oates recorded the track as a warm, spacious, gospel-informed lament. The arrangement is built around a churchy organ and an old-timey guitar figure, and it gives Hall’s voice plenty of room to operate." Hall commented, "It's just one of those songs. I feel very proud of its craftsmanship."

=== Personnel ===
- Daryl Hall – lead vocals, backing vocals, synthesizers
- John Oates – backing vocals, 6-string and 12-string guitars
- Ralph Schuckett – organ
- G.E. Smith – guitars
- John Siegler – bass
- Jerry Marotta – drums
- Charlie DeChant – saxophone

== Paul Young version ==
"Every Time You Go Away"

Single by Paul Young

from the album The Secret of Association
- B-side: "This Means Anything"
- Released: February 25, 1985
- Recorded: 1984
- Length: 5:23 (album version); 4:15 (7" version); 7:32 (12" version); 4:27 (radio edit)
- Label: Columbia
- Songwriter: Daryl Hall
- Producer: Laurie Latham

Paul Young singles chronology
"Love of the Common People" (1984)	"Every Time You Go Away" (1985)	"I'm Gonna Tear Your Playhouse Down" (1985)

=== Background ===
English singer Paul Young recorded a cover version of the song titled "Every Time You Go Away" for his studio album The Secret of Association in 1985. His cover features a combination of echoed piano, the Yamaha DX7's "harp" preset, the distinctive fretless bass of Pino Palladino, as well as a Coral electric sitar and an Ovation Spanish acoustic guitar, which were both played by John Turnbull.

In March 1985, Young's version hit No. 4 in the UK singles chart. It was among the songs he performed at Live Aid held at Wembley Stadium in London on July 13, 1985. It reached No. 1 on the Billboard Hot 100 two weeks later, and was one of two top 10 hits Young had on the U.S. pop singles chart (the second being his 1990 cover of "Oh Girl" by the Chi-Lites). "Every Time You Go Away" also topped the U.S. adult contemporary chart for two weeks. The song won British Video of the Year at the 1986 Brit Awards.

=== Reception ===
John Leland of Spin wrote, "What can you say bad about Paul Young, except perhaps that he generally doles out incredibly bland versions of even blander songs? Here, dispensing with his penchant for ersatz British soul, caresses it into warmly moving fuck music."

Daryl Hall said that the Young version was one of his favorite covers. "I never thought of it any other way than the way it was 'til Paul Young did it ... I was just doin' a kind of gospel/soul song; that was all I had in mind for it. I was really surprised to hear the production they did because it kept the elements but commercialized it - made it sound like a pop record."

=== Personnel ===
- Paul Young – lead vocals, backing vocals
- Ian Kewley – acoustic piano, synthesizers
- John Turnbull – electric sitar, classical guitar
- Steve Bolton – electric guitar
- Pino Palladino – fretless bass
- Mark Pinder – drums
- Marc Chantereau – tambourine
- Jimmy Chambers – backing vocals
- George Chandler – backing vocals
- Tony Jackson – backing vocals

=== Track listings ===
7" single

1. "Every Time You Go Away" – 4:15
2. "This Means Anything" – 3:13

12" maxi

1. "Every Time You Go Away" (Extended version) – 7:32
2. "This Means Anything" – 3:13

15" album

1. "Every Time You Go Away" – 4:28

=== Charts ===
==== Weekly charts ====
Chart (1985)	Peak position
Australia (Kent Music Report)	20
Belgium (Ultratop 50 Flanders)	18
Canada RPM Top Singles	1
Canada RPM Adult Contemporary	1
Netherlands (Single Top 100)	16
Finland (Suomen virallinen lista)	19
France (SNEP)	16
Ireland (IRMA)	2
New Zealand (Recorded Music NZ)	14
Norway (VG-lista)	2
UK Singles (OCC)	4
US Billboard Hot 100	1
US Billboard Adult Contemporary	1
US Billboard Mainstream Rock	14
US Cash Box Top 100	1
West Germany (GfK)	40

==== Year-end charts ====
Chart (1985)	Rank
Australia (ARIA)	108
Canada	20
UK Singles (OCC)	60
US Billboard Hot 100	11
US Cash Box Top 100	18

==== All-time charts ====
Chart (1958–2018)	Position
US Billboard Hot 100	462

=== Certifications ===
Country	Certification	Sales certified
Canada	Gold	50,000
UK	Silver	250,000
US	Gold	500,000

Region	Certification	Certified units/sales
New Zealand (RMNZ)	Gold	15,000^{‡}
^{‡} Sales+streaming figures based on certification alone.

== Kulcha version ==
"Everytime You Go Away"

Single by Kulcha
- B-side: "My Love"
- Released: June 12, 1995
- Length: 4:02
- Label: EastWest
- Songwriter: Daryl Hall
- Producer: Matthew O'Connor

Kulcha singles chronology
"Soul Feeling" (1995)	"Everytime You Go Away" (1995)	"Do You Like It?" (1996)

In June 1995, Australian R&B group Kulcha released a version of the song that peaked at 35 in Australia and 22 in New Zealand.

=== Track listing ===
1. "Everytime You Go Away" – 4:02
2. "Everytime You Go Away" (instrumental) – 3:58
3. "My Love" – 3:36

=== Charts ===
Chart (1995)	Peak position
Australia (ARIA)	35
New Zealand (Recorded Music NZ)	22

== Other cover versions ==
- Gloria Gaynor on her 1986 album The Power of Gloria Gaynor
- Blue Room on the soundtrack to the 1987 film Planes, Trains and Automobiles.
- George Benson and Al Jarreau on their 2006 album Givin' It Up.
- Susan Wong on her 2009 album 511.
- Barbara Jones on her 2010 album Blue Side Of Lonesome
- Lennon Stella and Kevin Garrett on a 2020 single.
- Academy Award nominee Cynthia Erivo as a 2025 single for the documentary John Candy: I Like Me.

== See also ==
- List of Hot 100 number-one singles of 1985 (U.S.)
- List of number-one adult contemporary singles of 1985 (U.S.)
