= Come Back and Stay =

Single by Paul Young

from the album No Parlez
- B-side: "Yours"
- Released: 2 September 1983
- Genre: New wave; blue-eyed soul
- Length: 4:57 (album version); 3:30 (single version); 7:26 (extended club version); 7:56 (scratch mix)
- Label: CBS (United Kingdom); Columbia (United States)
- Songwriter: Jack Lee
- Producer: Laurie Latham

Paul Young singles chronology
"Wherever I Lay My Hat (That's My Home)" (1983)	"Come Back and Stay" (1983)	"Love of the Common People" (1983)

"Come Back and Stay" is a 1981 song written and originally recorded by the American musician Jack Lee. In 1983, the English singer Paul Young, with female backing singers The Fabulous Wealthy Tarts (Marilyn "Maz" Roberts and Kim Lesley), released his version as a single from his album No Parlez, and it became an international hit, reaching number one in Belgium, New Zealand, Switzerland and West Germany, and the top three in several other countries. The song reached number four on the UK singles chart.

== Chart performance ==
=== Weekly charts ===
Weekly chart performance for "Come Back and Stay"
Chart (1983–1984)	Peak position
Australia (Kent Music Report)	18
Austria (Ö3 Austria Top 40)	3
Belgium (Ultratop 50 Flanders)	1
Canada Adult Contemporary (RPM)	22
Canada Top Singles (RPM)	42
France (IFOP)	5
Ireland (IRMA)	3
Netherlands (Dutch Top 40)	2
Netherlands (Single Top 100)	2
New Zealand (Recorded Music NZ)	1
Norway (VG-lista)	3
Sweden (Sverigetopplistan)	16
Switzerland (Schweizer Hitparade)	1
UK Singles (Official Charts)	4
US Billboard Hot 100	22
US Cash Box	29
West Germany (GfK)	1

=== Year-end charts ===
1983 year-end chart performance for "Come Back and Stay"
Chart (1983)	Rank
Belgium (Ultratop 50 Flanders)	30
Germany (Official German Charts)	48
Netherlands (Dutch Top 40)	21
Netherlands (Single Top 100)	28
West Germany (Official German Charts)	48

1984 year-end chart performance for "Come Back and Stay"
Chart (1984)	Rank
Austria (Ö3 Austria Top 40)	24
France (IFOP)	21
New Zealand (Recorded Music NZ)	50

=== Certifications and sales ===
Certifications and sales for "Come Back and Stay"
Region	Certification	Certified units/sales
France (SNEP)	Gold	500,000^{*}
Germany (BVMI)	Gold	500,000^{^}
United Kingdom (BPI)	Silver	250,000^{^}
^{*} Sales figures based on certification alone.^{^} Shipments figures based on certification alone.

== Cover versions ==
- James Morrison recorded a version of the song for the Radio 1 Established 1967 CD.
- The song was re-worked by Chicane and released as a dance track entitled "Come Back" in 2010 and was featured on the album Giants.

== See also ==
- List of number-one hits (Belgium)
- List of number-one hits of 1983 (Germany)
- List of number-one singles from the 1980s (New Zealand)
- List of number-one singles of the 1980s (Switzerland)
