= The Secret of Association =

Studio album by Paul Young
- Released: 25 March 1985
- Recorded: 1984–1985
- Genres: Pop rock; blue-eyed soul
- Length: 52:29 (LP)
- Label: Columbia
- Producer: Laurie Latham

Paul Young chronology
No Parlez (1983)	The Secret of Association (1985)	Between Two Fires (1986)

Singles from The Secret of Association
- 1. "I'm Gonna Tear Your Playhouse Down" Released: 1 October 1984; 2. "Everything Must Change" Released: 26 November 1984; 3. "Everytime You Go Away" Released: 25 February 1985; 4. "Tomb of Memories" Released: 10 June 1985

The Secret of Association is the second studio album by the English singer Paul Young. Released in 1985, it reached number one on the UK album charts and the Top 20 in the US. The album spawned hits including a cover of Hall & Oates' 1980 song "Everytime You Go Away", "I'm Gonna Tear Your Playhouse Down", "Everything Must Change" and "Tomb of Memories".

The album has been certified Double Platinum (600,000 copies sold) by the BPI in the UK and Gold (500,000 copies sold) in the US by the RIAA.

The album followed the pattern of Young's debut album, No Parlez, combining cover versions with original songs written by Young and keyboard player Ian Kewley. However, on this album the Young/Kewley partnership was better represented with five of their compositions featuring.

== Critical reception ==
Professional ratings
Review scores
Source	Rating
AllMusic	4/5 stars
Classic Pop	4/5 stars
The Rolling Stone Album Guide	3/5 stars
Sounds	4.5/5 stars
The Village Voice	B+

In his review of the album for Sounds, Garry Bushell found Young's voice "as expressive as ever" and Laurie Latham's production "less cluttered and obtrusive" than on No Parlez, concluding that "the overall feel is one of growing confidence and maturity", and that "The Secret of Association earmarks Young as a talent of lasting value".

Retrospectively, AllMusic critic Jose F. Promis called The Secret of Association a "stellar" record "featuring lush orchestration and Young's signature, soulful vocals," and "one of the better albums of the 1980s."

== Track listing ==
All tracks composed by Paul Young and Ian Kewley. Except where indicated.

1. "Bite the Hand That Feeds" (Billy Livsey, Graham Lyle) - 4:31
2. "Everytime You Go Away" (Daryl Hall) - 5:23
3. "I'm Gonna Tear Your Playhouse Down" (Earl Randle) - 5:05
4. "Standing on the Edge" (Andrew Barfield) - 4:38
5. "Soldier's Things" (Tom Waits) - 6:21
6. "Everything Must Change" - 5:35
7. "Tomb of Memories" - 3:53
8. "One Step Forward" - 3:42
9. "Hot Fun" - 4:26
10. "This Means Anything" - 3:13
11. "I Was in Chains" (Gavin Sutherland) - 5:42
12. "Man in the Iron Mask" (Billy Bragg) - 3:13 (Not included on vinyl record or U.S. releases.)

Note: some cassette releases feature "Man In The Iron Mask" as track 6 and replace tracks 2, 3, 6, 9 and 11 with extended remix versions.

The Secret Of Association was re-released as a 2 x CD album in 2007 under license on Edsel (EDSD2006) and contained a second CD containing 12" remixes and live tracks. "The Man In The Iron Mask" was excluded from the first CD but was instead featured on the second CD.

CD2 Listing

1. "I'm Gonna Tear Your Playhouse Down (special extended mix)"
2. "Everything Must Change (12" mix)"
3. "Give Me My Freedom"
4. "Everytime You Go Away (12" mix)"
5. "Tomb Of Memories (12" mix)"
6. "Man in the Iron Mask"
7. "Bite the Hand That Feeds (live at Hammersmith Odeon)"
8. "No Parlez (live at Hammersmith Odeon)"

== Personnel ==
- Paul Young – lead vocals, backing vocals, arrangements
- Ian Kewley – acoustic piano, Hammond organ, Yamaha DX7, Oberheim OB-Xa, Fairlight CMI, E-mu Emulator, arrangements
- Steve Bolton – guitars
- John Turnbull – guitars, electric sitar (2)
- B. J. Cole – pedal steel guitar
- Matt Irving – keyboard bass
- Pino Palladino – bass guitar, Chapman stick
- Mark Pinder – drums, Simmons drums, LinnDrum, Roland TR-808, percussion
- Marc Chantereau – percussion
- Laurie Latham – effects, arrangements
- Nick Payn – saxophone (7)
- Paul Nieman – trombone (5)
- Jim Paterson – trombone (9)
- Mark Feltham – bass harmonica (11)
- Graham Preskett – violin (11)
- Jimmy Chambers – backing vocals
- George Chandler – backing vocals
- Ged Doherty – backing vocals
- Tony Jackson – backing vocals
- Kim Lesley – backing vocals
- Maz Roberts – backing vocals
- Chris Difford – backing vocals (7)
- Glenn Tilbrook – backing vocals (7)

== Production ==
- Producer and Engineer – Laurie Latham
- Additional Engineers – Stewart Barry and James Illes
- Mastered by Tim Young
- Art Direction and Design – Rob O'Conner
- Cover Photography – Simon Fowler
- Inner Sleeve Photos – "Everyone"

== Charts ==
=== Weekly charts ===
Chart performance for The Secret of Association
Chart (1985–1986)	Peak position
Australian Albums (Kent Music Report)	6
Austrian Albums (Ö3 Austria)	20
Canadian Albums (The Record)	4
Dutch Albums (Album Top 100)	1
European Albums (IFPI)	2
Finnish Albums (Suomen virallinen lista)	9
French Albums (IFOP)	7
German Albums (Offizielle Top 100)	6
Italian Albums (AFI)	5
Japanese Albums (Oricon)	8
New Zealand Albums (RMNZ)	3
Norwegian Albums (VG-lista)	2
Spanish Albums (AFYVE)	5
Swedish Albums (Sverigetopplistan)	1
Swiss Albums (Schweizer Hitparade)	4
UK Albums (Official Charts)	1
US Billboard 200	19

=== Year-end charts ===
Year-end chart performance for The Secret of Association
Chart (1985)	Position
Austrian Albums (Ö3 Austria)	107
Dutch Albums (Album Top 100)	27
French Albums (IFOP)	20
German Albums (Offizielle Top 100)	54
Japanese Albums (Oricon)	84
New Zealand Albums (RMNZ)	18
Norwegian Albums (VG-lista)	11
Spanish Albums (AFYVE)	32
Swiss Albums (Schweizer Hitparade)	47
UK Albums (OCC)	10
US Billboard 200	66
US AOR (Radio & Records)	85

== Certifications ==
Certifications and sales for The Secret of Association
Region	Certification	Certified units/sales
Australia (ARIA)	Platinum	70,000^{^}
Canada (Music Canada)	2× Platinum	200,000^{^}
Finland (Musiikkituottajat)	Gold	30,254
France (SNEP)	Gold	100,000^{*}
Japan (RIAJ)	Platinum	200,000^{^}
New Zealand (RMNZ)	Platinum	15,000^{^}
Spain (Promusicae)	Platinum	100,000^{^}
United Kingdom (BPI)	2× Platinum	600,000^{^}
United States (RIAA)	Gold	500,000^{^}
^{*} Sales figures based on certification alone.^{^} Shipments figures based on certification alone.
