= Between Two Fires (album) =

Studio album by Paul Young
- Released: 20 October 1986
- Recorded: 1986
- Studio: Lark Recording Studios (Carimate, Italy); Logic Studios (Milan, Italy)
- Genre: Pop rock, soul
- Length: 44:45
- Label: Columbia/CBS Records
- Producer: Hugh Padgham Paul Young Ian Kewley

Paul Young chronology
The Secret of Association (1985)	Between Two Fires (1986)	Other Voices (1990)

Singles from Between Two Fires
- 1. "Wonderland" Released: 22 September 1986; 2. "Some People" Released: November 1986; 3. "Why Does a Man Have to Be Strong" Released: 26 January 1987; 4. "In the Long Run" Released: 1987 (Netherlands); 5. "War Games" Released: 1987 (Canada)

Professional ratings
Review scores
Source	Rating
Rolling Stone	(3.5/5)

Between Two Fires is the third solo album by English singer Paul Young. Released in October 1986, it reached No. 4 on the UK Albums Chart, and No. 77 on the US Billboard 200 album chart. The album has been certified Platinum (300,000 copies) by the British Phonographic Industry.

Between Two Fires follows the pattern of Young's first two albums combining cover versions with original songs written by Young and keyboard player Ian Kewley. However, after the numerous covers contained in the previous two works there were only two on this album with the Young/Kewley partnership contributing eight of the tracks, two co-written with bass player Pino Palladino.

Three singles were taken from the album; "Wonderland", "Some People", and "Why Does a Man Have to Be Strong", though none of these made the UK Top 20 unlike Young's previous singles. "Wonderland", written by Betsy Cook who also provided backing vocals on the album, reached No. 24 in the UK (Cook would later release her own version of the song on her 1992 album The Girl Who Ate Herself). "Some People" reached No. 56 in the UK and No. 65 in the US, while "Why Does a Man have to Be Strong" reached No. 63 in the UK.

== Critical reception ==
In a review for Rolling Stone, Laura Fissinger wrote: "Through the first few listens, the album seems muted and reticent, a bashful mishmash of pop riffs and references. But after those initial plays, Between Two Fires takes on remarkable colours, as if its ten tracks were strips of film coming to life in a photographer's darkroom. The record finally reveals itself to be a detailed portrait of the problems human beings have with sharing things – whether it's a whole planet or just a queen-size bed."

== Track listing ==
All tracks composed by Paul Young and Ian Kewley; except where indicated.

1. "Some People" - 4:42
2. "Wonderland" (Betsy Cook) - 4:56
3. "War Games" (Andrew Barfield) - 4:16
4. "In the Long Run" (Young, Kewley, Pino Palladino) - 4:14
5. "Wasting My Time" - 5:11
6. "Prisoner of Conscience" (Young, Kewley, Palladino) - 4:18
7. "Why Does a Man Have to Be Strong?" - 4:19
8. "A Certain Passion" - 4:12
9. "Between Two Fires" - 3:48
10. "Wedding Day" - 4:49
11. "Steps to Go" - 5:12

Note

- Track 11 included on some CD releases.

Between Two Fires was re-released as a 2 x CD album in 2007 under licence on Edsel and contained a second CD containing 12" remixes and b-sides. "Steps to Go" was excluded from the first CD but was instead featured on the second CD.

CD2 Listing

1. "Steps to Go"
2. "Wonderland (12" Milan Mix)"
3. "Some People (12" Mix)"
4. "A Matter of Fact"
5. "Some People (New York Mix)"
6. "Why Does a Man Have to Be Strong? (Extended Mix)"
7. "Trying to Guess the Rest"

== Personnel ==
- Paul Young – lead vocals, arrangements
- Matt Irving – keyboards
- Ian Kewley – keyboards, Hammond organ, arrangements
- Steve Boltz – guitars, sitar
- Pino Palladino – bass, arrangements
- David Palmer – drums, drum programming
- Danny Cummings – percussion
- Tony Jackson – backing vocals
- Hamish Stuart – backing vocals
- Betsy Cook – backing vocals

== Production ==
- Ian Kewley – producer
- Paul Young – producer
- Hugh Padgham – producer, engineer
- Pino Palladino – production assistance
- Paul "Croydon" Cook – assistant engineer
- Bob Ludwig – mastering at Masterdisk (New York City, New York)
- Rob O'Connor – art direction, design
- Stylorouge – art direction, design
- John Swannell – sleeve photography
- Ged Doherty – management
- Renegade Artists Management Ltd. – management company

== Charts ==
Chart (1986)	Peak position
Australian Albums (Kent Music Report)	40
Dutch Albums (Album Top 100)	23
German Albums (Offizielle Top 100)	63
New Zealand Albums (RMNZ)	39
Swedish Albums (Sverigetopplistan)	19
Swiss Albums (Schweizer Hitparade)	27
UK Albums (OCC)	4
US Billboard 200	77

== Certifications ==
Region	Certification	Certified units/sales
Canada (Music Canada)	Gold	50,000^{^}
United Kingdom (BPI)	Platinum	300,000^{^}
^{^} Shipments figures based on certification alone.
