= No Parlez =

- Vinyl edition

Studio album by Paul Young
- Released: 22 July 1983
- Recorded: 1982–1983
- Studios: The Workhouse, London
- Genres: Blue-eyed soul; pop; new wave
- Length: 51:04 (LP) 64:32 (CD)
- Label: CBS
- Producer: Laurie Latham

Paul Young chronology
No Parlez (1983)	The Secret of Association (1985)

Paul Young chronology
The Essential Paul Young (2003)	No Parlez (25th anniversary edition) (2008)

Singles from No Parlez
- 1. "Iron Out the Rough Spots" Released: 8 October 1982; 2. "Love of the Common People" Released: 7 January 1983; 3. "Wherever I Lay My Hat (That's My Home)" Released: 27 May 1983; 4. "Come Back and Stay" Released: 2 September 1983; 5. "Love Will Tear Us Apart" Released: February 1984

No Parlez is the debut solo studio album by English singer Paul Young. Released in 1983, it reached number one on the UK Albums Chart (for a non-consecutive total of 5 weeks) and remained in the UK Top 100 for 119 weeks. The album has been certified quadruple platinum by the BPI for UK sales in excess of 1.2 million copies.

== Release ==
Initially, the first two singles, "Iron Out the Rough Spots" and a remake of "Love of the Common People", had no success, but the third, a cover of the Marvin Gaye song "Wherever I Lay My Hat (That's My Home)", was No. 1 on the UK Singles Chart for three weeks in July and August 1983, and the first of Young's 14 UK Top 40 singles. Similar success followed in continental Europe. In the UK, the follow-up single "Come Back and Stay" reached No. 4, and the re-release of "Love of the Common People" made it to No. 2 in late 1983.

The album was released the year after the introduction of CDs with their potential for a longer playing time. The CD edition of No Parlez featured one extra track ("Behind Your Smile") not on the vinyl release. Additionally, five of the other 11 tracks were extended versions compared to the vinyl edition.

The album featured eight cover versions alongside two tracks written by Young and keyboard player Ian Kewley and one written by the guitarist in Young's band at the time, Steve Bolton. Three of the cover versions were written by Jack Lee who also wrote "Hanging on the Telephone" which was a big hit for Blondie.

The album was released with a different cover with two tracks ("Come Back and Stay" and "Love Will Tear Us Apart") shorter in length in North America, and a new video for the single "Come Back and Stay" was made.

== Critical reception ==
Professional ratings
Review scores
Source	Rating
AllMusic	4.5/5 stars
Classic Pop	4/5 stars
Number One	4/5
Rolling Stone	3/5 stars
The Rolling Stone Album Guide	4/5 stars
Smash Hits	8/10
Sounds	4/5 stars
The Village Voice	B+

Writing for Sounds, Garry Bushell called Young "a real prospect" and No Parlez "a creditable collection and a worthy launching pad" whose "well-varied contents prove he doesn't want to get stuck in any 'revivalist' rut." Claire Sheaff of Smash Hits commented that although Young's "velvet voice" rarely "seems to take off" on the album, she was hopeful "that this pop star will mature into a fully-fledged soul man. The potential is there."

In a retrospective review for AllMusic, Dave Thompson deemed No Parlez "one of the most assured debut albums of the mid-'80s, and one of the finest pop-soul confections of all time".

== Track listing ==
=== Original UK vinyl edition ===
Side one

1. "Come Back and Stay" (Jack Lee) – 4:57 (US 4:23)
2. "Love Will Tear Us Apart" (Ian Curtis, Peter Hook, Stephen Morris, Bernard Sumner) – 5:00 (US 4:17)
3. "Wherever I Lay My Hat (That's My Home)" (Marvin Gaye, Barrett Strong, Norman Whitfield) – 5:18
4. "Ku Ku Kurama" (Steve Bolton) – 4:19
5. "No Parlez" (Anthony Moore) – 4:57 (US 4:53)

Side two

1. "Love of the Common People" (John Hurley and Ronnie Wilkins) – 4:56
2. "Oh Women" (Jack Lee) – 3:35
3. "Iron Out the Rough Spots" (Steve Cropper, Booker T. Jones, David Porter) – 4:47
4. "Broken Man" (Ian Kewley, Paul Young) – 3:54
5. "Tender Trap" (Ian Kewley, Paul Young) – 4:32
6. "Sex" (Jack Lee) – 4:49

=== Original CD edition ===
1. "Come Back and Stay" (Jack Lee) – 7:56 (scratch mix)
2. "Love Will Tear Us Apart" (Ian Curtis, Peter Hook, Stephen Morris, Bernard Sumner) – 5:00
3. "Wherever I Lay My Hat (That's My Home)" (Marvin Gaye, Barrett Strong, Norman Whitfield) – 6:01 (extended club mix)
4. "Ku Ku Kurama" (Steve Bolton) – 4:19
5. "No Parlez" (Anthony Moore) – 4:57
6. "Behind Your Smile" (Ian Kewley, Paul Young) – 4:08
7. "Love of the Common People" (John Hurley, Ronnie Wilkins) – 5:51 (extended club mix)
8. "Oh Women" (Jack Lee) – 3:35
9. "Iron Out the Rough Spots" (Steve Cropper, Booker T. Jones, David Porter) – 7:28 (extended club mix)
10. "Broken Man" (Ian Kewley, Paul Young) – 3:54
11. "Tender Trap" (Ian Kewley, Paul Young) – 4:32
12. "Sex" (Jack Lee) – 6:51 (extended club mix)

== Production ==
- Laurie Latham – producer, engineer
- Tim Young – mastering
- CBS Studios (London) – mastering location
- Jason Bakx – sleeve artwork
- Eric Watson – photography
- Barry Watts – inner sleeve photography,
- Mark Irving – inner sleeve photography
- Martin Serene – inner sleeve photography
- Ged Doherty – inner sleeve photography, management

== Personnel ==
- Paul Young – lead vocals, backing vocals, guitars (1, 10), arrangements
- Ian Kewley – acoustic piano, Oberheim OB-X, E-mu Emulator, vocoder, atmospheric sounds, strings, marimbas, bells, backing vocals, arrangements
- Matt Irving – ARP synthesizer, Roland MC-4 Microcomposer, guitars, bass guitar (2, 7), backing vocals
- Steve Bolton – acoustic piano doodlings, guitars, lap steel guitar
- Pino Palladino – bass guitar (1, 3–6, 8, 10, 11, 12), Chapman Stick (1, 10)
- Mark Pinder – drums, Simmons drums, Roland TR-808, percussion, cowbells
- Rico Rodriguez – trombone (7, 11)
- Laurie Latham – arrangements
- Kim Lesley – backing vocals, congas (12)
- Marilyn "Maz" Roberts – backing vocals
- Eyethu [Nimsa Calliza, Dagmar Krause, Chief Dawethi, Eyethu, Zundi Lekau, Wally Loate, Jabu Mbato, Fats Mogoboya and Norman Zulu] – backing vocals (5)

== Charts ==
=== Weekly charts ===
Chart performance for No Parlez
Chart (1983–1986)	Peak position
Australian Albums (Kent Music Report)	12
Austrian Albums (Ö3 Austria)	4
Danish Albums (IFPI)	6
Dutch Albums (Album Top 100)	1
European Albums (IFPI)	4
Finnish Albums (Suomen virallinen lista)	7
German Albums (Offizielle Top 100)	1
Italian Albums (AFI)	1
Japanese Albums (Oricon)	2
New Zealand Albums (RMNZ)	3
Norwegian Albums (VG-lista)	3
Swedish Albums (Sverigetopplistan)	1
Swiss Albums (Schweizer Hitparade)	1
UK Albums (Official Charts)	1
US Billboard 200	79

=== Year-end charts ===
Year-end chart performance for No Parlez
Chart (1983)	Position
Dutch Albums (Album Top 100)	39
German Albums (Offizielle Top 100)	68
Japanese Albums (Oricon)	64
New Zealand Albums (RMNZ)	46
UK Albums (OCC)	7

Chart (1984)	Position
Austrian Albums (Ö3 Austria)	23
Dutch Albums (Album Top 100)	3
Italian Albums (AFI)	2
Japanese Albums (Oricon)	15
New Zealand Albums (RMNZ)	16

== Certifications and sales ==
Certifications and sales for No Parlez
Region	Certification	Certified units/sales
Australia (ARIA)	Platinum	70,000^{^}
Canada (Music Canada)	Gold	50,000^{^}
France (SNEP)	2× Gold	200,000^{*}
Germany (BVMI)	Platinum	500,000^{^}
Japan (RIAJ)	3× Platinum	600,000^{^}
Netherlands (NVPI)	Platinum	100,000^{^}
New Zealand (RMNZ)	Platinum	15,000^{^}
Spain (Promusicae)	Platinum	100,000^{^}
United Kingdom (BPI)	3× Platinum	900,000^{^}
Summaries
Europe	—	4,000,000
^{*} Sales figures based on certification alone.^{^} Shipments figures based on certification alone.

== 2008 re-release ==
The album was re-released on 30 June 2008 in the UK and worldwide on 5 August 2008 as a 25th-anniversary edition. It contains the original 11 tracks as well as a bonus 10-track disc with a combination of B-sides, remixes and live tracks. Although the booklet claims that this is the original vinyl album on CD, three songs are shortened from their UK vinyl release; "Come Back and Stay", "Love Will Tear Us Apart" and "Love of the Common People", all of which use the respective single edits found on the original US and Canadian pressings of the album. The original UK vinyl versions can be found on CD on the 1990s 'Nice Price' re-release and the 40th Anniversary editions.

The Extended Club mixes of "Wherever I Lay My Hat" and "Sex", the full version of "Love Will Tear Us Apart" and the Scratch Mix of "Come Back and Stay", which were all included on the original CD and cassette release, were not included on the 25th anniversary edition. However, In 2013 they were all included on the compilation album Remixes and Rarities.

=== Track listing ===
1. "Come Back and Stay" (Jack Lee) (single edit) – 4:24
2. "Love Will Tear Us Apart" (Ian Curtis, Peter Hook, Stephen Morris, Bernard Sumner) (single edit) – 4:17
3. "Wherever I Lay My Hat (That's My Home)" (Marvin Gaye, Barrett Strong, Norman Whitfield) – 5:18
4. "Ku Ku Kurama" (Steve Bolton) – 4:20
5. "No Parlez" (Anthony Moore) – 4:54
6. "Love of the Common People" (John Hurley, Ronnie Wilkins) (single edit) – 4:00
7. "Oh Women" (Jack Lee) – 3:34
8. "Iron Out the Rough Spots" (Steve Cropper, Booker T. Jones, David Porter) – 4:47
9. "Broken Man" (Ian Kewley, Paul Young) – 3:55
10. "Tender Trap" (Ian Kewley, Paul Young) – 4:31
11. "Sex" (Jack Lee) – 4:49

=== Bonus Disc track listing ===
1. "Come Back and Stay" (Extended Club Mix) – 7:34 [different remix compared to the original CD release]
2. "Iron Out the Rough Spots" (Extended Club Mix) – 7:28 [same version as on the original CD release]
3. "Love of the Common People" (Extended Mix) – 5:51 [same version as on the original CD release]
4. "Behind Your Smile" – 4:10 [same as on the original CD release]
5. "I've Been Lonely for So Long" – 3:37
6. "Yours" – 5:39 [extended club mix, B-side from "Come Back and Stay")
7. "Sex" (Demo Version) – 3:49
8. "Pale Shelter" (Demo Version) – 3:50
9. "Better to Have and Don't Need" (Live Version) – 5:57 (B-side from "Love of the Common People" 12 inch)
10. "Wherever I Lay My Hat (That's My Home)" [Live Version] – 5:59 (B-side from "Love of the Common People" 12 inch)

== How the different editions compare ==
Tracks are the same versions unless stated in the notes column.

Track	Vinyl	CD/Cassette	CD (US)	Daily Mail CD	25th CD	Notes
Come Back and Stay	4:57	7:56 ^{*}	4:26 ^{**}	7:56 ^{*}	4:25 ^{**}	* Scratch Mix ** Single remix version
Love Will Tear Us Apart	5:00	5:00	4:18 *	5:00	4:18 *	* 7" version
Wherever I Lay My Hat (That's My Home)	5:18	6:02 ^{*}	5:18	6:02 ^{*}	5:18	* extended club mix
Ku Ku Kurama	4:19	4:19	4:19	4:19	4:19	
No Parlez	4:57	4:54 ^{*}	4:57	4:54 ^{*}	4:53 ^{*}	* Slightly earlier fade out
Behind Your Smile	–	4:08	–	–	4:08 ^{*}	* included on bonus CD
Love of the Common People	4:56	5:52 ^{*}	4:56	5:52 ^{*}	4:01 ^{**}	* extended club mix ** unidentified edit
Oh Women	3:35	3:35	3:35	3:35	3:35	
Iron Out the Rough Spots	4:47	7:29 ^{*}	4:47	7:29 ^{*}	4:47	* extended club mix
Broken Man	3:54	3:54	3:54	3:54	3:54	
Tender Trap	4:32	4:32	4:32	4:32	4:32	
Sex	4:49	6:53 ^{*}	4:49	6:53 ^{*}	4:49	* extended club mix

When the CD was reissued in the 1990s under Sony's 'Nice Price' range, this contained the vinyl version of the track listing. This was also the case when Demon Music Group re-released the album (alongside a bonus disc of content) for its 40th anniversary in 2024. The album has also been released on Blu-Ray Audio with Dolby Atmos 5.1 and 2024 Stereo Mixes of the original LP version newly created by David Kosten.
