= Love of the Common People =

1967 single by the Four Preps

Single by the Four Preps
- B-side: "What I Don't Know Can't Hurt Me"
- Released: January 21, 1967
- Recorded: 1966
- Genre: Pop
- Length: 2:35
- Label: Capitol
- Songwriter: John Hurley and Ronnie Wilkins
- Producer: Al De Lory

The Four Preps singles chronology
"Let's Call It a Day Girl" (1966)	"Love of the Common People" (1967)	"Draft Dodger Rag" (1967)

"Love of the Common People" is a song written by John Hurley and Ronnie Wilkins, eventually released in 1970 on John Hurley's album John Hurley Sings about People, but first sung in January 1967 by the Four Preps. The Four Preps' recording was not a hit, but, later in 1967, the Everly Brothers and Wayne Newton would each issue their versions of the song, both of which "bubbled under" in the US charts; Newton's version peaked at No. 106, the Everlys' at No. 114. However, the Everly Brothers' recording was a major hit in Canada, peaking at No. 4. In 1968, Irish artist Joe Dolan with backing group the Drifters recorded a version which hit the top 10 on the Irish Singles Chart, but did not chart elsewhere.

Soul group the Winstons recorded their version in 1969, where it peaked at No. 54 on the US Hot 100. A year later, Nicky Thomas had a UK hit (No. 9) with a reggae version, and Paul Young had a No. 2 UK hit (and No. 1 in several European countries) in 1983 with his interpretation of the song.

== Lyrics ==
The lyrics tell a bleak story of poverty and unemployment. There is a mention of "free food tickets," a reference to government food stamp and welfare programs, in the first line, and the lyrics also describe the subject family as having holes in their clothes, their roof and their shoes. The last verse advises the subject family to keep their faith strong and to maintain hope for improvement.

== Nicky Thomas version ==
Nicky Thomas recorded a Joe Gibbs-produced reggae version of the song in 1970, which sold over 175,000 copies in the United Kingdom and reached number 9 on the UK Singles Chart. It was Thomas's largest selling single, and, according to Steve Leggett of AllMusic, "practically defines the term 'pop reggae.'"

== Paul Young version ==
"Love of the Common People"
- European picture sleeve (including the 1983 UK rerelease)

Single by Paul Young

from the album No Parlez
- B-side: "Behind Your Smile"; "Wherever I Lay My Hat (That's My Home)"; "It's Better to Have (And Don't Need)"
- Released: January 7, 1983; November 7, 1983 (re-release)
- Genre: Blue-eyed soul
- Length: 3:33 (7"); 5:50 (12"); 4:56 (Original Album)
- Label: CBS
- Songwriter: John Hurley and Ronnie Wilkins
- Producer: Laurie Latham

Paul Young singles chronology
"Iron Out the Rough Spots" (1982)	"Love of the Common People" (1983)	"Wherever I Lay My Hat (That's My Home)" (1983)
"Come Back and Stay" (1983)	""Love of the Common People" (re-release)" (1983)	"Everytime You Go Away" (1985)

In 1983, British singer Paul Young, with backing singers The Fabulous Wealthy Tarts, released his interpretation of "Love of the Common People" as a single, but initially it failed to chart. Only after Young's first and second solo hits in 1983, with "Wherever I Lay My Hat (That's My Home)" and "Come Back and Stay", and the single's re-release did it become successful. The single peaked at No. 2 in the UK, No. 8 in Australia, and reached the No. 1 spot in Belgium, Ireland, Italy and the Netherlands. This version also contained a solo by ska and reggae trombonist Rico Rodriguez.

=== Chart performance ===
==== Weekly charts ====
Chart (1983–1984)	Peak position
Australia (Kent Music Report)	8
Austria (Ö3 Austria Top 40)	3
Belgium (Ultratop 50 Flanders)	1
Netherlands (Dutch Top 40)	1
Netherlands (Single Top 100)	1
France (IFOP)	24
Germany (GfK)	5
Ireland (IRMA)	1
New Zealand (Recorded Music NZ)	10
South Africa (Springbok Radio)	8
Switzerland (Schweizer Hitparade)	3
UK Singles (Official Charts)	2
US Billboard Hot 100	45
US Cash Box	50

==== Year-end charts ====
Chart (1984)	Position
Australia (Kent Music Report)	54
Austria (Ö3 Austria Top 40)	13
Belgium (Ultratop 50 Flanders)	8
Netherlands (Dutch Top 40)	20
Netherlands (Single Top 100)	10
Germany (Official German Charts)	34
UK Singles (Official Charts Company)	25

== Certifications ==
Region	Certification	Certified units/sales
New Zealand (RMNZ)	Gold	15,000^{‡}
^{‡} Sales+streaming figures based on certification alone.

== Other versions ==
- Soul group the Winstons recorded their version in 1969, where it peaked at No. 54 on the Hot 100.
- It was also a top 10 hit in Ireland for showband star Joe Dolan in 1968.
- Waylon Jennings recorded a version on the eponymous album in 1967. Ed Ames did the same in 1969.
- Leonard Nimoy recorded a version on his second album Two Sides of Leonard Nimoy in 1968.
- Eric Donaldson released another reggae version in 1971
- John Denver recorded a version on his album Rhymes & Reasons.
- Stiff Little Fingers released a slightly re-arranged version of the song on their album Now Then....
- Elton John recorded a version which appears on his covers album Chartbusters Go Pop, released in 1994.
- Wayne Newton recorded a version, released as a single in 1967. The single bubbled under Billboard's Hot 100, peaking at No. 6 during a five-week run on the chart, and also reached No. 33 on the Easy Listening chart.
- Bruce Springsteen recorded a version, which appears on his live album and DVD Bruce Springsteen with The Sessions Band: Live in Dublin from 2007.

== See also ==
- BRT Top 30 number-one hits of 1984
- List of Dutch Top 40 number-one singles of 1984
- List of number-one singles of 1983 (Ireland)
- List of number-one hits of 1984 (Italy)
