= I'm Gonna Tear Your Playhouse Down =

1973 single by Ann Peebles

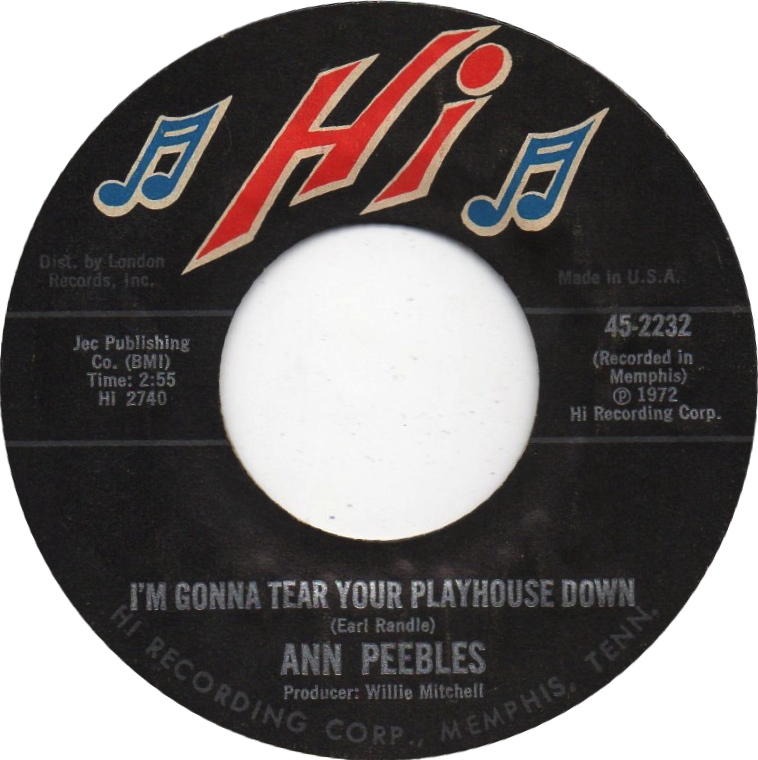

Single by Ann Peebles

from the album I Can't Stand the Rain
- B-side: "One Way Street"
- Released: January 1973
- Recorded: 1972
- Length: 2:55
- Label: Hi
- Songwriter: Earl Randle
- Producer: Willie Mitchell

Ann Peebles singles chronology
"Breaking Up Somebody's Home" (1972)	"I'm Gonna Tear Your Playhouse Down" (1973)	"I Can't Stand the Rain" (1973)

"I'm Gonna Tear Your Playhouse Down"

Single by Paul Young

from the album The Secret of Association
- B-side: "One Step Forward"
- Released: 1 October 1984 (UK); August 1985 (US)
- Recorded: 1984
- Genre: Blue-eyed Soul; synth-pop
- Length: 5:05 (album version); 4:39 (single version)
- Label: Columbia
- Songwriter: Earl Randle
- Producer: Laurie Latham

Paul Young singles chronology
"Tomb of Memories" (1985)	"I'm Gonna Tear Your Playhouse Down" (1984)	"Wonderland" (1986)

"I'm Gonna Tear Your Playhouse Down" is a song written by Memphis-based songwriter Earl Randle, and first recorded in 1972 by soul singer Ann Peebles. The song was also a hit in 1984 for English singer Paul Young.

== Ann Peebles version ==
Produced by Willie Mitchell and with performances by the Hi Rhythm Section, Ann Peebles' recording was made at the Royal Studios on South Lauderdale Avenue in Memphis. It was issued as a single on the Hi label in January 1973. It reached no.31 on the US R&B chart, and "bubbled under" the Hot 100, reaching no.111. The track was also included on her 1974 album I Can't Stand the Rain.

Writer Craig Werner said:

Like the most powerful gospel soul from the early sixties, "I'm Gonna Tear Your Playhouse Down" serves notice on a cheating lover (white America? the brothers in the Black Panther movement?) that the free ride has come to an end. It's a restatement of the revolutionary gospel anthem "Samson and Delilah," and the message, on every level, is the same: "If I had my way, I would tear this building down."

== Later versions ==
- The song was later recorded by Graham Parker and the Rumour on their 1977 album Stick to Me.
- A cover version appeared on an album called Love Blind by Morty in 1980. Morty was the vocalist with Racing Cars, a South Wales-based band. This was Morty's only solo album.
- A cover version by Paul Young reached no. 9 on the UK singles chart in 1984, and no.13 on the Billboard Hot 100 when re-released the following year. It was included on Young's album The Secret of Association (1985).

== Samples ==
- The Ann Peebles' version of "I'm Gonna Tear Your Playhouse Down" was sampled in the track "The Plan" by Wu-Tang Clan affiliated group Sunz of Man on their album The Last Shall Be First (1998).

== Charts ==
Ann Peebles

Chart (1973)	Peak position
US Bubbling Under Hot 100 (Billboard)	11
US Hot R&B/Hip-Hop Songs (Billboard)	31

Paul Young

Chart (1984)	Peak position
Australia (Kent Music Report)	25
Belgium (Ultratop 50 Flanders)	11
Finland (Suomen virallinen lista)	19
France (IFOP)	28
Ireland (IRMA)	8
Netherlands (Dutch Top 40)	12
Netherlands (Single Top 100)	17
New Zealand (Recorded Music NZ)	18
Norway (VG-lista)	9
Sweden (Sverigetopplistan)	14
Switzerland (Schweizer Hitparade)	13
UK Singles (Official Charts)	9
West Germany (GfK)	37

Chart (1985)	Peak position
Canada Top Singles (RPM)	16
UK Singles (Official Charts)	88
US Billboard Hot 100	13
US 12-inch Singles Sales (Billboard)	12
US Dance Club Songs (Billboard)	8
US Hot R&B/Hip-Hop Songs (Billboard)	60
