= Wherever I Lay My Hat (That's My Home) =

1962 song first recorded by Marvin Gaye

Song by Marvin Gaye

from the album That Stubborn Kinda Fellow
- Released: December 1962
- Recorded: September 11, 1962
- Genre: Soul
- Songwriters: Marvin Gaye, Barrett Strong and Norman Whitfield

"Wherever I Lay My Hat (That's My Home)" is a song written by Marvin Gaye, Barrett Strong and Norman Whitfield, and first recorded by Gaye in 1962. It was the B-side to his 1969 hit "Too Busy Thinking 'Bout My Baby". Paul Young's version of the song was a UK No. 1 single for three weeks in July 1983.

== Paul Young version ==
"Wherever I Lay My Hat (That's My Home)"

Single by Paul Young

from the album No Parlez
- Released: 27 May 1983
- Genre: New pop; blue-eyed soul
- Length: 4:11 (Greatest Hits version); 4:52 (7" version); 5:18 (album version); 5:59 (extended club mix)
- Label: CBS
- Songwriters: Marvin Gaye, Barrett Strong and Norman Whitfield
- Producer: Laurie Latham

Paul Young singles chronology
"Love of the Common People" (1983)	"Wherever I Lay My Hat (That's My Home)" (1983)	"Come Back and Stay" (1983)

The Paul Young version, from the album No Parlez, is stylistically notable for its use of fretless bass, played by Pino Palladino. Though a major UK hit that broke Young as a star, the song fared less well on the Billboard Hot 100, where it peaked at No. 70, but was later used in the 1986 film Ruthless People and its accompanying soundtrack album.

=== Production ===
According to Young, when he was making the album No Parlez, the label sent him a number of songs that he thought were too complex. He said: "I just want a simple three-chord trick with a melody." He remembered a B-side track by Marvin Gaye he heard when he was 14, found a recording, and decided to record the song. He slowed the song down, and added more melancholy to the vocal.

Palladino was then recruited from Jools Holland's band, Jools Holland and His Millionaires. The song was produced by Laurie Latham, who asked for an intro for the song, and Palladino quoted the bassoon melody at the opening of Stravinsky's The Rite of Spring for the opening bass line. Palladino however thought that the bass line in the recording was too loud and out of tune. The keyboard player Ian Kewley added a keyboard motif to the song, and it was then decided that the song should be released as a single.

=== Reception ===
In a retrospective review, AllMusic journalist Dave Thompson wrote that Young's version of the song "left mouths hanging open in awe" and described it as "a beautifully impassioned take on what was, in all fairness, never one of Marvin Gaye's greatest performances."

=== Charts ===
==== Weekly charts ====
Chart (1983)	Peak position
Australia (Kent Music Report)	9
Belgium (Ultratop 50 Flanders)	37
Canada Top Singles (RPM)	26
Netherlands (Single Top 100)	48
Ireland (IRMA)	1
Israel (Kol Yisrael)	9
Italy	27
New Zealand (Recorded Music NZ)	4
Sweden (Sverigetopplistan)	8
UK Singles (Official Charts)	1
US Billboard Hot 100	70
West Germany (GfK)	19

==== Year-end charts ====
Chart (1983)	Position
Australia (Kent Music Report)	72

=== Certifications ===
Certifications for Wherever I Lay My Hat
Region	Certification	Certified units/sales
United Kingdom (BPI)	Gold	500,000^{^}
^{^} Shipments figures based on certification alone.

== Other cover versions ==
Cover versions were also made by (among others): Delano Stewart (1970), Cornell Campbell (1975), John Holt (1982), The Nolans (1984), The Temptations (1986, more than 10 years after their recording it), Taylor Hicks (2006), Darren Percival (2012), Boyzone (2014), Imany (2017).
