= Paul Young =

English musician (born 1956)

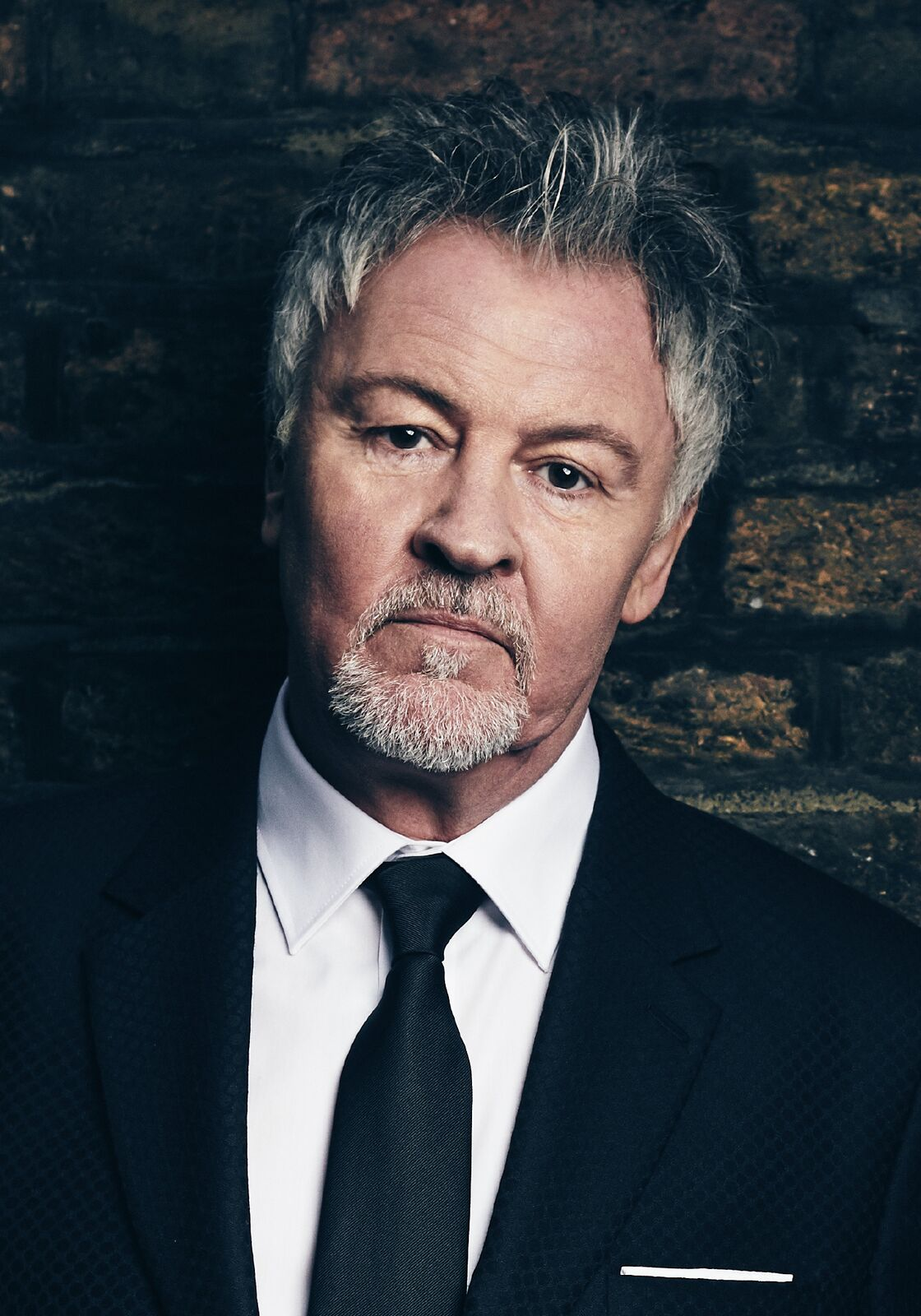
- Young in 2017
- Born: Paul Antony Young; 17 January 1956 (age 70); Luton, Bedfordshire, England
- Occupations: Musician; singer; songwriter
- Years active: 1978–present
- Spouses: Stacey Smith (m. 1987; died 2018); Lorna Young (m. 2024)
- Children: 3
- Musical career
- Genres: Pop rock; new wave; blue-eyed soul
- Instruments: Vocals; guitar; bass guitar
- Labels: Columbia Records; MCA Records; Spectra Records
- Member of: Los Pacaminos
- Formerly of: Kat Kool & the Kool Kats; Streetband; Q-Tips
- Website: www.paul-young.com

Paul Antony Young (born 17 January 1956) is an English musician, singer and songwriter. Formerly the frontman of the short-lived bands Kat Kool & the Kool Cats, Streetband and Q-Tips, he became a teen idol with his solo success in the 1980s. His hit singles include "Love of the Common People", "Wherever I Lay My Hat", "Come Back and Stay", "Every Time You Go Away" and "Everything Must Change", all reaching the top 10 of the UK Singles Chart. Released in 1983, his debut album, No Parlez, was the first of three UK number-one albums.

Young's smooth yet soulful voice belongs to a genre known as "blue-eyed soul". He won a Brit Award for Best British Male in 1985, and his hit "Every Time You Go Away" reached number one on the Billboard Hot 100 and won Best British Video at the 1986 Brit Awards. Performing on the 1984 charity single "Do They Know It's Christmas?" which included singing the opening lines, Young played Live Aid held at Wembley Stadium, London in July 1985. He sang the Crowded House track "Don't Dream It's Over" at the Nelson Mandela 70th Birthday Tribute in 1988. In 1992, he sang "Radio Ga Ga" with the surviving members of Queen at The Freddie Mercury Tribute Concert. Since the mid-1990s, Young has performed with the band Los Pacaminos.

== Early life ==
Paul Young was born in Luton, Bedfordshire, England. He has an older brother, Mark, and a younger sister, Jo. As a youth, after school, he played football for the Vauxhall Motors factory where he worked. In his spare time, he played in several bands as a bass guitarist.

== Career ==
The first group for which Young became lead singer was Kat Kool & the Kool Kats. In the late 1970s, he joined Streetband, who had one top 20 hit in the UK, with the humorous novelty track "Toast". In December 1979, Streetband disbanded.

=== Q-Tips ===
The ex-Streetbanders added new recruits Dave Lathwell on guitar and Baz Watts on drums and became Q-Tips. In addition, a four piece brass section was created. Q-Tips's first rehearsals took place in November 1979. Their first concert was on 18 November 1979 at the Queens Arms Hotel in Harrow. This gig was followed by another at the Horn of Plenty in St Albans. By 1 April 1980, the band had recorded two tracks, "SYSLJFM (The Letter Song)", and "Having a Party", both recorded at the Livingstone Studios in Barnet. Constant touring and concert appearances had built a strong fan base by mid-1981. The professionalism of the band had attracted the attention of several record labels, with the late Mickie Most (RAK Records) confirming on BBC Radio 1's Round Table programme that Q-Tips "...are easily the best live band working at the moment". In August 1980, the British music magazine NME reported that Q-Tips had released their debut, eponymous album.

Q-Tips appeared on BBC Television's In Concert, Rock Goes to College and The Old Grey Whistle Test in the latter part of 1981. Q-Tips also opened for the J. Geils Band, the Knack, Thin Lizzy, Bob Marley and the Average White Band. The band toured with After the Fire and supported the Who on their 12-date UK tour in 1980. In 1981, Q-Tips played the Montreux Jazz Festival.

With poor record sales after the release of two albums and seven singles, Q-Tips broke up in early 1982 when Young signed a solo recording contract with CBS. Young briefly teamed up again with Q-Tips for a reunion tour in 1993.

=== Solo career and pop stardom ===
Young was signed by Columbia Records as a solo performer. Together with ex-Q-Tips member Ian Kewley, Young began writing and recording songs for his debut album, the breakthrough No Parlez. Young's new backing band, The Royal Family, included keyboardist Kewley, fretless bass player Pino Palladino, guitarist Steve Bolton, drummer Mark Pinder, and backing singers Maz Roberts and Kim Leslie a.k.a. The Fabulous Wealthy Tarts. His first single, "Iron Out the Rough Spots", had no success, and neither did the second one, a cover of "Love of the Common People", although the song was a hit after a rerelease as a single later the same year, in the UK (and elsewhere). The third, a cover of the Marvin Gaye song "Wherever I Lay My Hat", reached No. 1 in the UK Singles Chart for three weeks in July and August 1983. It was the first of Young's 14 British Top 40 singles.

Similar success followed all over Europe. In the UK, follow-up single "Come Back and Stay" reached No. 4, and a re-release of "Love of the Common People" made it to No. 2 and even received radio airplay in the United States (thanks to its soundtrack inclusion in John Hughes's film Sixteen Candles), and his debut album No Parlez was certified platinum in various countries. In the UK, No Parlez spent five weeks at No. 1, and "Wherever I Lay My Hat" and "Love of the Common People" became the 14th and 15th best-selling singles of 1983.

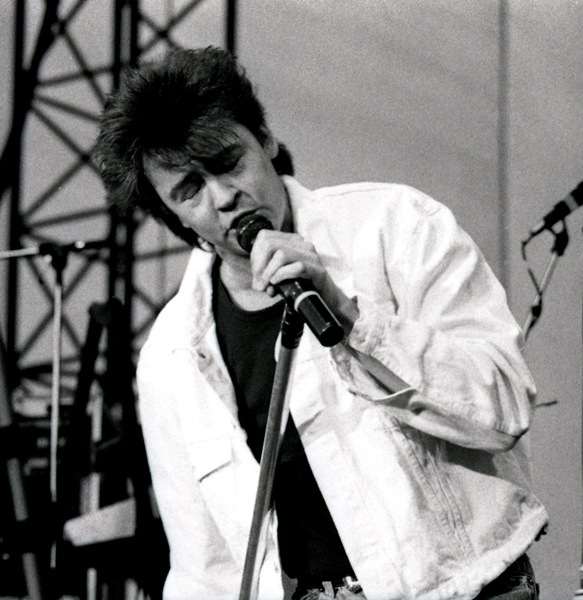
Young performing in Budapest, Hungary, on 18 June 1987

The year 1984 was difficult for Young. His first heavy promotional and live concert tour of America strained his vocal cords to the extent that he was forced to rest his voice and did not sing for much of the year. He recovered sufficiently to become involved with the Band Aid single "Do They Know It's Christmas?", an all-star charity project put together by Bob Geldof and Midge Ure for Ethiopian famine relief. Young sang the opening lines of the song as a replacement for David Bowie. The song became the Christmas number one.

Young returned to the UK Top Ten with a version of Ann Peebles' "I'm Gonna Tear Your Playhouse Down". The latter appeared on his second album, The Secret of Association, released in 1985, which secured his future success in the United States, Japan and Australia. The album went to No. 1 in the UK. That year, Young scored the biggest worldwide hit of his career with "Everytime You Go Away", a cover of a song from the 1980 Hall & Oates album Voices. "Everytime You Go Away" was his biggest success in the U.S. At the 1985 Brit Awards, Young received the award for Best British Male. Associated with the Second British Invasion of the US, "Everytime You Go Away" reached number one on the Billboard Hot 100 in 1985. It also won Best British Video at the 1986 Brit Awards.

In July 1985, Young appeared at Live Aid at Wembley Stadium, London, performing his own hits "Come Back and Stay" and "Everytime You Go Away". Alison Moyet joined him on stage to perform "That's The Way Love Is". He also joined the other artists at the end of the concert for the performance of Band Aid's "Do They Know It's Christmas?".

During parts of 1987, Young toured extensively as the opening act for Genesis on their Invisible Touch Tour. Young played more than 35 dates in 13 countries. The tour concluded from 1–4 July 1987 with four sold-out shows playing to more than 350,000 fans at Wembley Stadium in London.

In 1990, he released a cover of The Chi-Lites' "Oh Girl", which peaked at No. 8 on the Billboard Hot 100. Young sang the Crowded House track "Don't Dream It's Over" at the Nelson Mandela 70th Birthday Tribute in 1988, producing a popular duet, "Senza una donna (Without a Woman)," with Italian blues singer Zucchero in 1991, and singing "Radio Ga Ga" with the surviving members of Queen in 1992, at The Freddie Mercury Tribute Concert soon after Freddie Mercury died. In 1991, he recorded a duet with Irish group Clannad for the Blake Edwards film Switch, a cover of the Joni Mitchell song, "Both Sides Now".

"Don't Dream It's Over", "Senza una donna (Without a Woman)" and "Both Sides Now" were featured on Young's first greatest hits album, From Time To Time – The Singles Collection (1991).

In 1993, Young was dropped from his contract with the CBS/Sony Records label. He contributed to the Vangelis album Voices in 1995. Young sang the British national anthem, "God Save the Queen", at Wembley Stadium before England's Euro '96 semi-final match against Germany.

Young's next album, Paul Young, was released in 1997 on East West Records. In November 2001, when Young was on the final night of the Here and Now tour, Michael Aspel awarded him his This is Your Life book. In 2006, he released Rock Swings – On the Wild Side of Swing.

In 2010, Young recorded and released a new track "Come Back", a duet he did with electronic dance music act Chicane. The single was a sample of Young's 1983 hit "Come Back and Stay", and charted at 151 on the UK Singles Chart. The single was recorded onto Chicane's 2010 album Giants. After a lengthy absence of recorded material, Young released an album of vintage soul songs in 2016 called Good Thing and began a lengthy period of tours and festival appearances.

=== Los Pacaminos ===
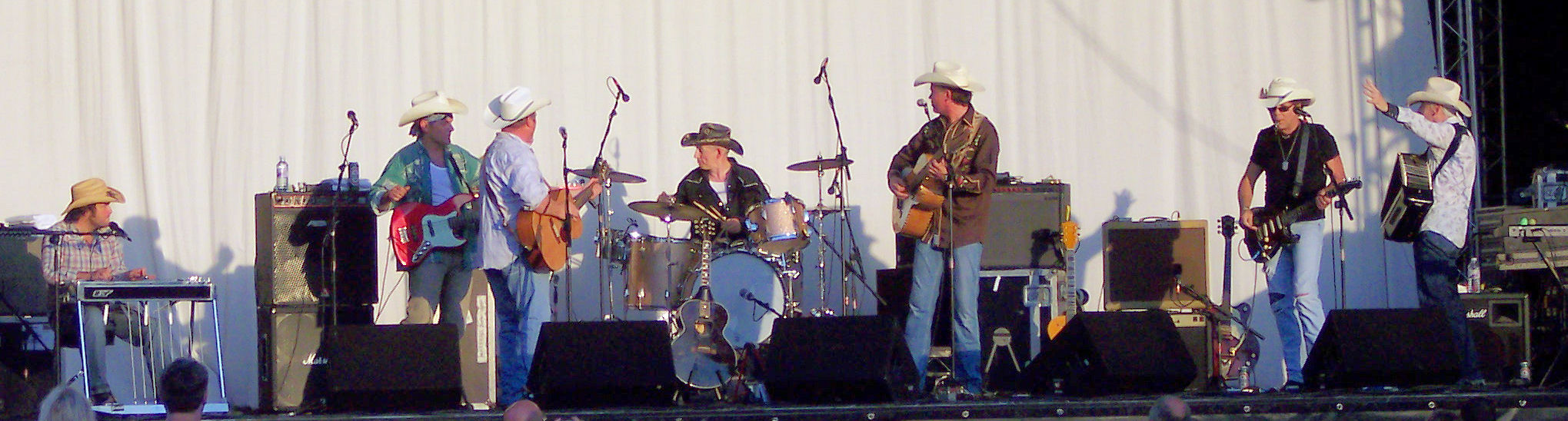
Los Pacaminos at the 2006 Wickham Festival

Young first formed Los Pacaminos in 1993. The reason for the group forming was Young's desire to get back to basics. He said: "I was between record labels and writing material for a new album but I wanted to play live again. I've always loved the Tex-Mex sound and knew a few musicians who had a similar passion for this type of music. So I asked them to join me in forming a band."

The group's early performances were in bars and clubs, performing a mixture of their own material and covers. The album Los Pacaminos was released in 2002.

The band have performed and recorded throughout Europe and the UK. In 2014, the band released their second album, A Fistful of Statins. Other media released by the band include an EP and a live album. They are still performing live concerts as of 2025.

=== Collaborations ===
Young's earliest collaboration was in the late 1970s on Streetband's first album London, when Ian Dury made a guest appearance on the track "Mystery". In between the Q-Tips and the launch of his solo career, Young sang backing vocals on the Squeeze single "Black Coffee in Bed" with Elvis Costello. Young's best-known musical collaboration (apart from Los Pacaminos) was his early collaboration with bassist Pino Palladino. Palladino, who had collaborated with Tears for Fears, Go West and Gary Numan, featured on four of Young's albums: No Parlez, The Secret of Association, The Crossing and Paul Young. Palladino was the bass player in Young's backing band The Royal Family and played at Live Aid.

Young released a cover version of the Joni Mitchell song "Both Sides, Now" with Irish group Clannad for the 1991 motion picture Switch.

== Personal life ==
Young met his wife, former model Stacey Smith, on his video for "Come Back and Stay" in 1983. They married while they were living in Los Angeles in November 1987. They went on to have two daughters and a son. Young and Smith separated in May 2006 and then reconciled in March 2009. During the separation, Smith had a son, Jude, with businessman Ilan Slazenger. On 26 January 2018, it was announced that Stacey Young had died of brain cancer, aged 52.

Young is a close friend of former Spandau Ballet lead singer Tony Hadley, who appeared alongside Young on "Do They Know It's Christmas?". The two toured Australia and New Zealand during October and November 2008.

== Discography ==
- No Parlez (1983)
- The Secret of Association (1985)
- Between Two Fires (1986)
- Other Voices (1990)
- The Crossing (1993)
- Reflections (1994)
- Paul Young (1997)
- Rock Swings – On the Wild Side of Swing (2006)
- Good Thing (2016)
- Behind the Lens (2023)
