= My Brother's Blues =

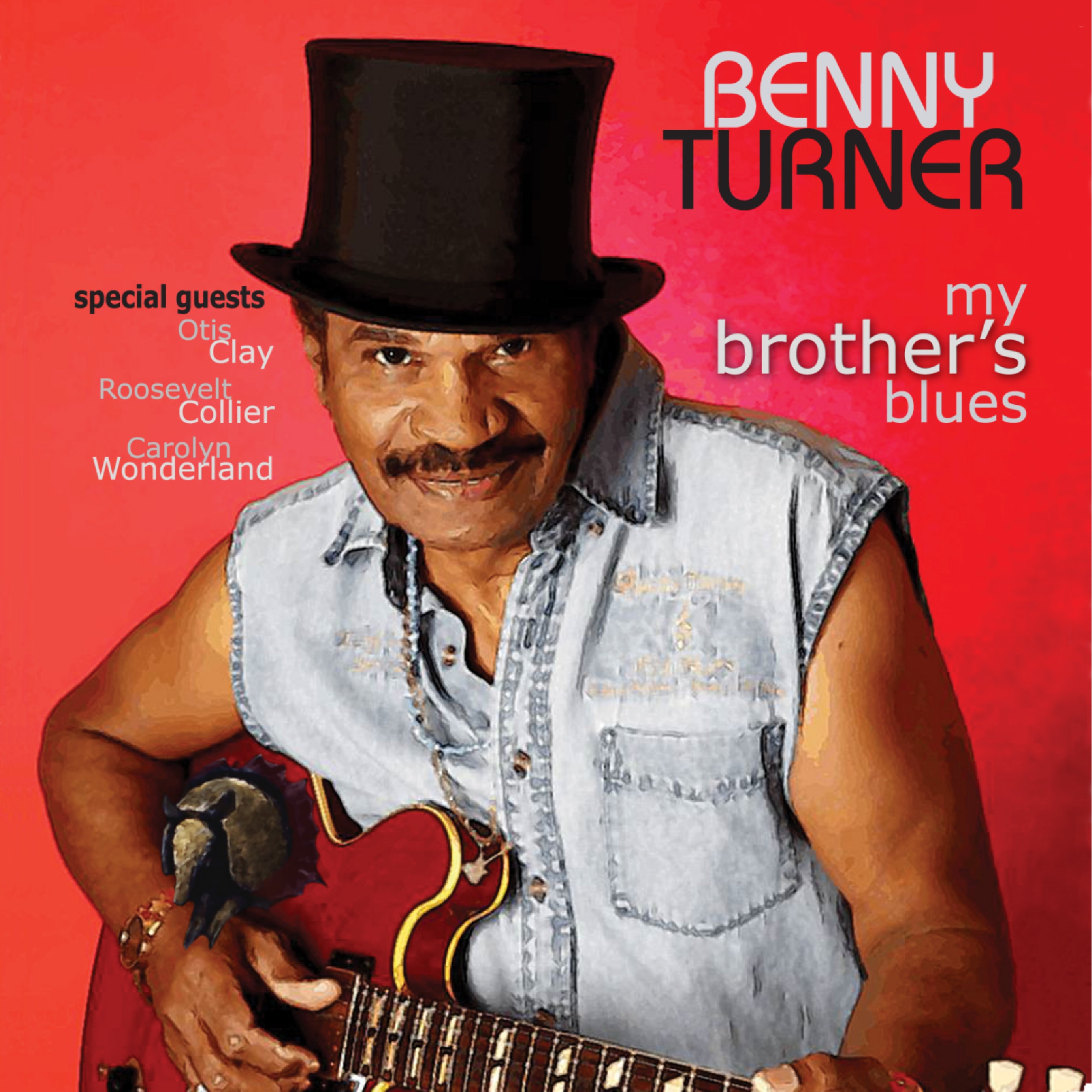

Studio album by Benny Turner
- Released: September 15, 2017
- Genre: Blues
- Length: 51:12
- Label: Nola Blue
- Producer: Jack Miele

Benny Turner chronology
Journey (2014)	My Brother's Blues (2017)	When She's Gone (2016)

My Brother's Blues is the fourth album from bluesman Benny Turner. My Brother's Blues, released in 2017, is a tribute to Turner's brother and bandmate, Freddie King. The album contains 11 titles from King's songbook, all chosen because they have special meaning to Turner.

== Track listing ==
1. "Big Legged Woman"
2. "It's Your Move"
3. "Have You Ever Loved a Woman"
4. "I'm Tore Down"
5. "You've Got to Love Her with a Feeling"
6. "I'm Ready"
7. "See See Baby"
8. "Mojo Boogie"
9. "Wee Baby Blues"
10. "Ghetto Woman"
11. "Same Old Blues"

== Personnel ==
- Benny Turner – bass, lead vocals, background vocals, lead guitar, tambourine
- Earl Smith – background vocals
- Kathy Murray – background vocals
- June Yamagishi – lead guitar
- Derwin "Big D" Perkins – rhythm guitar
- Jack Miele – lead guitar, rhythm guitar
- Alonzo Johnson – bass
- Keiko Komaki – keyboards, B3
- Joe Krown – keyboards, B3
- Davell Crawford – B3
- Chizuko Yoshihiro – piano
- Barney Floyd – trumpet
- Tracy Griffin – trumpet
- Jason Mingledorff – saxophone
- Greg Dawson – saxophone
- Jeffery "Jellybean" Alexander – drums

Guests

- Otis Clay – lead vocals, background vocals
- Roosevelt Collier – lap steel
- Carolyn Wonderland – background vocals, lead guitar, rhythm guitar
- Marva Wright – lead vocals (appears from a previous recording)

== Awards and reviews ==
Global Music Awards – Silver Medal for Outstanding Achievement – February 2018

16th Independent Music Awards – Nominee for Tribute CD

Placed #32 on Living Blues Radio Chart's Top 50 Blues Albums for 2017

"On this project, Benny once again proves that he can hold his own with the best of them in the music business, and if you like classic soul blues with horns and righteous keyboards, this album will certainly tickle your blues fancy." – Blues Blast Magazine
