= Joe Krown =

American R&B/blues/jazz keyboardist

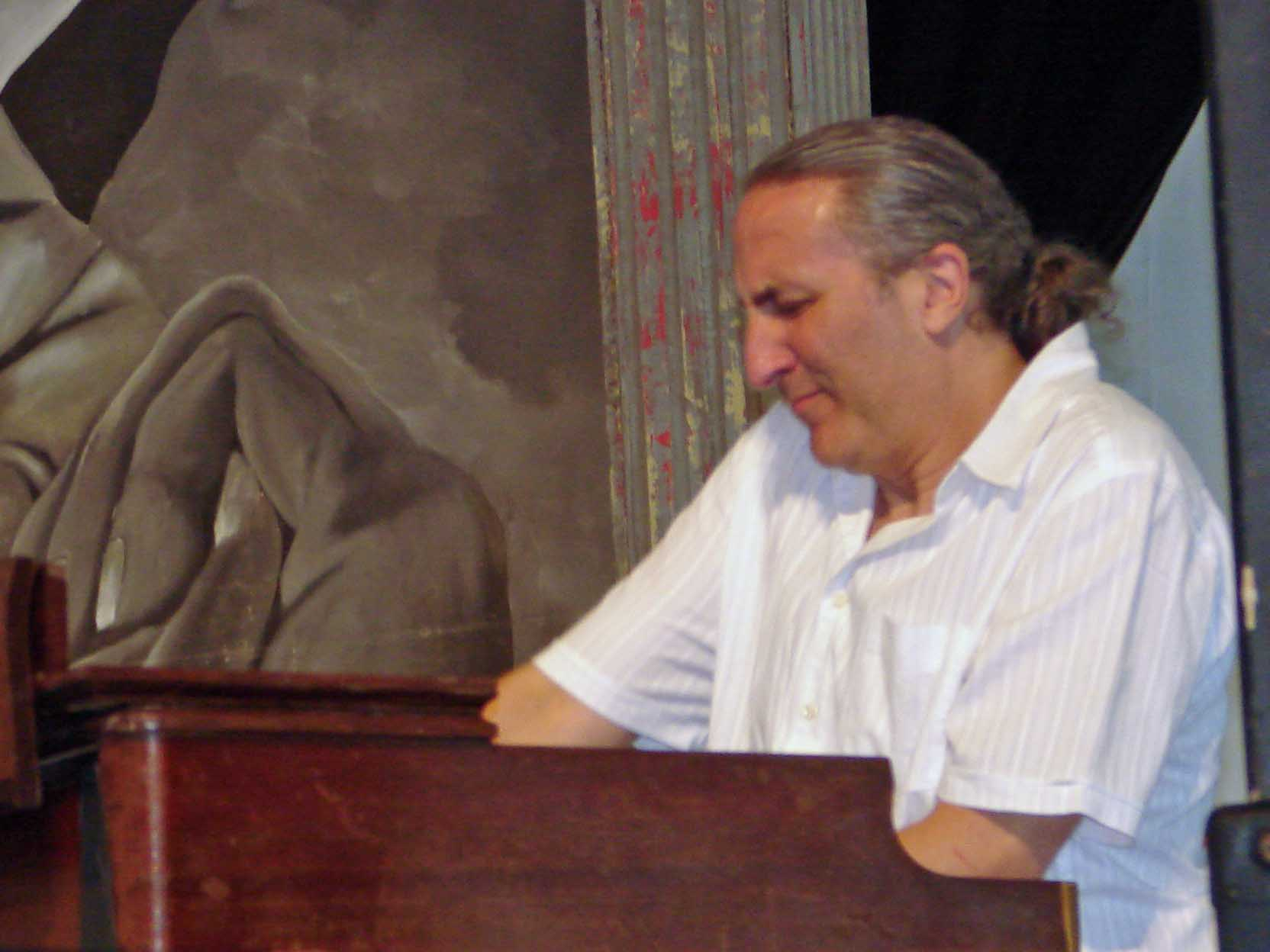
- Krown playing at the New Orleans Jazz & Heritage Festival, 2008

Background information
- Genres: Rhythm and blues, blues, funk
- Occupation: Musician
- Instrument: Keyboards
- Years active: 1980s–present
- Labels: STR Digital, ShortStack
- Website: JoeKrown.com

Joe Krown is an American keyboardist, based in New Orleans, Louisiana. Apart from being a solo artist, he is the full time member of Kenny Wayne Shepherd band. He plays New Orleans styled piano and also Hammond B3 organ.

Krown has played regularly at the New Orleans Jazz & Heritage Festival since 2001 and at the French Quarter Festival since 1998.

== Biography ==
=== Early years ===
Krown was raised in Westbury, Long Island, New York. He started playing piano in his childhood. While attending the State University of New York at Buffalo, he discovered the Hammond organ, and soon left the University to pursue career as a professional musician.

In the 1980s, Krown relocated to Boston, formed his own band with his then wife and played around New York and New England. During this time he joined Chuck Berry's back up band featuring Nashville producer Tom Hambridge on drums and toured with him on the East Coast. They also backed up 1950s doo-wop acts such as the Platters, Marvellettes and the Drifters.

Krown joined ex-Muddy Waters guitarist Luther "Guitar Junior" Johnson's band in the late 1980s. He toured nationally and internationally and recorded two albums with Johnson during his tenure with his band.

=== With Clarence "Gatemouth" Brown ===
In 1991, Krown moved to New Orleans to join Clarence "Gatemouth" Brown's band, Gate's Express. From then on he held the keyboard chair of the band until Gatemouth's death in 2005. Krown recorded four albums with him, and toured across U.S. and overseas. In 1995, Gatemouth was chosen as an opening act for Eric Clapton's world tour, and Krown toured with him as a member of the band.

=== Solo career ===
In 1998 he debuted as a solo artist. He released Just the Piano...Just the Blues on STR Digital Records. It was a piano solo album in traditional blues and boogie woogie style.

The Joe Krown Organ Combo was formed in 1999. The Joe Krown Organ Combo performed every week at one of the many New Orleans nightclubs, including the Maple Leaf Bar, House of Blues, Tipitina's, Le Bon Temps Roule and dba. The "Combo" makes regular appearances at the French Quarter Festival in New Orleans and the New Orleans Jazz & Heritage Festival. The band made its European debut in November 2001 at the Ingolstadt Jazztage in Ingolstadt Germany. The Joe Krown Organ Combo has four CD releases. Down & Dirty (1999), Buckle Up (2000) and Funk Yard (2002) were all released on the New Orleans label STR Digital. The Joe Krown Organ Combo’s latest release, Livin' Large was released in February 2005 and is Krown's first self-produced, independently released CD (JK1001).

Apart from the Organ Combo, Krown started to play with guitarist John Fohl and harmonica/accordion player Johnny Sansone in 2000. They played traditional blues with Krown on piano, and Fohl and Sansone sharing the vocal duties. This trio Sansone, Krown & Fohl released a self-titled album from Sansone's label ShortStack Records in 2004.

Krown has two solo piano CDs on the New Orleans label STR Digital. Just the Piano...Just the Blues (1998) and New Orleans Piano Rolls (2003). Both are solo piano performance featuring original New Orleans piano/boogie-woogie style compositions and classic New Orleans piano songs. His current solo piano CD, Exposed (JK1005) is the follow-up to the STR Digital CDs. He has been a headline performer at WWOZ's Piano Night during the New Orleans Jazz & Heritage Festival every year since 1997. Krown plays regular solo piano performances in New Orleans at Ralph's on the Park, Le Bon Temps and the Jazz Playhouse in the Sonesta Hotel on Bourbbon St. In October 2005, after Hurricane Katrina and the failures of the federal levee systems destroyed Krown's home city of New Orleans, he returned home and started playing around New Orleans with his piano trio, the Joe Krown Trio. In March 2007, Krown released his eighth album, Old Friends (JK1002) featuring the trio.

In early 2007, Krown started playing every Sunday night at the Maple Leaf Bar (New Orleans with Walter "Wolfman" Washington (guitar and vocals) and Russell Batiste, Jr. (drums). It featured Krown playing Hammond B-3 organ where he plays all the bass parts on the organ. The trio released a live CD, Live at the Maple Leaf in October 2008. It was produced by Krown and was his first live CD. In late 2010, the trio released Triple Threat, the follow up to Live at the Maple Leaf Bar and their first studio CD. The trio released its third album, Soul Understanding for Jazz Fest in 2013. The trio was invited to be part of 15 city U.S. tour called "New Orleans Nights" (November 2010). The band was a feature along with Nicholas Payton and Allen Toussaint. In late 2017, Wayne Maureau replaced Russell Batiste, Jr. in the trio.

After the death of Allen Toussaint in November 2015, Krown was selected to play piano with Toussaint's band for a Toussaint Tribute set at the 2016 New Orleans Jazz & Heritage Festival. It featured stars including Bonnie Raitt, Aaron Neville, Irma Thomas, Dr. John and Cyril Neville.

At the 29th annual WWOZ Piano Night at the New Orleans House of Blues in 2017, Krown appeared as a performer and also played the role of producer selecting other piano players for the event. From then on, he was named the permanent producer of the event.

Krown made his acting debut in the HBO series Treme. He did a scene in Season 1, episode 4; "At the Foot of Canal Street" (air date 5/2/10) and Season 3, episode 5; "I Thought I Heard Buddy Bolden Say" (air date 10/21/12). He also has music from some of his CDs featured on the show. "Moore Women Shuffle" (from Piano Rolls) was featured in "Meet De Boys on the Battlefront" (air date 4/18/10) and "All That and Then Some" (from Exposed) was in "I Thought I Heard Buddy Bolden Say" (air date 10/21/12). Krown can also be seen in several episodes of the TNT series Memphis Beat and the De Niro/Stallone movie Grudge Match (2013).

=== With Kenny Wayne Shepherd ===
In June 2017 Krown joined the Kenny Wayne Shepherd Band as the full time keyboard player.

== Awards ==
Krown has been nominated twice and won a 2000 New Orleans Big Easy Award in the Blues category. His trio with Johnny Sansone & John Fohl has also won a 2004 New Orleans Big Easy Award in the Blues category. His Hammond organ trio featuring Louisiana guitarist Walter “Wolfman” Washington won a 2009 New Orleans Big Easy Award in the Blues Category and a 2009 OffBeat Award for Best R&B/Funk Album for Live at the Maple Bar album. In April 2014, he was honored with a Piano Legacy Award, presented by the New Orleans Jazz Orchestra and for being a "Master of Piano".

== Discography ==
=== Albums as leader ===
- 1997: Just The Piano...Just The Blues (STR Digital 9703) solo piano
- 1999: Down & Dirty (STR Digital 9902) Organ Combo
- 2000: Buckle Up (STR Digital 1002) Organ Combo
- 2002: Funk Yard (STR Digital 1007) Organ Combo
- 2003: New Orleans Piano Rolls (STR Digital 1012) solo piano
- 2004: Sansone, Krown & Fohl (ShortStack 7905)
- 2005: Livin' Large (Joe Krown JK1001) Organ Combo
- 2007: Old Friends (Joe Krown JK1002) Piano Trio
- 2008: Live at the Maple Leaf (Joe Krown JK1003) with Walter "Wolfman" Washington and Russell Batiste Jr.
- 2010: Triple Threat (Joe Krown JK1004) with Walter "Wolfman" Washington and Russell Batiste Jr.
- 2012: Exposed (Joe Krown JK1005) solo piano
- 2013: Soul Understanding (Joe Krown JK1006) with Walter "Wolfman" Washington and Russell Batiste Jr.
- 2021: City Country City (Gulf Coast) with Jason Ricci
- 2023: Tribute (Sledgehammer Blues 2-AQM-1069)

=== With Luther "Guitar Junior" Johnson ===
- 1990: I Want to Groove with You (Bullseye Blues)
- 1992: It's Good to Me (Bullseye Blues)

=== With Clarence "Gatemouth" Brown ===
- 1994: The Man (Verve/Gitanes)
- 1997: Gate Swings (Verve/Gitanes)
- 1999: American Music, Texas Style (Blue Thumb/Verve)
- 2001: Back to Bogalusa (Blue Thumb/Verve)
- 2003: Clarence "Gatemouth" Brown in Concert (in-akustik --- DVD)
- 2006: Carlos Santana Presents Blues at Montreux 2004 (RED Distribution --- DVD)

=== With Kenny Wayne Shepherd ===
- 2017: The Traveler (Concord)
- 2020: Straight To You: Live (ADA/Provogue)

=== Other works ===
- 1997: Marva Wright: Bluesiana Mama (AIM)
- 1998: Bobby Charles: Secret of the Heart (Stony Plain)
- 1999: Johnny Sansone: Watermelon Patch (Bullseye Blues)
- 2000: Kid Ramos: West Coast House Party (Evidence)
- 2003: Mathilda Jones: There's Something Inside Me and It's Called the Blues (Southland)
- 2003: various: Patchwork - A Tribute to James Booker (STR Digital)
- 2004: Amanda Shaw: I'm Not A Bubble Gum Pop Princess (Little Fiddle)
- 2004: Bobby Charles: Last Train to Memphis (Rice 'n' Gravy)
- 2005: Juice: Hey Buddy (DJR)"
- 2008: Bobby Charles: Homemade Songs (Rice 'n' Gravy)
- 2011: Zigaboo Modeliste: New Life (JZM)
- 2019: Benny Turner: My Brother's Blues (Nola Blue Records)
- 2019: Bobby Rush: Sitting on Top of the Blues (Deep Rush)
- 2019: Denise LaSalle: Mississippi Woman/Steppin' Out (JSP Records)
- 2019: Cash McCall / Benny Turner: Going Back Home (Nola Blue Records)
