= Voodoo Music + Arts Experience =

Music and arts festival in Louisiana, US

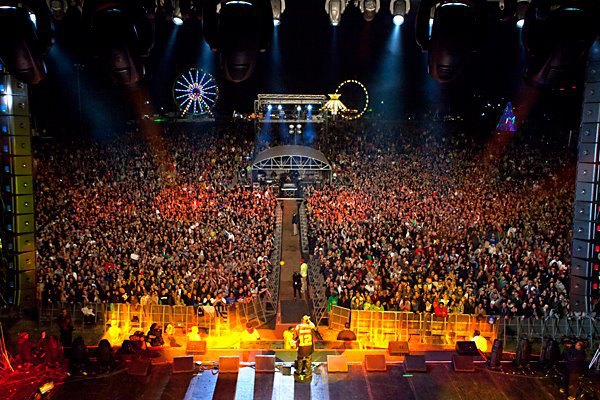
- Snoop Dogg performs on the main stage in 2011
- Status: Inactive; cancelled 2022
- Genre: Music festival
- Frequency: Annually
- Venue: City Park
- Locations: New Orleans, Louisiana
- Country: United States
- Years active: 21
- Inaugurated: October 29, 1999
- Previous event: 25–27 October 2019
- Website: www.voodoofestival.com

The Voodoo Music + Arts Experience (formerly The Voodoo Music Experience), commonly referred to as Voodoo or Voodoo Fest, was a multi-day music and arts festival held in City Park in New Orleans, Louisiana. First started in 1999, it was last held in October 2019, after being canceled in 2020 and 2021 due to the COVID-19 pandemic, and canceled in 2022 without explanation.

The Voodoo Experience has hosted a wide variety of artists, and has had as many as 180,000 festival-goers in 2018. Voodoo is owned by Live Nation Entertainment, which acquired a majority stake in 2013, and was produced by its Austin-based subsidiary C3 Presents after being acquired. Don Kelly, Voodoo's former General Counsel and COO, is Festival Director has overseen the event.

The Voodoo Experience is known for including national artists from all genres, such as Stone Temple Pilots, Foo Fighters, Marilyn Manson, Pearl Jam, Metallica, Rage Against the Machine, Muse, Eminem, Red Hot Chili Peppers, Arcade Fire, Tiësto, Nine Inch Nails, Kiss, R.E.M., Modest Mouse, Thirty Seconds to Mars, Calvin Harris, The Weeknd, Deadmau5, The Black Keys, Neil Young, Green Day, Snoop Dogg, Duran Duran, Porcupine Tree, The Smashing Pumpkins, My Chemical Romance, 50 Cent, and 311 as well as local Louisiana musicians such as Cowboy Mouth, The Original Meters, Trombone Shorty and Orleans Avenue, The Preservation Hall Jazz Band, Rebirth Brass Band, and Dr. John.

== History ==
From its 1999 Halloween weekend debut, until the last event in 2019, the annual event was a Halloween tradition for music fans, both locally and others who travel from around the world. Throughout Voodoo’s 21-year run, more than one million festival-goers gathered to see performances from roughly 2,000 artists. The event was twice nominated for Pollstar's Music Festival of the Year, and in 2005, Voodoo founder Stephen Rehage and his team were presented with a key to the city, following the Voodoo 2005 post-Katrina event.

=== Creation and growth ===
Voodoo was first held as a single-day event on October 30, 1999, at Tad Gormley Stadium in City Park. Planned and executed by Stephen Rehage, CEO of Rehage Entertainment, the festival consisted of three stages and a mix of local and national acts including headliners Wyclef Jean and Moby. As the U.S. festival market swelled, Voodoo continued its growth, increasing both the festival site and musically expanding with the addition of stages and performers.

During its second year in 2000, Voodoo became a two-day event, and garnered international attention with a headlining performance from Eminem in support of his debut album, The Slim Shady LP. In 2007, Voodoo expanded to a three-day event.

=== Hurricane Katrina ===
Originally scheduled for Halloween weekend of 2005 in New Orleans’ City Park, the Voodoo Music Experience was displaced by the tragedy of Hurricane Katrina. While plans were in full swing to relocate to Memphis, Voodoo founder Stephen Rehage met with community leaders in New Orleans about the opportunity to move the event back home for one of its two days—as a tribute event for relief workers. Festival organizers and Memphis representatives agreed this was an amazing opportunity to increase the scope of the event.

==== New Orleans event ====
On October 29, 2005, an invitation-only celebration (previous ticket holders exempt) for police, firefighters, National Guard, military and countless others who had aided in the recovery efforts of the city was staged at the fly in Audubon Park in New Orleans, one of the few public spaces in the city not damaged in the recent federal levee failure disaster. Nine Inch Nails, Queens of the Stone Age, the Secret Machines, the New York Dolls, and Kermit Ruffins were among the artists who came together in celebration of a city they love.

It marked the first major multi-musical performance in the two months since Hurricane Katrina’s effects were felt in the city.

==== Memphis event ====
Voodoo in Memphis included a fundraiser for victims of the Hurricane Katrina disaster in AutoZone Park.

=== 2006–2015 ===
The 2006 Voodoo Music Experience saw the debut of three distinct areas on six stages within the festival's landscape: Le Ritual, Le Flambeau and Le Carnival. Each of these areas was designed to uniquely showcase different sides of the personality of the festival and its New Orleans home: "Le Flambeau" featured music and sounds consistent with the style of The Big Easy; "Le Ritual" featured more mainstream music; and finally "Le Carnival" featured indie bands, burlesque and circus acts.

In 2007, Voodoo expanded to three days and broke all previous attendance records with an estimated 100,000+ fans in attendance.

In April 2013, the Voodoo Music + Arts Experience announced an initial 15 acts to commemorate the 15th anniversary of Voodoo. The initial 15 acts include Pearl Jam, Nine Inch Nails, Calvin Harris, Bassnectar, Paramore, Macklemore & Ryan Lewis, Afrojack, Boys Noize, The Gaslight Anthem, Big Gigantic, How To Destroy Angels, Cults, Alkaline Trio, Desaparecidos and Robert DeLong. The 15th anniversary Voodoo celebration also marked the debut of City Park’s Festival Grounds, a new permanent home for Voodoo. Home to Voodoo since its 1999 debut—with the exception of Voodoo 2005, which was displaced by the city’s hurricane damage—New Orleans’ 1,300-acre City Park is the region’s principal recreation site that attracts over seven million visitors each year.

In October 2013, a controlling stake in the festival was sold to Live Nation Entertainment, amid growing financial issues. Rehage retained a 49% stake in the event, and became Live Nation's President of North American Festivals.

The final day of the 2015 edition was canceled due to inclement weather.

=== 2016–2022 ===
In 2016, operations for the festival were taken over by Live Nation subsidiary C3 Presents, organizers of Lollapalooza and the Austin City Limits Music Festival, with Sig Greenebaum and Don Kelly promoted to co-directors in place of Rehage. With the new management, the festival underwent changes to its stage layout and infrastructure. Attendance peaked at around 150,000. The 2019 festival was hampered by Tropical Storm Olga, which brought extensive rain to the New Orleans area.

The 2020 festival was canceled due to the COVID-19 pandemic. Although it announced plans to return in 2021, Voodoo announced in June 2021 that the festival had been cancelled and would not be held again until 2022, with no reason given. In June 2022, it was announced that the 2022 festival would not be held.

== Line-ups ==
=== 1999 ===
The 1999 Voodoo Music + Arts Experience was held on October 31, 1999.

Official lineup:
- Wyclef Jean and the Refugee All-Stars
- George Clinton and the Parliament-Funkadelic
- Moby
- Ben Folds Five
- The Roots
- Train
- Third Eye Blind
- Dr. John
- Dr. John Tribute Set
- Bamboula 2000
- Marvelous 3
- Dash Rip Rock
- Jude
- Citizen King
- Deadeye Dick
- Jon Cleary
- Cool Bone
- The Getaway People
- Bag of Doughnuts
- Michael Ray & CK
- Kathleen LaGue
- Speed Buggy

=== 2000 ===
The 2000 Voodoo Music + Arts Experience was held October 27–29, 2000.

Official lineup:
- Stone Temple Pilots
- Eminem
- Ben Harper
- The Black Eyed Peas
- Cypress Hill
- Rahzel
- Blues Traveler
- Cowboy Mouth
- 311
- Live
- Counting Crows
- Galactic
- Will Hoge
- Guster
- TUBA
- Madstone
- Section Eight
- I-cast
- Musician's Cook-off
- Getaway People

=== 2001 ===
The 2001 Voodoo Music + Arts Experience was held October 26–28, 2001.

Official lineup:
- Tool
- Snoop Dogg
- The Black Crowes
- Bush
- Gov't Mule
- Karl Denson
- John Mayer
- Missy Elliott
- Penelope Tuesdae
- Will Hoge
- Brand New Immortals
- Tricky
- G. Love and Special Sauce
- Better Than Ezra
- Dan Dyer
- Spooks
- Karl Denson's Tiny Universe
- Brint Anderson
- Treme Brass Band
- Bamboula
- Lil Rascals Brass Band
- Anders Osborne
- Marva Wright
- Matt Nyce
- Indieo
- Julius Papp
- A-Trak
- DJ Craze
- Stryfe
- Rah Smoove

=== 2002 ===
The 2002 Voodoo Music + Arts Experience was held October 25–27, 2002.

Official lineup:
- 311
- Michael Franti
- No Doubt
- Jack Johnson
- Garbage
- Crystal Method
- Counting Crows
- Spearhead
- Jurassic 5
- Down
- Macy Gray
- Sum 41
- The X-ecutioners
- Cut Chemist
- Z-Trip
- Galactic
- North Mississippi Allstars
- Brunch w/ Blind Boyz
- Bouva
- El Angel
- hed pe
- Stryfe
- Nappy Roots
- DJ Haul & Mason
- Tim Walsh's Lasers

=== 2003 ===
The 2003 Voodoo Music + Arts Experience was held from October 31 to November 1, 2003.

Official lineup:
- The White Stripes
- Iggy Pop
- Marilyn Manson
- 50 Cent
- A Perfect Circle
- Paul Oakenfold
- Questlove
- Ludacris
- Godsmack
- Cowboy Mouth
- Better Than Ezra
- Queens of the Stone Age
- Staind
- Galactic
- Mindless Self Indulgence
- The String Cheese Incident
- Z-trip
- Fuel
- Marc Broussard
- Howie Day
- The Roots
- P.O.D
- 12 Stones
- Adema
- Supagroup
- The Subdudes
- Rabbit in the Moon
- Kill Hannah
- X
- Disco Biscuits
- The Donnas
- Revis
- Felix Da Housecat
- Mos Def
- Blackalicious
- Karl Denson
- Gov't Mule
- Cypress Hill
- Smile Empty Soul
- Rusted Root
- Galactic
- Bad Boy Bill
- DJ Dan
- RJD2
- Robert Randolph and the family

=== 2004 ===
The 2004 Voodoo Music + Arts Experience was held October 29–31, 2004.

Official lineup:
- Beastie Boys
- Green Day
- Pixies
- Sonic Youth
- Kid Rock
- Velvet Revolver
- Cypress Hill
- The Killers
- De La Soul
- Talib Kweli
- The Polyphonic Spree
- A Tribe Called Quest
- Alter Bridge
- Ambulance LTD
- Catch Velvet
- Cowboy Mouth
- DJ Logic
- DJ Medi4
- DJ P
- Dropping Daylight
- Eisley
- Fall as Well
- Ferry Corsten
- Funk Fast Forward
- Ghost
- Gogol Bordello
- Gomez
- Gooding
- The Hanks
- John Digweed
- Joseph Arthur
- Juliette & The Licks
- KillRadio
- Lake Trout
- LTJ Bukem
- Mauro Picotto
- Metric
- Mix Master Mike
- Morning 40 Federation
- New Found Glory
- Northern State
- O-Fresh
- Particle
- Paul Van Dyk
- Phantom Planet
- Rock City Morgue
- Shinedown
- Slunt
- Snow Patrol
- Steel Pulse
- Sugarcult
- Supagroup
- Theresa Anderson
- Pleasure Club
- The Thrills
- Wylde Bunch

=== 2005 ===
The 2005 Voodoo Music + Arts Experience was held October 29–30, 2005 in New Orleans and Memphis.

Official lineup:
- Nine Inch Nails
- Queens of the Stone Age
- North Mississippi Allstars
- The Bravery
- New York Dolls
- Cowboy Mouth
- World Leader Pretend
- The Secret Machines
- Death From Above 1979
- The Decemberists
- Samurai Deli
- Tiësto
- Carl Cox
- Cake
- Digable Planets
- Better Than Ezra
- Supagroup
- HIM
- Dan Dyer
- Mindless Self Indulgence
- Ghost
- Kermit Ruffins
- Jon Cleary
- Bonerama
- Big Sam's Funky Nation
- Morning 40 Federation
- Theresa Andersson
- C. C. Adcock
- Jose Conde
- Brotherhood of Groove
- Ballzack
- Rebirth Brass Band
- Fi Yi Yi – Spirits of the Mandingo Warrior
- FreeSol
- The Compromise
- On a Dead Machine
- Will Hoge
- Augustine
- Of Autumn
- King Wilkie
- The Giraffes
- Negative Poles
- Mrs. Fletcher
- Nag Hammadi
- Noomoon Tribe

=== 2006 ===
The 2006 Voodoo Music + Arts Experience was held October 28–29, 2006.

Official lineup:
- Red Hot Chili Peppers
- Duran Duran
- The Meters
- Kings of Leon
- The Flaming Lips
- Wu Tang Clan
- Social Distortion
- My Chemical Romance
- Shooter Jennings
- Drive-By Truckers
- The Secret Machines
- Broken Social Scene
- Blue October
- Brazilian Girls
- Ferry Corsten
- Kinky
- Jamie Lidell
- The Living Things
- Joseph Arthur
- Otra
- Mutemath
- Fatter Than Albert
- Jose Conde y Ola fresca
- Ellipsis
- Soul Rebels
- Terra Diablo
- Trombone Shorty
- Imagination Movers
- Ballzack
- Amanda Shaw
- NOOMOON Tribe
- Worms Union
- Nag Hammadi
- Pain Tribe
- Zydepunks
- Spoonfed Tribe
- Ray Bong & Mad Mike
- Six Foot Shallow
- Ozomatli
- Yerba Buena
- Jack's Mannequin
- The Rentals
- The Fiery Furnaces
- The Whigs
- Cowboy Mouth
- Kermit Ruffins
- Morning 40 Federation
- Big Sam's Funky Nation
- Hot 8 Brass Band
- Jon Cleary
- Sam & Ruby
- Dan Dyer
- NOOMOON Tribe
- Worms Union
- Nag Hammadi
- Pain Tribe
- F.I.S.T.
- DJ Jinx
- Ratty Scurvics
- The Eyelash Carpets

=== 2007 ===
The 2007 Voodoo Music + Arts Experience was held October 26–28, 2007.

Official lineup:
- Rage Against The Machine
- Kings Of Leon
- The Smashing Pumpkins
- Wilco
- Dr. John
- Fall Out Boy
- Tiesto
- M.I.A.
- The Black Crowes
- Common
- Plain White T's
- Ben Harper and the Innocent Criminals
- Marc Broussard
- Paolo Nutini
- Gym Class Heroes
- Toots & the Maytals
- Black Rebel Motorcycle Club
- Jason Isbell
- Galactic featuring Chali 2na (of Jurassic 5)
- Porcupine Tree
- JJ Grey & MOFRO
- Dax Riggs
- Earl Greyhound
- Lez Zeppelin
- Soul Rebels Brass Band
- Sinéad O'Connor
- Clap Your Hands Say Yeah
- Red Jumpsuit Apparatus
- Ska Cubano
- Zap Mama
- Quintron and Miss Pussycat
- New Orleans Social Club
- Spoon
- Preservation Hall Jazz Band
- Ghostland Observatory
- Toubab Krewe
- Motion City Soundtrack
- Mutemath
- Kermit Ruffins and the Barbeque Swingers
- The New Orleans Bingo! Show
- Dexateens
- Ivan Neville's Dumpstaphunk
- Donald Harrison plus the Congo Nation
- Bonerama
- CC Adcock and Lil' Band O' Gold
- Hot 8 Brass Band
- Theresa Andersson
- Dan Dyer
- Ghost
- Zydepunks
- Jose Conde y Ola Fresca
- Meriwether
- Vavavoom
- Fatter Than Albert
- Amy Cook
- DJ Tom Harvey
- Eyelash Carpets
- Noisician Coalition/Noise Parade
- LUX
- Hands of Nero
- The Mad Mike Experience
- Heavenly Trip To Hell
- Palanquin Diaries
- Slew Foot
- Tchoupchupacabra
- Gravity A
- EllisD & Ray Bong
- Circa Survive
- Coheed & Cambria
- Big Sam's Funky Nation
- Fleur De Tease
- Rotary Downs
- Porter-Batiste-Stoltz
- Rockie Charles
- Sam & Ruby
- Panorama Jazz Band
- The Happy Talk Band
- Henry Butler
- Jamie McLean Band
- Dave Gregg and the Barefoot Philistines
- Ratty Scurvics Singularity
- NOOMOON Tribe
- Chant w/Curse Mackey
- (AN)drew Madinc.
- Sista Otis
- My Graveyard Jaw
- Widetrack
- Why Are We Building Such A Big Ship?
- Brass Bed
- DJ Slice
- DJ Proppa Bear
- Pain Tribe
- Gokh-Bi System
- Morning 40 Federation
- Liquidrone
- Cute Is What We Aim For
- The New Orleans Bingo! Show
- Mighty Clouds Of Joy
- Jon Cleary and the Absolute Monster Gentlemen
- Trombone Shorty and Orleans Ave
- The Furious?
- Ballerinas
- Amanda Shaw and the Cute Guys
- Christian Scott, Deacon John
- Groove Sect
- Good Guys
- Crooked
- Illusion Fields
- LOID
- Nag Hammadi
- Sirena Serpentina
- Trevor Green
- The Syndrome
- TheTransmission
- Sinister Trailer Park
- WORMS UNION
- Noisician Coalition
- Snuff Sugar, Aurora Aerial

=== 2008 ===
The 2008 Voodoo Music + Arts Experience was held October 24–26, 2008.

Official lineup:
- Nine Inch Nails
- R.E.M.
- Stone Temple Pilots
- Thievery Corporation
- TV on the Radio
- Lil Wayne
- Lupe Fiasco
- Panic At the Disco
- Wyclef Jean
- Ghostland Observatory
- Old 97's
- Joss Stone
- Angels and Airwaves
- The Mars Volta
- Dashboard Confessional
- Butthole Surfers
- Sharon Jones & The Dap-Kings
- Cold War Kids
- Ozomatli Reunited w/ Chali 2na
- Erykah Badu
- Reverend Horton Heat
- The Gutter Twins
- Man Man
- DeVotchKa
- The New Orleans Bingo! Show
- Extra Action Marching Band
- Cowboy Mouth
- Irma Thomas
- Ivan Neville's Dumpstaphunk
- Bonerama
- Fishbone
- Lucky Brown
- Manchester Orchestra
- Innerpartysystem
- Tokyo Police Club
- Trombone Shorty and Orleans Avenue
- Walter Wolfman Washington
- Marc Broussard
- The New Orleans Bingo! Show
- Norcio
- Grace Potter and the Nocturnals
- The Dirtbombs
- The Iguanas
- New Orleans Jazz Orchestra
- Marva Wright and the BMW's
- The Zydepunks
- Rockie Charles
- Ben Jelen
- Leo Nocentelli
- Hot 8 Brass Band
- Dead Confederate
- Dan Dyer
- Dr. Michael White
- Treme Brass Band
- Clint Maedgen +9
- Rotary Downs
- John Boutté
- Sam & Ruby
- Preservation Hall Jazz Band
- Shamarr Allen
- Fleur de Tease
- Fatter Than Albert
- The Happy Talk Band
- The Knux
- Ashes Divide
- 101 Runners
- Joseph Arthur & The Lonely Astronauts
- The Dynamites featuring Charles Walker and Big Sam's Funky Nation
- Big Sam's Funky Nation
- King Britt Tribute to Sister Gertrude
- New Orleans Jazz Vipers
- Big Blue Marble
- Sons of William
- Washboard Chaz Blues Trio
- DJ Tom Harvey
- Voodoo Social Aid A Pleasure Club presents DJ Soul Sista's Annual Downtown Throwdown
- DJ Butterfoot
- Nag Hammadi
- Ray Bong
- White Bitch's Prey Drive
- Tap Water Mind Control
- Worms Union
- My Graveyard Jaw
- Pain Tribe
- Blind Boys of Alabama
- The Morning 40 Federation
- Deacon John’s Tribute to New Orleans R&B
- Wardell Quezerque
- Dirty Dozen Brass Band
- New Orleans Sunken City Circus
- Shellshock
- Andre Williams
- Oscillation Communications
- One Man Machine
- Gravity A
- CHANT
- (AN)drew Madinc
- Common Thread
- Mad Mike
- The LowDown ThrowDown
- The Wall Street Traitors
- The Bad Off
- Hurray for the Riff Raff
- Wooded Teeth
- F.I.S.T.
- Voodoo Social Aid A Pleasure Club presents DJ Soul Sista's Annual Downtown Throwdown
- DJ Butterfoot
- C-Ba$ Sideshow
- Nag Hammadi
- Big Al Carson
- Paul Sanchez and The Rolling Road Show
- Widetrack
- Noomoon Tribe
- DJ Proppa Bear
- Good Guys
- Ratty Scurvics Singularity
- DJ Soul Sister
- CyberTrybe
- Dave Gregg & the Barefoot Philistines
- DJ Slice
- Crooked
- Worlds Most Dangerous
- American Disaster Party
- Deep in the Ninth
- Under the Green
- F.I.S.T.
- Blind Boys of Alabama
- The Morning 40 Federation
- Deacon John’s Tribute to New Orleans R&B
- Wardell Quezerque
- Dirty Dozen Brass Band
- Preservation Hall Jazz Band
- Soul Rebels Brass Band
- Eli "Paperboy" Reed and the True Loves
- Quintron and Miss Pussycat
- Hot Club of New Orleans
- Tin Men with the Valparaiso Men's Chorus
- The Vettes
- Bones
- The Lee Boys
- Melody Clouds
- Voodoo Social Aid A Pleasure Club presents DJ Soul Sista's Annual Downtown Throwdown
- DJ Butterfoot
- C-Ba$ Sideshow
- Sista Otis
- Sirena Serpentina
- Hands of Nero
- Illusion Fields
- Crimes Against Nature
- Paul Varisco and The Milestones
- Valpraiso Men's Chorus
- Manwitch
- Rock N' Soul

=== 2009 ===
The 2009 Voodoo Music + Arts Experience was held from October 30 to November 1, 2009.

Official lineup:
- Eminem / D12
- Kiss
- Jane's Addiction
- Lenny Kravitz
- The Black Keys
- Justice
- The Flaming Lips
- Silversun Pickups
- Widespread Panic
- Drive-By Truckers
- Gogol Bordello
- Wolfmother
- Ween
- Janelle Monae
- Jello Biafra and the Guantanamo School of Medicine
- Robert Randolph & the Family Band
- All Time Low
- Black Lips
- The Cool Kids
- Squirrel Nut Zippers
- Meat Puppets
- JJ Grey and MOFRO
- Eric Church
- Shooter Jennings
- Mutemath
- Mates of State
- George Clinton and Parliament-Funkadelic
- K'naan
- American Bang
- Down
- Brand New
- The Pogues
- Generationals
- Erick Baker
- Glasgow
- The Knux
- Mynameisjohnmichael
- Alejandro Escovedo
- Benjy Davis Project
- Ledisi
- Papa Grows Funk
- DJ Soul Siser
- Little Freddie King
- Preservation Hall-Stars w/ Special Guest
- Tao Rodriguez-Seeger Band
- Lil' Brian and Zydeco Travelers
- TBC Brass Band
- Loose Marbles
- Fischerspooner
- New Orleans Bingo! Show
- The Happy Talk Band
- MarchFourth Marching Band
- Why Are We Building Such A Big Ship?
- Luke Winslow-King
- Bones
- Ratty Scurvics
- From Legends To Nancy
- As Tall As Lions
- DJ Soul Sister
- Walter Wolfman Washington and the Roadmaster w/ Dirty Dozen horns
- Big Sam's Funky Nation
- New Orleans Klezmer All Stars
- Irvin Mayfield
- Leroy Jones
- Dan Dyer
- Mas Mamones
- Sam & Ruby
- Sarah Quintana
- Andrew Duhon And The Lonesome Crows
- Fatter Than Albert
- Nicholas Megalis
- Morning 40 Federation
- Rotary Downs
- New Orleans Bingo! Show
- Zydepunks
- White Bitch
- Brother Taisuke's Mass Choir
- Davis Rogan
- Earl Greyhound
- DJ Soul Sister
- Rebirth Brass Band
- Trombone Shorty And Orleans Ave All Stars
- Cyril Neville's Blues Revue With Tab Benoit, Monk Boudreaux, and Johnny Sansone
- BeauSoleil
- John Mooney and Bluesiana
- Amanda Shaw
- Leo Jackson And The Melody Clouds
- Katey Red & DJ Papa, Big Freedia, Sissy Nobby
- Quintron and Miss Pussycat
- Fleur De Tease
- Suplecs
- Michael Tolcher
- The Vettes
- Justin Jones and the Driving Rain
- Lucy's Walk
- R. Scully Rough 7
- MC Trachiotomy

Artists and art installations

- Mark Griffin "Ladder"
- Deirdre Sargent "Picnic Table Project"
- Eyetrap/Benson Trent "Illusion"
- Elliott Coon "Watch Your Eye", "Parlor"
- Hans Sachs
- Manuel Kretzer "Cone v2"
- Molly Gochman "Welcome"
- Mathias Gmachl
- Rachel Wingfield "Pavilion of the Four Winds"
- Jen Lewin "Light Harp"
- Generic Art Solutions "O.K."
- Daphane Park "Hammock Mother"
- Stefan Beese "Passage"
- Munz "Hot Shot The Robot"
- Andrew Slaughter
- Jeff Matson
- Thaddeus Zarse
- Joseph Keppel
- Mantis
- Mini Man
- TungstenMonkey Collective
- Tora Lopez
- Emiliano Maggi
- Mickey Sumner
- John Oles
- William Murphy
- Kristian P. Hansen
- Lisa Lozano

=== 2010 ===
The 2010 Voodoo Music + Arts Experience was held October 29–31, 2010.

Official lineup:
- Ozzy Osbourne
- Muse
- My Morning Jacket
- Drake
- Weezer
- Deadmau5
- Florence + The Machine
- Interpol
- MGMT
- Metric
- Hot Chip
- Paul van Dyk
- Street Sweeper Social Club
- Paul Oakenfold
- Jakob Dylan and Three Legs
- Ferry Corsten
- Rusko
- Buckwheat Zydeco
- Major Lazer
- Raphael Saadiq
- Eagles of Death Metal
- Cage the Elephant
- Minus the Bear
- A-Trak
- Janelle Monáe
- Fitz & The Tantrums
- Swiss Chriss (band)
- Christoph Andersson
- Eli "Paperboy" Reed
- Galactic with Guests
- The Airborne Toxic Event
- Jónsi
- Innerpartysystem
- Afrojack
- Die Antwoord
- Curren$y
- Trombone Shorty & Orleans Avenue
- Rebirth Brass Band
- Paul Wall
- Crookers
- Boys Noize
- Preservation Hall Jazz Band
- Stanton Moore Trio with Anders Osborne and Robert Walter
- Voice of the Wetland All Stars feat., Tab Benoit, Cyril Neville, Waylon Thibodeaux, Monk Bourdeaux, Johnny Vidacovich, Johnny Sansone
- Soul Rebels Brass Band
- Theresa Andersson
- Basin Street Records Revue feat., Kermit Ruffins, Dr. Michael White, Jeremy Davenport, George Porter Jr. & Runnin' Pardners
- Toubab Krewe
- Jon Cleary and the Absolute Monster Gentlemen
- Treme Brass Band with Uncle Lionel Batiste
- Cedric Burnside & Lightnin Malcolm
- Big Sam's Funky Nation
- The New Orleans Bingo! Show
- The Happy Talk Band
- Fleur De Tease Burlesque Revue
- Rotary Downs
- Paul Sanchez & the Rolling Road Show
- DJ Soul Sister
- Quintron & Miss Pussycat
- Honey Island Swamp Band
- Gal Holiday
- Rosie Ledet
- Fatter Than Albert
- Leo Jackson and the Melody Clouds
- AM
- Jonathan Tyler and the Northern Lights
- Shannon McNally
- Creole String Beans
- Feufollet
- Alvin Youngblood Hart
- Locos Por Juana
- Flow Tribe
- Consortium of Genius
- Luke Winslow-King
- Noisician Coalition
- DJ Quickie Mart
- The Vettes
- Debauche
- Helen Gillet
- The Local Skank
- COOT
- MC Sweet Tea
- Rival Sons
- Lost Bayou Ramblers
- O'Brother
- Kristin Diable

Artists and art installations

- Photonic Bliss "Galactivation Station"
- Dave Rhodes "Paper Airplane"
- Munz, d6, Intruder Alert "Hotshot the Robot/ hugo3"
- James Michalopoulos "Sparkie TouT Taux"
- Program12 & Susie Kim "The Vaudeville Theater"
- Thomas Rush "Swell Holding"
- Hans Sachs
- Manuel Kretzer "Cone v2"
- Munz "Hotshot Robot"
- Stefan Beese "Arachnid"
- Charles Lumar & Lauren Domino "SOUSAPHORESCENCE"
- Munz/ D6 "Robotronia"

=== 2011 ===
The 2011 Voodoo Music + Arts Experience was held October 28–30, 2011.

Official lineup:
- Soundgarden
- Blink 182
- The Raconteurs
- Snoop Dogg
- Girl Talk
- Steve Angello
- Fatboy Slim
- My Chemical Romance
- Cheap Trick
- Ray Davies
- Band of Horses
- TV on the Radio
- The Original Meters
- Social Distortion
- Mastodon
- X (band)
- Z Trip
- Major Lazer
- Ozomatli
- Odd Future
- Portugal. The Man
- Boots Electric
- City and Colour
- Civil Twilight
- Blind Pilot
- Mates of State
- Dr. John with special guests Irma Thomas, Cyril Neville, and Walter "Wolfman" Washington
- Fitz and the Tantrums
- American Legacies with the Preservation Hall Jazz Band and the Del McCoury Band
- Peelander-Z
- The Sheep Dogs
- Gordon Gano of Violent Femmes with Lost Bayou Ramblers
- A-Trak
- The Wombats
- The Static Jacks
- Kreayshawn
- The Limousines
- Fishbone
- The Stone Foxes
- Givers
- Ani DiFranco with Ivan Neville & Herlin Riley
- Honey Island Swamp Band
- Johnny Sketch and the Dirty Notes
- Mannie Fresh
- Dirty South +King Britt
- Red Baraat
- Members of Morphine with Jeremy Lyons
- Jackmaster
- Claude VonStroke
- Maya Jane Coles
- The Bangerz
- The Revivalists
- Daedelus
- Quickie Mart & Tony Skratchere
- Mike Relm
- MyNameIsJohnMichael
- BeauSoleil with Dr. Michael White
- Mississippi Rail Company
- Feur De Bris with special guest Dan Dyer
- Star Eyes
- Fort Knox Five
- Dangermuffin
- The Soul Rebels Brass Band w/ Cyril Neville
- Deniz Kurtal
- Craig Richards
- Danny Howells
- Lee Burridge
- Force Feed Radio
- Bobby Rush
- Ivan Neville’s Dumpstaphunk with special guests Walter "Wolfman" Washington, Angelo Moore
- Treme Brass Band
- Tommy Malone and the Hard Head
- New Orleans Bingo! Show
- The Travelin’ McCourys with Keller Williams
- Bonerama feat. Dave Malone of The Radiators
- Fleur De Tease
- Leo Jackson and the Melody Clouds
- Glen David Andrews
- New Orleans Klezmer Allstars
- Ma Maison with the Trey McIntyre Project/Preservation Hall Jazz Band
- King James and the Special Men
- Tanner Ross with Voices of Black
- Wolf + Lamb
- Soul Clap
- Natalie Mae and Her Unturned Tricks
- Lynn Drury Band
- High Ground Drifters Bluegrass Band
- Kora Konnection feat. Morikeba Kouyate and Thierno Dioubate
- Ernie Vincent and the Top Notes
- Achachay!
- Cheeky Blakk
- Quintron and Miss Pussycat
- The Vettes
- Noisician Coalition, Electronic Sound Line with the Bull and the Bot
- Carmine P. Filthy
- Andrew Duhon
- Iris May Tango
- Kyle Turley
- Palmetto Bug Stompers
- Tao Seeger Brass Band
- Chris Thomas King
- Illuminasti Trio Plus 1 feat. Mike Dillon, James Singleton, Skerik, and Brian Coogan
- Morning 40 Federation
- R. Scully’s Rough 7
- Hurray for the Riff Raff
- Happy Talk Band
- Rotary Downs
- New Orleans Bounce Azztravaganza feat. Katey Red, Vockah Redu, Cheeky Blakk, D.J. Lefty Parker, and special guests
- Christoph Andersson
- Swiss Chriss
- Fran Moran and The Nervous Wrecks
- DJ Swamp
- Miracle at St. Anna

Artists and art installations

- Richie Jordan "Fountain De Lis"
- Emilie Lejeune, Mike Landry and Matt Decotiis "Ephemeral Ambiance"
- Hans Sachs
- Manuel Kretzer "Cone v2"
- "Live Mural Wall"
- James Michalopoulos "Sparkie TouT Taux"
- Christian Ristow "Fledging"
- Doron Gazit "Color & Air"
- Jamin Murphy "Tensile"
- Jerry Therio "Tree of Words"
- Thom Rush "Swell Holding"
- Christian Van Heusen & Jerry Therio "Neon Garden"
- Buch Kanter "Mushroom Patch"
- Delaney McGuinness & Johnston Burkhard "Pinwheel Garden"
- Christiana Sporrong "Heron"

=== 2012 ===
The 2012 Voodoo Music + Arts Experience was held October 26–28, 2012.

Official lineup:
- Metallica (replaced Green Day due to frontman Billie Joe Armstrong's rant at the iHeartRadio Awards ceremony)
- Neil Young & Crazy Horse
- Jack White
- Skrillex
- The Avett Brothers
- Kaskade
- Justice
- Nas
- Silversun Pickups
- Awolnation
- Dave Stewart
- Gary Clark Jr.
- Bootsy Collins
- Etienne de Crécy
- K'Naan
- JFK of MSTRKRFT
- Tomahawk
- Thomas Dolby
- Say Anything
- Die Antwoord
- Modestep
- Toots and the Maytals
- Preservation Hall Jazz Band
- The Gaslamp Killer
- Borgore
- Nervo
- The New Orleans Bingo! Show
- The Features
- Dev
- Delta Rae
- Soul Rebels
- George Porter Jr. and the Runnin' Pardners+ DJ QBert & D-Styles of the Invisibl Skratch Piklz
- DallasK
- Jim-E Stack
- Sister Sparrow and The Dirty Birds
- MyNameIsJohnMichael
- Infantree
- Lil Band O' Gold
- CC Adcock and The Lafayette Marquis
- The Revivalists
- Marcia Ball
- The Vettes
- Johnny Vidacovich, James Singleton and Henry Butler doing James Booker
- Ingrid Lucia presents New Orleans Nightingales plus Irma Thomas
- Anders Osborne w/ Johnny Sansone
- 101 Runners
- Big Chief Monk Boudreaux
- Treme Brass Band
- Force Feed Radio
- Lee Bains III & The Glory Fires
- Paul Sanchez Rolling Road Show w/ cast members of 9 Lives
- Little Freddie King
- Andy Suzuki and The Method (band)
- Dirty Dozen Brass Band
- Alvin Youngblood Hart
- Beverly Skillz
- Pimps of Joytime
- Star and Dagger +TBC Brass Band
- Tribute to Jimmy's Music Club (feat. The Models, Dash Rip Rock, Sexdog, & Stephie and The Whitesox)
- Supagroup
- Noisician Coalition
- Big Al Carson
- Luke Winslow King
- Lost Bayou Ramblers with Preservation Hall Horns
- Leo Jackson and The Melody Clouds
- Royal Teeth
- Carmine P. Filthy
- Unicorn Fukr
- Rekanize
- Big History
- Christopher Joseph
- Christoph Andersson
- Fleur de Tease with Special Guests Debauche
- Chicano Batman
- St. Cecilia's Asylum Chorus
- Mainline (band)
- Money Mitch

Artists and art installations

- Christina Sporrong and Christian Ristow "Sliver Claw"
- Program12 & Susie Kim "The Vaudeville Theater"
- Delaney McGuinness & Johnston Burkhard "Pinwheel Garden"
- RE:BE Art Department "Artist Bar"
- Christian Ristow "Face Forward"
- Marcus Brown "Way"
- Dave Rhodes "Doors of Perception"
- Andrew Graham "Movement"
- Hans Sachs
- Manuel Kretzer "Cone v2"

=== 2013 ===
The 2013 Voodoo Music + Arts Experience was held from November 1–3, 2013.

Official lineup:
- The Cure
- Nine Inch Nails
- Pearl Jam
- Kid Rock
- Calvin Harris
- Bassnectar
- Paramore
- Macklemore & Ryan Lewis
- Afrojack
- Boys Noize
- The Gaslight Anthem
- Big Gigantic
- Matt & Kim
- Alkaline Trio
- Preservation Hall Jazz Band
- Dirty South
- Desaparecidos
- Beats Antique
- New Found Glory
- Cults
- Savoy
- Delta Rae
- Anamanaguchi
- Maxim of The Prodigy
- Moon Taxi
- Allen Stone
- Destructo
- Youndblood Hawke
- ZZ Ward
- Rudimental +The Revivalists
- Shovels & Ropes
- The Olms
- Keys N Krates
- L.P.
- G-Eazy
- F. Stokes
- He's My Brother She's My Sister
- Hockey
- A Silent Film
- Robert Delong
- The Weeks
- The Virginmarys
- The Apache Relay
- Those Darlins
- Reignwolf
- CC Adcock & The Lafayette Marquis
- Ruby Amanfu
- Fleur DeBris
- Billy Squier
- Bad Things
- John Michael Rouchell
- Flow Tribe
- Mystery Skulls
- Royal Teeth
- Quintron & Miss Pussycat
- Roll The Tanks
- Jingle Punks Hipster Orchestra
- Dan Dyer
- The Purrs
- Andrew Duhon
- Turf War
- The Black Cadillacs
- The Brenton Sound
- Poof! The Pop Show With Carmine P. Filthy & A Boy Named Ruth
- Big History
- Coyotes
- Kinky Machine
- Leopold and His Fiction
- Church with Unicorn Fukr, Mr. Cool Bad Guy & Guests
- Leslie Blackshear Smith & Double Black Featuring Simon Lott, DJ Raymond, Shawn Theriot, Alfred "Uganda" Roberts, Tim Green, Ivan Neville, Kiki Phillips, Mehnaz Hoosein & Erica Falls
- Sports & Leisure
- Paul Varisco and The Milestones
- Panic in Eden
- Oh, Jeremiah
- Hello Negro
- J Fernell
- The Real Night Tripper: Dr. John Featuring George Porter Jr., Herlin Riley, Alfred "Uganda" Roberts, Smokey Johnson, Chief Monk Bourdeaux, Nicholas Payton, Roderick Paulin, Sarah Morrow, & Topsy Chapman & Solid Harmony

=== 2014 ===
The 2014 Voodoo Music + Arts Experience was held from October 31 to November 2, 2014.

Official lineup:
- Foo Fighters
- Outkast
- Skrillex
- Arctic Monkeys
- Zedd
- Pretty Lights
- All Dat
- Thirty Seconds To Mars
- Slayer
- Awolnation
- Rise Against
- Flux Pavilion
- Fedde Le Grand
- Gogol Bordello
- Death From Above 1979
- City And Colour
- Claude VonStroke
- Manchester Orchestra
- Galantis
- Booka Shade
- DJ Set
- Pete Tong
- Twenty One Pilots
- Thomas Gold
- Action Bronson
- Trombone Shorty & Orleans Avenue
- Melvins
- Bleachers
- GRiZ
- Congorock
- Fishbone
- MAKJ
- Fuel
- Herobust
- Le Youth
- Big Freedia
- Givers
- Rebirth Brass Band
- Red Baraat
- Barcelona
- Thomas Newson
- The Wild Feathers
- Wild Cub
- Drew Holcomb and the Neighbors
- Royal Teeth
- Bonerama
- Soul Rebels Brass Band
- Barely Alive
- Trent Cantrelle
- Manic Focus
- World/Inferno Friendship Society
- The London Souls
- Peelander-Z
- Lindsay Lowend
- Astr
- Flow Tribe
- The Tontons
- Honey Island Swamp Band
- Sturgill Simpson
- Benjamin Booker
- Desert Noises
- Dirty Bourbon River Show
- Bo Ningen
- Tysson
- Quintron and Miss Pussycat
- Yung Nation
- SPEAK
- Hello Negro
- Carmine P. Filthy and a Boy Named Ruth
- Church with Unicorn Fukr & Innerlign
- Veridia
- Naughty Professor
- Crass Mammoth
- Luxley
- St. Cecilia's Asylum Chorus and the MarchFourth Marching Band

=== 2015 ===
The 2015 Voodoo Music + Arts Experience was held from October 30 to November 1, 2015.

Official lineup:

Friday

- Florence + The Machine
- Jack Ü
- Modest Mouse
- Alesso
- Girl Talk
- All Day
- Jason Isbell
- Gerard Way
- Yelawolf
- Destructo
- Joey Bada$$ and the Soul Rebels
- The Joy Formidable
- Ryan Bingham
- Jauz
- Frank Turner & the Sleeping Souls
- Salva
- Jessica Hernandez & the Deltas
- Wax Motif
- Hundred Waters
- Grizfolk
- Flow Tribe
- Dan Dyer
- Hello Negro
- St. Cecilia's Asylum Chorus
- Bloodstache

Saturday

- Ozzy Osbourne featuring Geezer Butler, Tom Morello and Slash
- Jane's Addiction
- Santigold
- Duke Dumont
- Giorgio Moroder
- Clutch
- Zhu
- Django Django
- Lettuce
- The Growlers
- Babes in Toyland
- Jacob Plant
- Terence Blanchard featuring The E-Collective
- Nina Las Vegas
- Fantastic Negrito
- Joywave
- The Struts
- The Suffers
- The Wans
- Veridia
- Mike Dillon's Punk Rock Percussion Consortium
- Mississippi Rail Company
- Carmine P. Filthy & A Boy Named Ruth
- Kompression with Unicorn Fukr and Herb Christopher

Sunday

- Zac Brown Band
- Deadmau5
- Chance The Rapper
- Eric Prydz
- Slightly Stoopid
- Third Eye Blind
- The Cult (The Cult cancelled)
- Tchami
- Bro Safari
- Fishbone
- Title Fight
- Dumpstaphunk
- Elliphant
- Mija
- The Temperance Movement
- Here Come the Mummies
- July Talk
- Rozzi Crane
- Quickie Mart
- Tysson
- Baby Bee
- The Ludlow Thieves
- Babygirl

=== 2016 ===
The 2016 Voodoo Music + Arts Experience was held October 28–30, 2016. During their Sunday headlining set, Arcade Fire recorded the audience singing a melody for an unreleased song for its upcoming album, which later became "Everything Now".

Official lineup:

Friday

- The Weeknd
- G-Eazy
- Porter Robinson
- Rae Sremmurd
- Carnage
- Foals
- Tory Lanez
- Mayer Hawthorne
- What So Not
- Slander
- Wild Belle
- Chairlift
- Lost Kings
- NF
- Bear Hands
- Lunice
- Cheat Codes
- Seratones
- Sonny Alven
- The Breton Sound
- Babygirl
- Active Bird Community

Saturday

- Tool
- Cage The Elephant
- Die Antwoord
- Rebelution
- Excision
- Ghost
- The Claypool Lennon Delirium
- Alison Wonderland
- DJ Mustard
- Melanie Martinez
- Shakey Graves
- Snakehips
- Bully
- Nothing But Thieves
- Oh Wonder
- Saint Motel
- The Pretty Wreckless
- Black Tiger Sex Machine
- All Them Witches
- Léon
- Cakes Da Killa
- Sexual Thunder
- Carmine P. Filthy
- Kidd Love

Sunday

- Arcade Fire
- The Chainsmokers
- Band of Horses
- Gramatik
- STS9
- Puscifer
- Beats Antique
- Snails
- Anderson. Paak & The Free Nationals
- Preservation Hall Jazz Band
- Bob Moses
- Morning 40 Federation
- Party Favor
- Lookas
- 4B
- Sir The Baptist
- The Eagle Rock Gospel Singers
- The Shelters
- Little Scream
- Unicorn Fukr
- Herb Christopher

=== 2017 ===
The 2017 Voodoo Music + Arts Experience was held October 27–29, 2017.

Official lineup:

Friday

- Kendrick Lamar
- LCD Soundsystem
- Galantis
- Kehlani
- Prophets of Rage
- Yellow Claw
- The Afghan Whigs
- Andrew McMahon in the Wilderness
- Marian Hill
- Nghtmare
- Gnash
- Bibi Bourelly
- Benjamin Booker
- Chicano Batman
- Autograf
- Joyride
- Flow Tribe
- Mondo Cozmo
- Tokimonsta
- Saint Jhn
- Durand Jones & the Indications
- Public Access TV
- DJ Mel
- Alfred Banks
- Free Swim

Saturday

- Foo Fighters
- DJ Snake
- Brand New
- RL Grime
- Crystal Castles
- Superduperkyle
- Live
- K Flay
- Illenium
- Whitney
- The Black Angels
- Vintage Trouble
- Hayley Kiyoko
- Rich Chigga
- The Record Company
- Colony House
- Boombox Cartel
- Pell
- CID
- Black Pistol Fire
- Flint Eastwood
- Tim Gunter
- DJ Gracie
- Carmine P Filthy
- Otto

Sunday

- The Killers
- Dillon Francis
- The Head & The Heart
- Post Malone
- Miguel
- Cold War Kids
- Louis the Child
- The James Hunter Six
- Amine
- G Jones
- Mija
- Strand of Oaks
- Snbrn
- Sam Dew
- Pham
- La Femme
- Ron Gallo
- Mannequin Pussy
- Bleached
- Malik Ninety Five
- Unicorn Fukr
- Herb Christopher
- SKB & Yrstrly
- Werd2jah
- Zander

=== 2018 ===
The 2018 Voodoo Music + Arts Experience was held October 26–28, 2018.

Official lineup:

Friday

- Mumford & Sons
- A Perfect Circle
- The Revivalists
- Zeds Dead
- Third Eye Blind
- Rüfüs Du Sol
- Rainbow Kitten Surprise
- Gryffin
- Goldlink
- Elle King
- Kayzo
- Ravyn Lenae
- Albert Hammond Jr.
- Shiba San
- Claptone
- White Reaper
- Dorothy
- Mt. Joy
- Caamp
- Brother Sundance
- GG Magree
- Young Bombs
- Swaylo
- Unicorn Fukr

Saturday

- Travis Scott
- Odesza
- Martin Garrix
- Marilyn Manson
- Janelle Monae
- Ty Dolla $ign
- Highly Suspect
- Hippe Sabotage
- Tom Misch
- Lizzo
- Sofi Tukker
- Big Thief
- Frenship
- Wallows
- Anna Lunoe
- Nora En Pure
- Droeloe
- Starcrawler
- The Coronas
- Loudpvck
- Motel Radio
- Cray
- Jack Harlow
- Carmine P Filthy

Sunday

- Arctic Monkeys
- Modest Mouse
- 21 Savage
- Tipper
- Judah & The Lion
- AJR
- TroyBoi
- Lettuce
- Tinashe
- Boogie T. Rio
- Poppy
- The Suffers
- Space Jesus
- Sunflower Bean
- Clozee
- Eprom
- Thunderpussy
- The O'My's
- Dirtwire
- Otto

=== 2019 ===
The 2019 Voodoo Music + Arts Experience was held October 25–27, 2019.

Official lineup:

Friday

- Guns N' Roses
- Brandi Carlile
- Interpol
- Big Gigantic
- Bishop Briggs
- Snails
- Moon Taxi
- Hobo Johnson & The Lovemakers
- Bea Miller
- Peakaboo
- Still Woozy
- Dr. Fresch
- Grandson
- Cray
- Ducky
- Magic City Hippies
- Njomza
- Memba
- Templo
- Liily
- Des Rocs
- DJ Nice Rack

Saturday

- Beck
- Bassnectar
- The National
- Zhu
- Young the Giant
- Clairo
- The Glitch Mob
- Jai Wolf
- Denzel Curry
- Japanese Breakfast
- Elohim
- Pink Sweat$
- Medasin
- Shaed
- Whipped Cream
- Flamingosis
- Brutus
- Seratones
- Mattiel
- Iglooghost
- Hello Yello
- Sun Seeker
- Paz
- Carmine P Filthy

Sunday

- Post Malone
- Rezz
- Bring Me the Horizon
- Sheck Wes
- Hippo Campus
- Big Wild
- Opiuo
- Missio
- Danileigh
- Temples
- K?D
- Ashe
- The Ghost of Paul Revere
- Phantoms
- Duncan Fellows
- Willaris. K
- Mobley
- Maggie Lindemann
- Tristan Dufrene

=== 2022 ===
On June 10, 2022, festival organizers confirmed in an announcement on social media and the festival’s website that the event won't happen this year, calling it a “pause.”

== See also ==
- List of historic rock festivals
