= This Time Around =

This Time Around may refer to:

== Music ==
=== Albums ===
- This Time Around (Hanson album) or the title song (see below), 2000
- This Time Around (Heather Williams album) or the title song, 2011
- This Time Around (Otis Clay album) or the title song, 1998
- This Time Around (Paul Brandt album) or the title song, 2004
- This Time Around: Live in Tokyo, by Deep Purple, or the title song (see below), 2001
- This Time Around (EP), by Tedashii, or the title song, 2016
- This Time Around (Green on Red album), 1989
- This Time Around, by Phats & Small, or the title song, 2001

=== Songs ===
- "This Time Around" (Hanson song), 2000
- "This Time Around" (Michael Jackson song), 1995
- "This Time Around", by Benjamin Orr from The Lace, 1986
- "This Time Around", by Brides of Destruction from Runaway Brides, 2005
- "This Time Around", by Cheap Trick from Standing on the Edge, 1985
- "This Time Around", by Jaira Burns from Burn Slow, 2018
- "This Time Around", by Jessica Pratt from Quiet Signs, 2019
- "This Time Around", by Tove Lo from Queen of the Clouds, 2014
- "This Time Around"/"Owed to 'G'", by Deep Purple from Come Taste the Band, 1975

== Other uses ==
- This Time Around (film), a 2003 American TV film
