= Benny Turner =

American blues musician (born 1939)

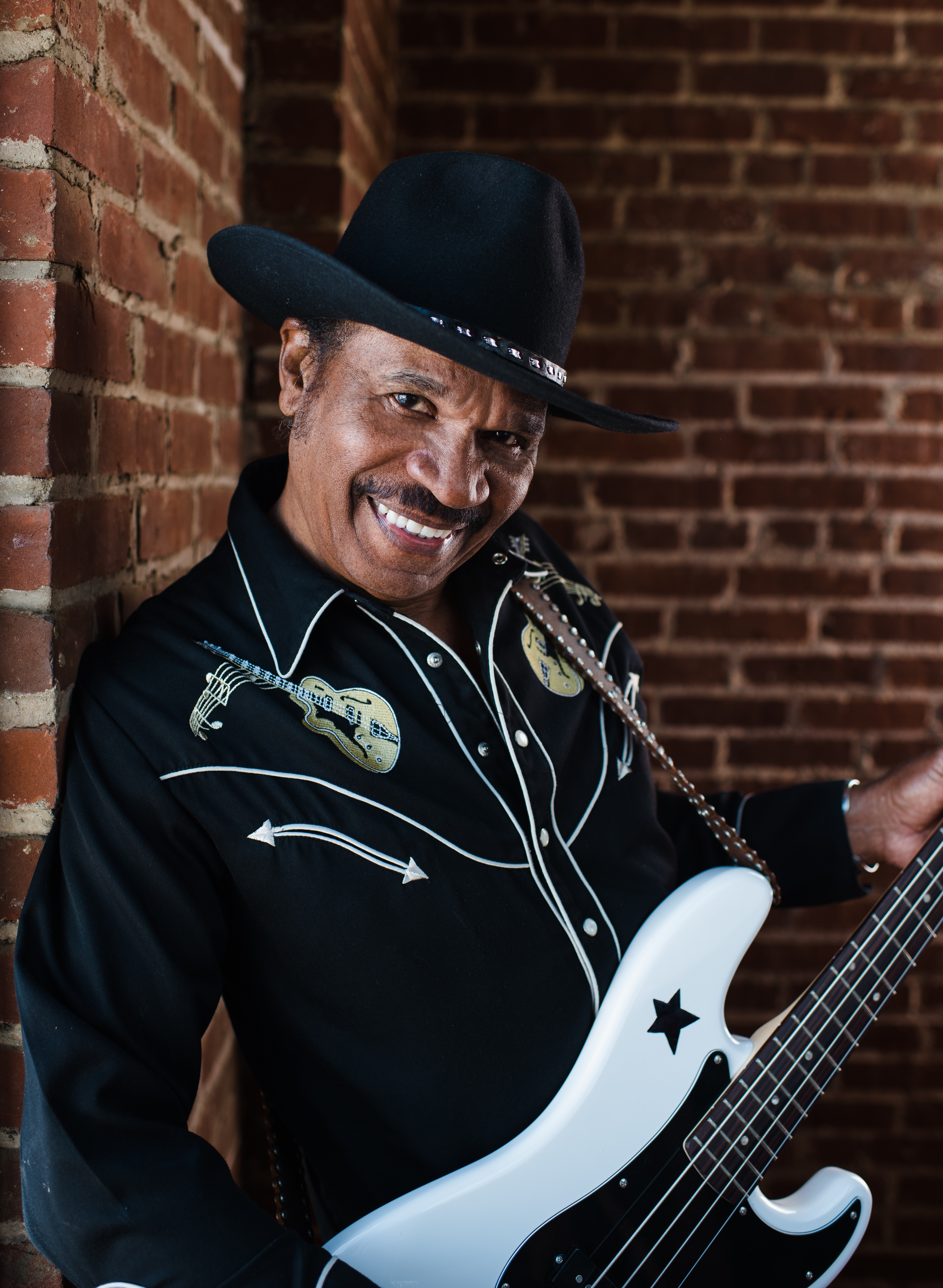

Background information
- Born: October 27, 1939 (age 86); Gilmer, Texas, United States
- Genres: Blues
- Occupation: Musician
- Labels: One-derful, Nola Blue, Inc.
- Website: www.bennyturner.com

Benny Turner (born October 27, 1939) is an American blues musician. He is the younger brother of Freddie King and was the bass guitarist for the Freddie King Band. Later, Turner joined Mighty Joe Young as the bass guitarist of his band before becoming the bandleader for Marva Wright for 20 years. After many years as a sideman, Turner started his solo career.

== Early years ==
Turner was born in Gilmer, Texas, on October 27, 1939. He and Freddie learned how to play guitar from their mother, Ella Mae (King) Turner, and her brothers Leon and Leonard King. In the 1950s, Turner moved to Chicago with his family.

== Career ==
Turner started his music career playing guitar for The Kindly Shepherds, a gospel group on the Nashboro Records label. He joined the group on several recordings, playing guitar and accompanying background vocals. At the time, Turner also started playing with his brother at Chicago clubs such as the Squeeze Club and Walton's Corner, where he met Dee Clark and was invited to join him and his R&B band on the road.

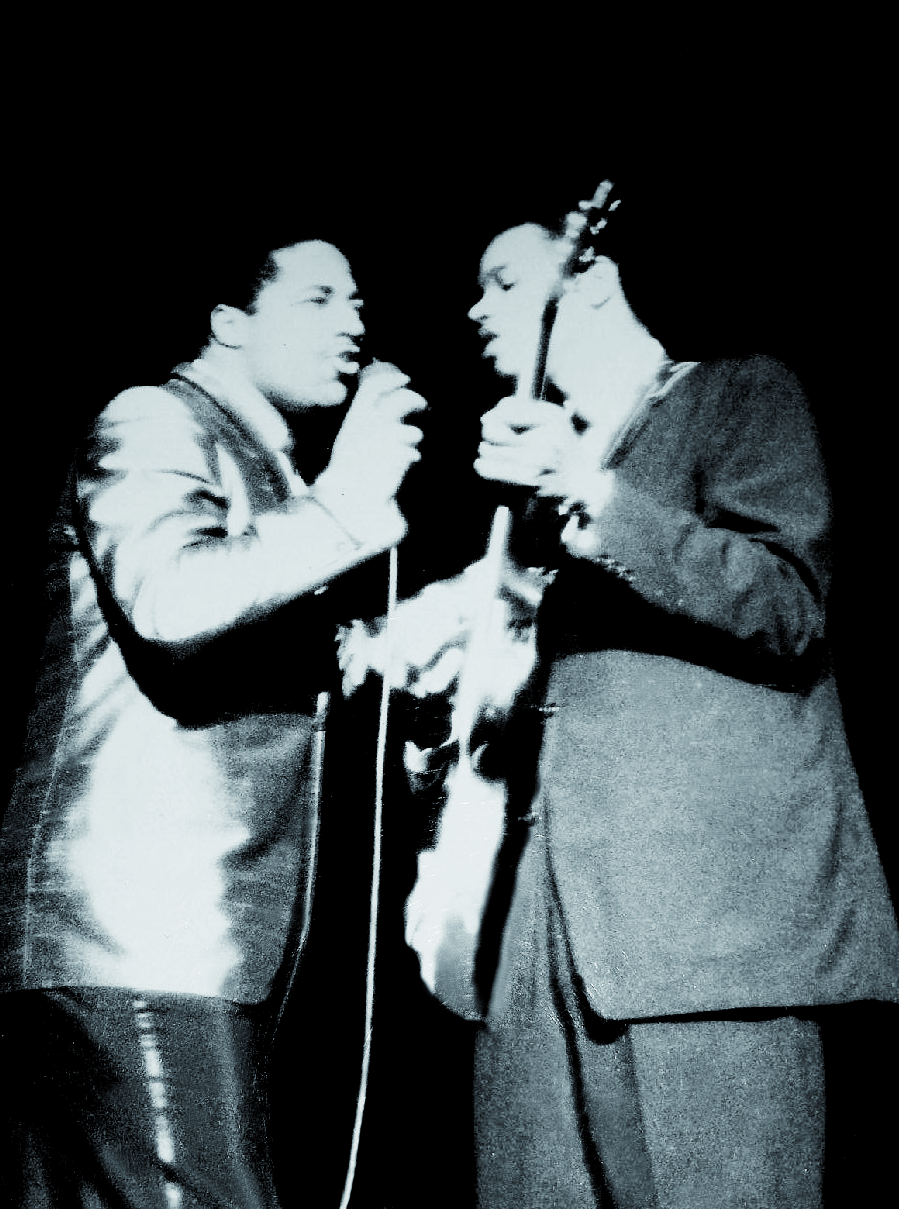
Benny and Dee Clark on stage at the Apollo Theater

Later, Turner would play bass for The Soul Stirrers. He eventually rejoined his brother's band and toured regularly, performing with musicians such as Eric Clapton, John Fogerty and Grand Funk Railroad. While at the Montreux Jazz Festival in 1973, members of Freddie's band were asked to sit in with Memphis Slim, and Turner played bass on the recording of Memphis Slim – Very Much Alive and in Montreux.

Following Freddie's death in 1976, Turner became deeply depressed and was hospitalized. After two years of seclusion, he was convinced to start performing again and joined Mighty Joe Young's band, which he played in for eight years. During that time, Turner and Young appeared in the 1981 film Thief while playing live at the Wise Fools Pub in Chicago. Later, Turner moved to New Orleans and became the bandleader for Marva Wright in 1986, playing with her band for 20 years.

After Wright's death in 2010, Turner went on to release four albums including his critically acclaimed 2014 album of original work called Journey. He also rejoined other members of the original Freddie King band for a brief tour celebrating King's 80th birthday. His 2016 album When She's Gone was dedicated to his mother Ella Mae and featured a collection of six original reissues from his album, Blue and Not So Blue, and four blues standards. His autobiography, Survivor: The Benny Turner Story, was published on July 8, 2017. Also in 2017, Turner released his latest album, My Brother's Blues. This award-winning album is a tribute to big brother Freddie King and features 11 tunes from Freddie's songbook that are of special significance to Benny. In 2019, Turner joined forces with longtime friend and fellow Chicago musician Cash McCall to record Going Back Home, revisiting their days of playing on Chicago's South and West Sides.

On October 27, 2019, Turner celebrated his 80th birthday at the Inaugural Lone Star Blues and Heritage Festival in Grapeland, Texas. Governor Greg Abbott of Texas officially recognized this milestone and Turner's many contributions to music and music history.

== Awards and accolades ==
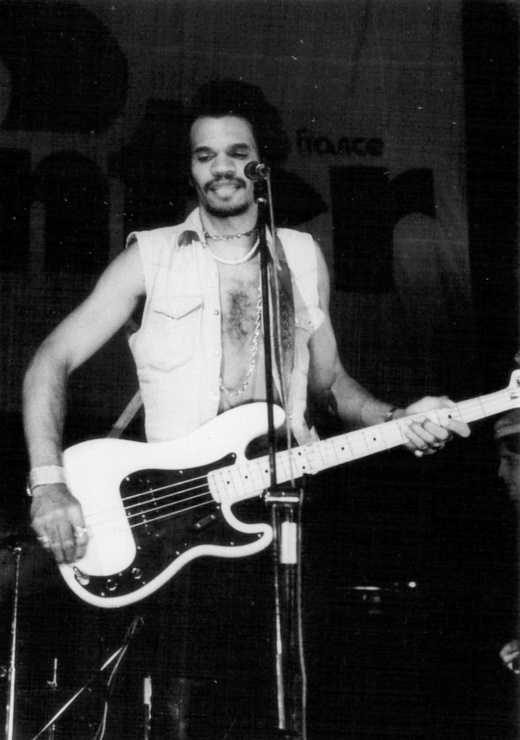
Benny Turner in 1975

- 2014 Offbeat Best of the Beat Awards - Nominee for Best Blues Album - Journey
- 2015 International Songwriting Competition - Finalist for Blues Song - Breakin' News
- 2016 Blues Blast Music Awards - Nominee for Soul Blues Album - When She's Gone
- 2016 Independent Blues Awards Awards - Nominee for Best Traditional Blues CD - When She's Gone
- 15th Independent Music Awards - Winner for Blues Song - I Can't Leave
- 16th Independent Music Awards - Nominee for Tribute CD - My Brother's Blues
- 17th Independent Music Awards - Nominee for Blues Album - Going Back Home
- 2018 Global Music Awards - Silver Medal for Outstanding Achievement - My Brother's Blues
- Turner received the 2017 Jus Blues Music Foundation "Little Milton Lifetime Bluesman Award"
- Turner was inducted into the Chicago Blues Hall of Fame in 2017
- October 27, 2017, was named "Benny Turner Day" in Gilmer, Texas, by proclamation of Mayor Tim Marshall
- Turner was a nominee in the 39th Blues Music Awards in the Instrumentalist-Bass category
- 2018 Blues Blast Music Awards - Nominee for Male Blues Artist of the Year and Soul Blues Album-My Brother's Blues
- 2018 Independent Blues Awards - Winner for Best Traditional Blues Band
- 2018 International Songwriting Competition - Finalist for Blues Song - What's Wrong With The World Today
- 25th Living Blues Awards, Critics' Poll - Winner for Most Outstanding Musician (Bass)
- 26th Living Blues Awards, Critics' Poll - Winner for Most Outstanding Musician (Bass)
- 2019 Blues Blast Music Awards - Nominee for Traditional Blues Album - Going Back Home
- 2019 Independent Blues Awards - Nominee for Best Traditional Blues CD - Going Back Home

== Discography ==
Album	Artist	Release date	Credit
Gives You a Bonanza of Instrumentals	Freddie King	1965	Bass
Very Much Alive and in Montreux	Memphis Slim	1973	Bass
Larger Than Life	Freddie King	1975	Bass
Freddie King (1934-1976)	Freddie King	1977	Bass
Takin' Care of Business	Freddie King	1985	Electric bass, bass
Live in Antibes, 1974	Freddie King	1988	Bass
Live at the Wise Fools Pub	Mighty Joe Young	1990	Guitar (bass)
The Blues Is...	Otis Clay	1991	Vocals, bass
The Gospel Truth	Otis Clay	1993	Guitar, background vocals, bass
When the Gates Swing Open	Otis Clay	1994	Guitar, background vocals, bass
Let the Good Times Roll	Freddie King	1994	Bass
Born with the Blues	Marva Wright	1996	Bass
Mighty Man	Mighty Joe Young	1997	Guitar (bass)
Blue and Not So Blue	Benny Turner	1997	Primary artist
Bluesiana Mama	Marva Wright	1999	Bass
Paris Mississippi Blues	Memphis Slim	2005	Bass
Do Right Woman: The Soul of New Orleans	Marva Wright	2006	Bass
After the Levees Broke	Marva Wright	2007	Producer, arranger, guitar (bass), background vocals
A Tribute to My Brother Freddie King	Benny Turner	2011	Primary artist
Journey	Benny Turner	2014	Primary artist
When She's Gone	Benny Turner	2016	Primary artist, producer, composer, bass, guitar, vocals
My Brother's Blues	Benny Turner	2017	Primary artist
Going Back Home	Benny Turner and Cash McCall	2019	Producer, primary artist, bass, guitar, vocals
