= Flow Tribe =

US musical group

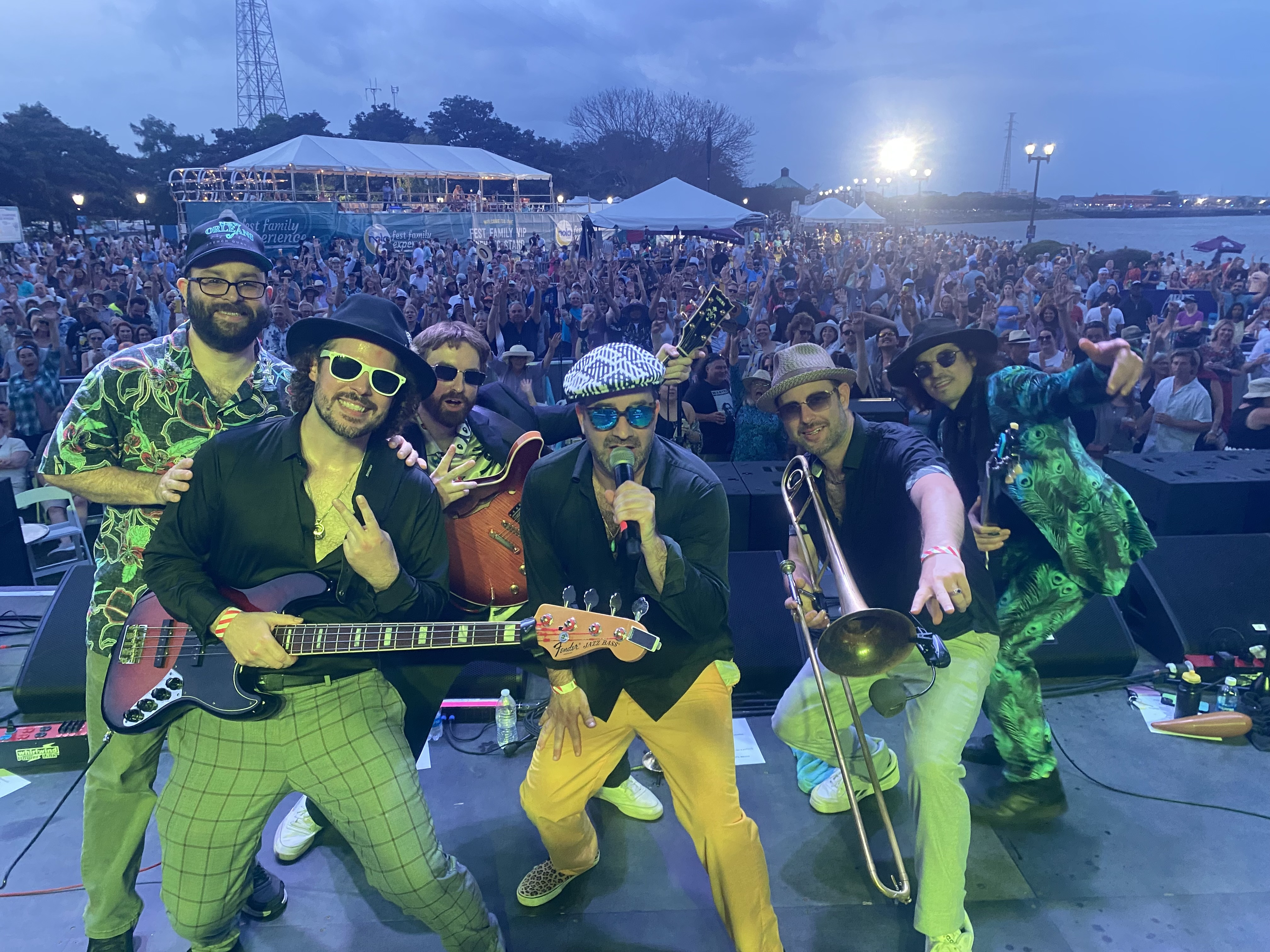
- Flow Tribe - French Quarter Fest 2026
- Members: K.C. O'Rorke; Scott Sibley; Kyle Chervanik; Evan Oberla; Bryan Santos
- Website: www.flowtribe.com

Flow Tribe is an American funk rock band based in New Orleans, Louisiana. The band was founded in 2004, and was featured on Episode 11 of MTV's The Real World: New Orleans (2010 season), which aired September 8, 2010. Sahar Dika, a member of The Real World: New Orleans cast, sang three songs with the band at a concert at Tipitina's.

Flow Tribe continues to be a festival staple in New Orleans playing the Voodoo Music Experience several times including the massive Main Stage, the New Orleans Jazz and Heritage Festival since 2010 including the Acura Main Stage, has been a headliner at French Quarter Festival since 2010, and performed many times at the Gretna Heritage Festival.

The band regularly tours nationally including playing many prominent festivals since 2010. Flow Tribe, known for their high energy live show brings their traveling street parade with them to every concert. Relix Magazine called Flow Tribe “bizarrely irresistible.”

Flow Tribe has collaborated with artists such as Allen Toussaint, Irma Thomas, Big Freedia, Mannie Fresh, Ivan Neville, and many others. The band celebrated their 20th anniversary in 2024.

== Formation ==
Flow Tribe formed in 2004 as a project between high school friends at local New Orleans high school Brother Martin High School. After graduation arrived the boys went their separate ways, and the musical project was shelved. Two years later Hurricane Katrina drew the members back to New Orleans to help rebuild, and in the midst of the destruction of the disaster the band was revived.

Eager to be ambassadors for a city that hadn't lost any ounce of its spirit during the flood, Flow Tribe re-tooled and hit the road, playing shows for music fans and displaced Katrina survivors throughout the Southeast. As their touring took them further and further away from Louisiana, they saw the love and appreciation that Americans had for the culture of New Orleans. They also learned that one of the most New Orleans-ish aspects of Flow Tribe's sound — the combination of different styles, sounds and genres into the same melting pot — appealed just as much to people who'd never visited the Big Easy. After all, Flow Tribe's genre-spanning "backbone-cracking music" had a little bit of something for everyone.

== Evolution ==
The release of BOSS in 2017, produced by legendary hip-hop hitmaker Mannie Fresh, earned Flow Tribe critical acclaim and a spot at #58 on Billboard’s R&B Chart. The experience of recording the album inspired the band to create their own studio, aiming to foster a creative hub for New Orleans' vibrant music scene.

Flow Tribe’s 2024 release, Garden of Earthly Delights, saw the band collaborate with Ivan Neville (Dumpstahphunk, Rolling Stones) on the lead single “Keep Pushing”. "Keep Pushing" delivers a powerful, infectious groove that commands attention from the first note. Ivan’s soulful vocals and exceptional organ performance elevate the track, infusing it with energy and depth.

== Current members ==
- K.C. O'Rorke – vocals, trumpet
- Scott Sibley – drums
- Kyle Chervanik – bass, vocals
- Evan Oberla – trombone, keys, vocals
- Bryan Santos – guitar

== Discography ==
- Garden of Earthly Delights (2024)
- Loteria Cosmica (2020)
- Boss (2017)
- Alligator White (2014)
- At Capacity Live: Live at Tipitina's (2013)
- Pain Killer (2012)
- Pregnant With A Baby Called Funk (2008)
