= Wolf at the Door =

Wolf at the Door may refer to:

- Wolf at the Door (album), a 1991 album by Walter "Wolfman" Washington
- A Wolf at the Door (film), a 2013 Brazilian film
- The Wolf at the Door, a 1986 Danish-French film
- The Wolf at the Door: A Poetic Cycle, a book by Bogomil Ǵuzel
- "A Wolf at the Door", a song by Radiohead from Hail to the Thief
- "Wolf at the Door", a song by Keane
