= Heather Williams (singer) =

American singer-songwriter

- Birth name: Heather Lynn Holder
- Born: February 3, 1976 (age 49); Dearborn, Michigan, U.S.
- Genres: Contemporary Christian music
- Occupation: Singer-songwriter
- Instrument(s): Vocals, guitar
- Years active: 2007–2012
- Labels: Fair Trade Services
- Website: www.heatherwilliamsmusic.com

Heather Lynn Williams (born February 3, 1976 née Holder) is an American singer-songwriter born and raised in Dearborn, Michigan. In 2011 Williams released the album entitled This Time Around, her first full-length studio album that was with the record label Fair Trade Services.

== Background ==
Williams was raised in a poor, abusive home by her step-father and birth mother until she was 11, when her mother gave her away. Williams married Timothy Blair Williams in August 1995 in Stuart, Florida, and the couple's eldest son died at the age of six months. However, Williams subsequently gave birth to four healthy boys.

== Discography ==
=== Albums ===
Year	Album details	Peak chart positions
Year	Album details	US Christian
2011	This Time Around: Released: September 27, 2011; Label: Fair Trade Services; Format: CD, digital download	—

=== Singles ===
Year	Title	Chart peaks				Album
Year	Title	US Christian	US Christian AC	US Christian AC Ind	US Christian Soft/AC	Album
2010–11	"Hallelujah"	18	12	17	4	This Time Around
2011–12	"God Is Still God"	25	21	18	7	This Time Around
2012	"You Are Loved"	40	—	—	—	This Time Around
