= Johnny Sansone =

American singer (born 1957)

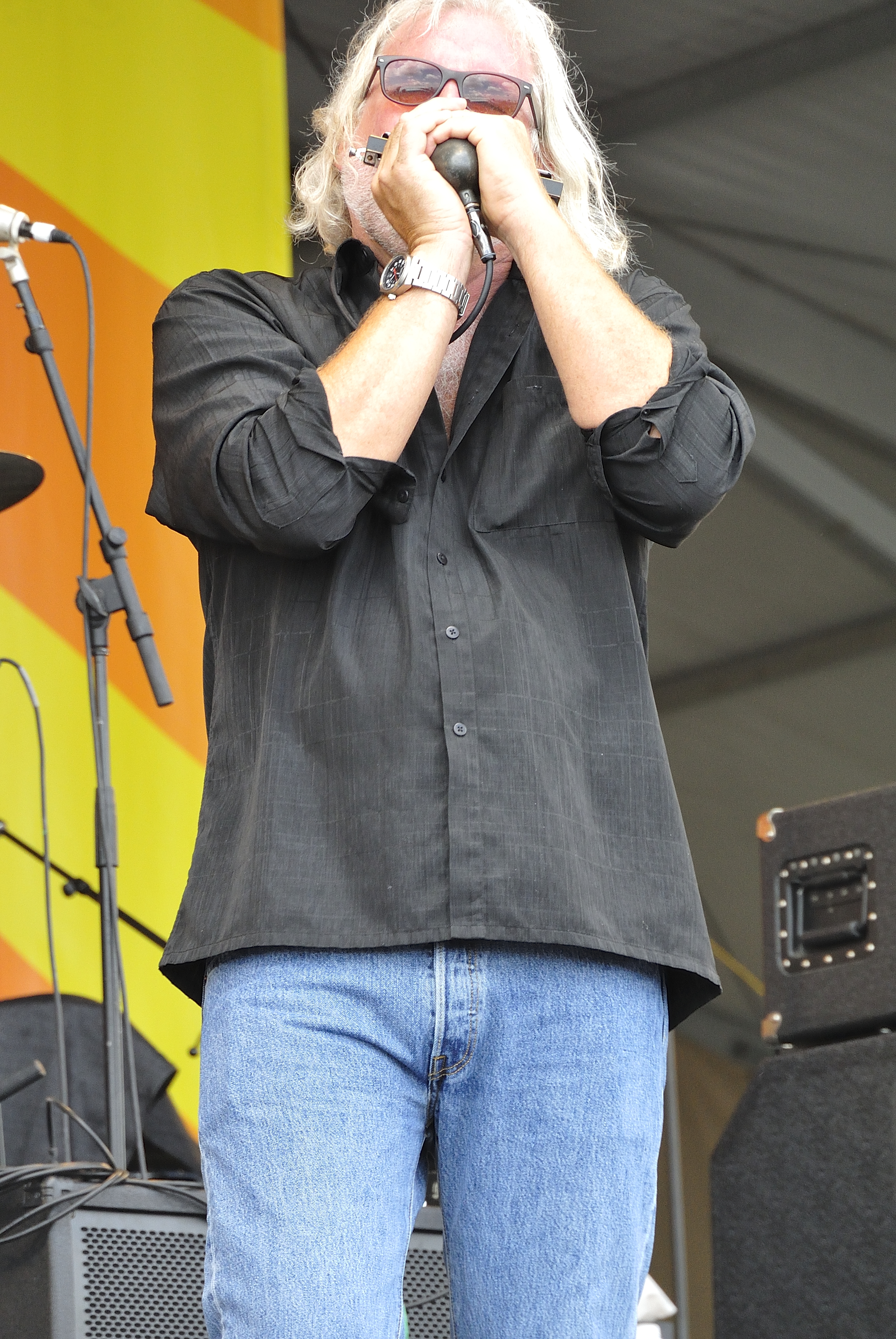
- Sansone at the 2012 New Orleans Jazz & Heritage Festival

Background information
- Also known as: Jumpin' Johnny Sansone
- Born: John Sansone; September 27, 1957 (age 68); Orange, New Jersey, U.S.
- Genres: Electric blues
- Occupations: Singer, songwriter, harmonicist, accordionist
- Instruments: Harmonica, accordion, guitar, piano, vocals
- Years active: 1980s–present
- Label: Various
- Website: johnnysansone.com

John Sansone (born September 27, 1957), also known as Jumpin' Johnny Sansone, is an American electric blues singer, songwriter, harmonicist, accordionist, guitarist and piano player. He was nominated for seven music awards in 2012, including a Blues Music Award which he won. To date, he has been involved in the release of twelve original albums.

== Early life and education ==
Born in Orange, New Jersey, Sansone was raised in nearby West Orange, and attended West Orange High School, where he took up swimming.

His father had played the saxophone in Dave Brubeck's band during World War II, and by the time he was age 12, his son had learned to play the saxophone, guitar and harmonica and seen Howlin' Wolf in concert. He later studied blues harmonica playing by studying both Junior Wells and James Cotton. He left New Jersey in 1975 on a swimming scholarship at a college in Colorado.

== Career ==
Sansone toured in the 1980s supporting Robert Lockwood, Jr., David "Honeyboy" Edwards and Jimmy Rogers.

Sansone moved between Colorado, Austin, Texas, Florida, Chicago, and Chapel Hill, North Carolina, before settling in 1990 in New Orleans, which has been his home base ever since. His original touring band, known as Jumpin' Johnny & the Blues Party, recorded their debut album, Where Y'at in 1987, which was released by the independent record label, Kingsnake Records, based in Sanford, Florida. Mr. Good Thing (1991) followed, before Sansone got inspired to try his hand at playing the accordion after attending the funeral of Clifton Chenier.

By the second half of the 1990s, Sansone had embraced Cajun, Southern soul, Chicago and Delta blues into his style and songwriting. The resultant recording, Crescent City Moon (1997), was mainly his own work; although it included a cover version of Ted Hawkins' "Sweet Baby", which featured Sonny Landreth playing slide guitar. The collection included liner notes from Greg "Fingers" Taylor. It received widespread critical approval and several awards, including scooping several Offbeat magazine's 'Best of the Beat' accolades. Rounder Records subsidiary label, Bullseye Blues, issued Waternelon Patch (1999), which saw guest appearances by Jon Cleary (piano) and Joe Krown (organ).

Sansone lost momentum in the early 2000s, although he continued to perform in various musical ensembles, as well as working during the week in construction. He started to play in a trio with Joe Krown and John Fohl. They played traditional blues with Krown on piano, and Fohl and Sansone sharing the vocal duties. This trio Sansone, Krown & Fohl released a self-titled album from Sansone's label ShortStack Records in 2004.

In 2005, Sansone joined the Voice of the Wetlands Allstars (which variously incorporated Dr. John, Cyril Neville, Monk Boudreaux, Johnny Vidacovich, Anders Osborne, George Porter Jr., Waylon Thibodeaux, and Tab Benoit), who were interested in promoting local environmental issues. The band became a regular feature at the New Orleans Jazz and Heritage Festival. Having to vacate his home in the legacy of Hurricane Katrina, Sansone continued to tour and perform with the Voice of the Wetlands Allstars, wherein he befriended Anders Osborne. Poor Man's Paradise (2007) was Sansone's first solo album for eight years and was produced by Osborne who also played clavinet and slide guitar on two of the tracks. Joe Krown also contributed on the electric organ. In 2009, Sansone played the accordion on Mike Zito's album, Pearl River.

By then playing in another acoustic trio setting, this time with Osborne and Fohl, Sansone was inspired to write the track, "The Lord Is Waiting and The Devil Is Too". It turned in to the title track of his 2011 album, and won the 'Song of the Year' title at the 2012 Blues Music Awards. It provided a release from the stresses of a marital break-up, and the record's producer Osborn pushed Sansone's music towards a more commercial, rock influenced, direction. In October 2012, Sansone performed at the Voodoo Experience in New Orleans, and in December that year, Sansone appeared at the inaugural Bradenton Blues Festival.

After a couple of live album releases, Sansone's next studio based creation was Once It Gets Started (2013). Sansone then gave "one of the best individual performances of the 2014 New Orleans Jazz & Heritage Festival," according to Offbeat magazine.

A later issue, Lady on the Levee (2015), was another Osborne production and included a guest appearance from Monk Boudreaux.

== Influences ==
Sansone's major influence was his fellow blues musician and songwriter, Jimmy Reed.

== Discography ==
=== Albums ===
Year	Title	Record label	Credited to
1987	Where Y'at	Kingsnake Records	Jumpin' Johnny & the Blues Party
1991	Mr. Good Thing	Kingsnake Records	Jumpin' Johnny & the Blues Party
1997	Crescent City Moon	Rounder Records	Jumpin' Johnny Sansone
1999	Watermelon Patch	Rounder Records	Johnny Sansone
2004	Sansone, Krown & Fohl	ShortStack Records	Sansone, Krown & Fohl
2007	Poor Man's Paradise	CD Baby	Johnny Sansone
2011	The Lord Is Waiting and The Devil Is Too	ShortStack Records	Johnny Sansone
2011	Live at Jazz Fest 2011	Homegrown Distribution	Jumpin' Johnny Sansone
2012	Live at JazzFest 2012	MunckMix	Jumpin' Johnny Sansone
2013	Once It Gets Started	ShortStack Records	Johnny Sansone
2015	Lady on the Levee	ShortStack Records	Johnny Sansone
2018	Hopeland	ShortStack Records	Johnny Sansone
2022	Into Your Blues	ShortStack Records	Johnny Sansone

== See also ==
- List of electric blues musicians
- List of harmonicists
