= Funk Is in the House =

Studio album by Walter "Wolfman" Washington
- Released: 1998
- Genre: Funk, blues
- Label: Bullseye Blues
- Producer: Scott Billington

Walter "Wolfman" Washington chronology
Sada (1991)	Funk Is in the House (1998)	On the Prowl (2000)

Funk Is in the House is an album by the American musician Walter "Wolfman" Washington, released in 1998. Washington is credited with his band, the Roadmasters. Washington supported the album with a North American tour.

== Production ==
The album was produced by Scott Billington. Washington was backed by a seven-member version of the Roadmasters, which included a three-piece horn section. "Mary Ann" is a cover of the Ray Charles song. "I Stand Accused" is a cover of the Jerry Butler song. "Close the Door" is a rendition of the song made famous by Teddy Pendergrass. "Wolf Funk" and "Funkyard" are instrumentals.

== Critical reception ==
Professional ratings
Review scores
Source	Rating
AllMusic	3/5 stars

The Times-Picayune wrote that "Washington grins, croons and howls like a soul man while dispensing sleek guitar lines alongside the horn-and-bass-driven Roadmasters." The Daily Herald determined that "the milky 'Please Come Back to Me' and 'Close the Door' are deeply felt and joyful ... [the] horn arrangements here always surprise, especially on 'I'm in Love', a pretty and whirling ballad laced in flutes." The Independent concluded that the album "finds the supremely tasteful guitar player on strong form on a stew of gospel and soul-drenched ballads and dance tunes." The Portland Press Herald called the music "classic horns-&-organ R&B, colored by jazz, soul and a lot of funk."

The Washington Post deemed the title track "a ceaseless party chant powered by funk guitar chords, drummer Wilbert Arnold's sly syncopations and saxophonist Larry Carter's keening alto." OffBeat noted that "Washington's liquid solos—which embrace the jazzy lines of Charlie Christian with the percussive bite of Johnny Guitar Watson—always seem to find hidden nooks woven throughout the Roadmasters backdrop, especially on the instrumental workouts." The Vero Beach Press Journal considered "I Stand Accused" to be "a soul vocal tour-de-force."

== Track listing ==
No.	Title	Length
1.	"Trials and Tribulations"
2.	"Funkyard"
3.	"I Stand Accused"
4.	"Mary Ann"
5.	"Please Come Back to Me"
6.	"Wolf Funk"
7.	"When the Answer Is Clear"
8.	"Close the Door"
9.	"The Big Easy"
10.	"I'm in Love"
11.	"Funk Is in the House"
12.	"Cousin Joe"
