= Walter "Wolfman" Washington =

American singer and guitarist (1943–2022)

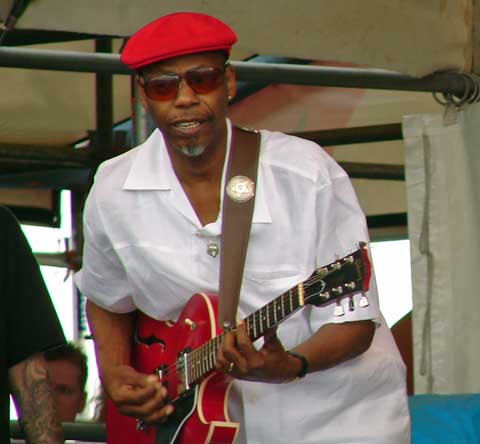
- Washington at the New Orleans Jazz & Heritage Festival, 2008

Background information
- Birth name: Walter Washington
- Born: December 20, 1943; New Orleans, Louisiana, U.S.
- Died: December 22, 2022 (aged 79); New Orleans, Louisiana, U.S.
- Genres: Blues
- Occupation(s): Musician, singer
- Instrument(s): Guitar, vocals
- Years active: 1962–2022
- Labels: Hep' Me, Maison de Soul, Rounder, Pointblank, Bullseye Blues, Zoho Roots
- Website: WalterWolfmanWashington.com

Walter "Wolfman" Washington (December 20, 1943 – December 22, 2022) was an American singer and guitarist, based in New Orleans, Louisiana, United States. While his roots were in blues music, he blended in the essence of funk and R&B to create his own unique sound.

== Biography ==
Washington was born in New Orleans, and whilst still in his teens, he was invited to play in Lee Dorsey's band.

In the mid-1960s, Washington formed the All Fools Band, and played at clubs in New Orleans.

In the 1970s, he joined Johnny Adams' band. He played with Adams for 20 years, performing both live and on his records. During this time he continued to work as a solo artist, and in the late 1970s formed his own band, the Roadmasters, and toured Europe with them.

Washington released his first solo album, Rainin' In My Life, in 1981 on the small local label Hep' Me. He landed a contract with Rounder Records in 1985, and he released three albums with that label. After the Rounder days, he also released an album, Sada, on Pointblank Records.

Washington started to play regularly with two New Orleans musicians, the organist Joe Krown and the drummer Russell Batiste, Jr., working as a trio at the Maple Leaf Bar.

Washington appears in performance footage in the 2005 documentary film Make It Funky!, which presents a history of New Orleans music and its influence on rhythm and blues, rock and roll, funk and jazz. In the film, he performs "Barefootin'" with the house band.

In 2008, he released Doin' the Funky Thing, his first album in many years. Live at the Maple Leaf, a live recording by Krown, Washington, and Batiste was also released in the same year.

Washington died of cancer in New Orleans, on December 22, 2022, two days after his 79th birthday.

== Awards and honors ==
=== OffBeat's Best of The Beat Awards ===
Year	Category	Work nominated	Result	Ref.
1995	Best Blues Band or Performer		Won	
1995	Best Urban Contemporary R&B Band or Performer		Won	
1997	Best R&B/Soul Band or Performer		Won	
1998	Best Funk Album	Funk is in the House	Won	
1998	Best R&B/Soul Band or Performer		Won	
2000	Best Blues Band or Performer (with The Roadmasters)		Won	
2000	Best Blues Album	On the Prowl	Won	
2003	Best Guitarist		Won	
2006	Best Blues Band or Performer (with The Roadmasters)		Won	
2009	Best R&B/Funk Album	Live at the Maple Leaf (with Joe Krown and Russel Batiste, Jr.)	Won	
2015	Best Blues Band or Performer		Won	
2015	Best Guitarist		Won	
2016	Best Blues Band or Performer		Won	
2018	Lifetime Achievement in Music		Won	
2018	Album of the Year	My Future is My Past	Won	
2018	Best Blues Album	My Future is My Past	Won	

== Discography ==
- 1981 Leader Of The Pack (Hep' Me)
- 1986 Wolf Tracks (Rounder)
- 1987 Rainin' In My Life (Maison de Soul)
- 1988 Out of the Dark (Rounder)
- 1991 Wolf at the Door (Rounder)
- 1991 Sada (Pointblank)
- 1998 Funk Is in the House (Bullseye Blues)
- 1999 Blue Moon Risin' (Artelier)
- 2000 On the Prowl (Rounder)
- 2008 Doin' the Funky Thing (Zoho Roots)
- 2014 Howlin' LIVE at DBA New Orleans (Frenchmen Street Records)
- 2018 My Future Is My Past (ANTI-Records)
