= This Time Around (Otis Clay album) =

Studio album by Otis Clay
- Released: 1998
- Genre: Soul
- Label: Bullseye Blues
- Producer: Willie Mitchell

Otis Clay chronology
Hi Masters (1998)	This Time Around (1998)	The Complete Otis Clay on Hi Records (2000)

This Time Around is an album by the American musician Otis Clay, released in 1998. It was his first studio album in five years, and came about due to a desire to record in Memphis again.

== Production ==
The album was produced by Willie Mitchell. The Memphis Horns and the Hi Rhythm Section contributed to the album; Cash McCall and Preston Shannon added guitar parts. Willie Hutch wrote "I Can Handle It" and "You're the One I Choose".

== Critical reception ==
Professional ratings
Review scores
Source	Rating
The Age	2.5/4 stars
AllMusic	4/5 stars
The Commercial Appeal	3.5/4 stars
The Encyclopedia of Popular Music	3/5 stars
Fort Worth Star-Telegram	3/5 stars
Los Angeles Daily News	2.5/4 stars
The Philadelphia Inquirer	3.5/4 stars
Pittsburgh Post-Gazette	3/4 stars

The Chicago Reader thought that "this is no exercise in nostalgia: swirling strings, horns so choppy and precise they almost sound synthesized, and a serpentine pop-funk melody line all proclaim it a decidedly contemporary soul-blues outing." The Washington Post determined that "Clay reaffirms his lofty place in soul music with a baritone voice that sounds more burnished and persuasive than ever." Esquire deemed it a "slick, hugely enjoyable comeback album."

The Age concluded that Clay "bristles with intensity on the caustic 'Standing in the Rain' and 'City in the Sky', but 'You're the One I Choose' and the easy-listening 'You Want Me To' detract from his natural soul power." The Independent noted that Willie Mitchell "has largely recreated the sound with which he helped Al Green to best Clay first time around." The Pittsburgh Post-Gazette opined that "the soulmeister is in fine and mellow form, testifying on breaking hearts, aching hearts and hearts on the mend." The Commercial Appeal argued that "Clay's has been a trustworthy, albeit sad-eyed, voice: the friend who breaks the bad news; the relative who sits you down for a heart to heart."

AllMusic wrote that "the backing musicians all have long pedigrees in Memphis soul music circles, either working at Stax or with producer Mitchell."

== Track listing ==
No.	Title	Writer(s)	Length
1.	"You're the One I Choose"	Willie Hutch	3:50
2.	"When Hearts Grow Cold"	Richard Smythe Kuebler, Tommy Tate	3:55
3.	"You Never Miss Your Water"	Morris Dollison	4:46
4.	"Somebody Help"	Tommy Tate	4:10
5.	"You Want Me to Do (What You Won't Do)"	Tommy Tate	3:29
6.	"Help Me Get Over You"	Archie Turner	4:00
7.	"Don't You Know Baby"	Walter Hatchett	3:40
8.	"That's How It Is"	Morris Dollison	3:40
9.	"This Time Around"	Thomas Bingham, Willie Mitchell	4:36
10.	"It's Hard to Love (After a Heartbreak)"	Willie Hutch	4:34
11.	"Standing in the Rain"	Thomas Bingham	4:29
12.	"City in the Sky"	Charles Chalmer	5:02
13.	"I Can Handle It"	Willie Hutch	3:58
