= I'll Treat You Right =

Studio album by Otis Clay
- Released: 1992
- Recorded: November 1991
- Studio: Studio Six, Memphis
- Genre: Blues, soul, R&B
- Label: Bullseye Blues
- Producer: Ron Levy

Otis Clay chronology
Watch Me Now (1989)	I'll Treat You Right (1992)	On My Way Home (1993)

I'll Treat You Right is an album by the American musician Otis Clay, released in 1992. It was recorded and released around the same time as labelmate Ann Peebles's Full Time Love, allowing the two to tour together. I'll Treat You Right peaked at No. 75 on Billboard's Top R&B Albums chart. Clay thought that Bullseye Blues could have done more to promote the album.

== Production ==
Produced by Ron Levy, the album was recorded in November 1991 at Studio Six, in Memphis. Levy used the Memphis Horns, guitar player Little Jimmy King, and Hi Records session musicians. Clay detested creating demos and insisted on singing with the full band on every song take. "Love Bone" was written by Teenie Hodges. "Leave Me and My Woman Alone" is based on a song by Little Milton. "Don't Burn the Bridge" is a version of the Albert King song.

== Critical reception ==
Professional ratings
Review scores
Source	Rating
All Music Guide to Soul	5/5 stars
The Encyclopedia of Popular Music	2/5 stars
MusicHound R&B: The Essential Album Guide	3.5/5 stars
The North County Blade-Citizen	4/5 stars

The Chicago Tribune called the album "a solid new set of Southern soul and blues." Rolling Stone concluded, "There's a tendency toward smoothed edges and sterility in the sound of the instruments... And [most of] the songs ... are simply ordinary. Anyone could have sung them." The Morning Call praised the "powerful, pliable, from-the-heart soul and gospel vocals".

The North County Blade-Citizen noted the "remarkable range of Clay's interpretive abilities." Robert Christgau listed "Thank a Lot" as a "choice cut". The Orlando Sentinel opined that I'll Treat You Right was among the best R&B albums of 1992.

== Track listing ==
No.	Title	Length
1.	"I Can Take You to Heaven Tonight"
2.	"Thanks a Lot"
3.	"Leave Me and My Woman Alone"
4.	"Love Bone"
5.	"Children Gone Astray"
6.	"Don't Burn the Bridge"
7.	"Back Away from It (Or Leave Me Alone)"
8.	"Gonna Take My Heart's Advice"
9.	"Believe That"
10.	"Hope You Love Me Like You Say You Do"
