= Mobley =

Mobley is a surname. Notable people with the surname include:

- Anne Ramsey (1929–1988), American actress born Anne Mobley
- Annie Mobley (born 1942), American politician
- Carlton Mobley (1906–1981), American jurist and politician
- Cuttino Mobley (born 1975), American former National Basketball Association player
- Eric Mobley (1970–2021), American basketball player
- Ethel Mobley (1914–1984), American race car driver, tied as the second female NASCAR driver
- Evan Mobley (born 2001), American basketball player
- Frank Mobley (1868–1956), English footballer
- Frank Harry Mobley (1870–1920), Canadian politician
- Hank Mobley (1930–1986), American hard bop and soul jazz tenor saxophonist and composer
- Isaiah Mobley (born 1999), American basketball player
- John Mobley (born 1973), American football player
- John Mobley Jr. (born 2005), American basketball player
- Kenice Mobley, American comedian
- Mary Ann Mobley (1937–2014), American actress and former Miss America
- Orson Mobley (born 1963), American former National Football League player
- Roger Mobley (born 1949), American child actor
- Russ Mobley (1933–2018), American educator and politician
- Sharif Mobley (born 1984), American suspected terrorist arrested in 2010
- Stephen Anthony Mobley (1965–2005), American convicted murderer
- Singor Mobley (born 1972), American former Canadian Football League linebacker
- Vic Mobley (born 1943), English former footballer
- Wendell Mobley, American country music songwriter
