= Wolf at the Door (album) =

Studio album by Walter "Wolfman" Washington
- Released: 1991
- Genre: Blues
- Label: Rounder
- Producer: Scott Billington

Walter "Wolfman" Washington chronology
Out of the Dark (1988)	Wolf at the Door (1991)	Sada (1991)

Wolf at the Door is an album by the American blues musician Walter "Wolfman" Washington, released in 1991. It was his third album for Rounder Records.

== Production ==
The album was produced by Scott Billington. It was recorded with Washington's Roadmasters band. "Hello Stranger" was written by Doc Pomus.

== Critical reception ==
Professional ratings
Review scores
Source	Rating
AllMusic	4/5 stars
Daily Herald	A−
The Encyclopedia of Popular Music	3/5 stars
MusicHound Blues: The Essential Album Guide	4/5 stars
The Rolling Stone Album Guide	4/5 stars

The Washington Post wrote that "Washington broadens the blues focus of his first two solo albums to include pop-jazz and Southern soul numbers ... he's singing better than ever and he plays guitar with a welcome new restraint." USA Today thought that "the venerable singer/guitarist and his ace Roadmasters are impressively flexible, brewing up le bon temps with jazz ('Peepin''), gospel ('It Doesn't Really Matter') and blues ('Tailspin')."

Living Blues called the album Washington's "most assured ever," writing that he sings "Hello Stranger" "with real expression, adding pithy guitar commentary that negates the triviality of synthesizer harmonies and George Bensonesque verbal shtick." The Journal of American Folklore deemed Washington "New Orleans' premier contemporary bluesman," writing that "his own haunting love ballad 'Don't Say Goodbye' is the most distinctive piece on the record." The State opined that "it's like Freddie King and Wes Montgomery got together in heaven."

AllMusic thought that "the horn arrangements look back toward 1960s Motown, and five of the six tracks fall squarely into the idiom of pre-disco R&B, with touches of funk and gospel." The Rolling Stone Album Guide called Wolf at the Door Washington's "strongest" album, writing that "the brass arrangements, in particular, are stunning."

== Track listing ==
No.	Title	Length
1.	"Hello Stranger"	6:11
2.	"Is It Something You've Got/I Had It All the Time"	5:31
3.	"I Want to Know"	4:50
4.	"Peepin'"	5:45
5.	"It Doesn't Really Matter"	6:02
6.	"Heatin' It Up"	4:24
7.	"Tailspin"	3:02
8.	"At Night in the City"	4:46
9.	"Don't Say Goodbye"	4:22

== Personnel ==
- Wilbert Arnold – drums
- Jack Cruz – bass
- David Ellington – piano
- Tom Fitzpatrick – saxophone
- George Jackson, Jr. – percussion
- Walter "Wolfman" Washington – guitar, vocals
