= This Time Around (Heather Williams album) =

Studio album by Heather Williams
- Released: September 27, 2011
- Recorded: 2010–2011
- Studio: "The Studio" (Franklin, Tennessee)
- Genre: Contemporary Christian music, soul, worship
- Length: 37:06
- Label: Fair Trade
- Producer: Chuck Butler, Jamie Moore

Singles from This Time Around
- 1. "Hallelujah" Released: 2010; 2. "God Is Still God" Released: 2011; 3. "You Are Loved" Released: 2012

This Time Around is the first studio album by contemporary Christian musician Heather Williams, released on September 27, 2011 by Fair Trade Services.

== Background ==
In the Christian Broadcasting Network interview with Kristi Watts, Williams said that her relationship with God began in 2004, when her son at six months' old died of a heart condition. In addition, Williams noted how the Bible said that we are as Christian's to live the life of Christ, and that we partake in his suffering. So, Williams' gave the suffering of her sons' death over to God, and she told that he worked it for her good. This allowed her to have a faith not like King Saul rather King David, which is not about ourselves, but one focused on God. Lastly, Williams' noted the more grace that we have received from God, means that we need to give and show more of it as well.

Heather Williams tells CCM Magazine's Caroline Lusk that the album process was akin to "'a birthing process...long and painful.'" Furthermore, Williams highlighted that "'Getting to work with Jamie Moore and Chuck Butler definitely grew me as an artist. I like to be challenged.'" Williams put the spotlight not on herself, but onto God, when she said "'I'm an ordinary girl who God saved...I don't want people to look to me...but to God. You don't have to be a musician, but give Him what you have. If we have Christ in our life and we've experienced that salvation we need to be sharing it.'"

== Composition ==
"Hallelujah"

The song was written from the prayer that Williams' wrote, where she wanted "Jesus please come, please come today," and this was within a year of her sons' death and while she was pregnant with her daughter.

"God Is Still God"

The song comes about because God is constant in our lives and he can bring us through anything if we would let him.

== Critical reception ==
Professional ratings
Review scores
Source	Rating
Alpha Omega News (Ken Wiegman)	B
Christianity Today (Kristin Garrett)	4/5 stars
Cross Rhythms (Simon Eden)	7/10 stars
Indie Vision Music (Jonathan Andre)	4/5 stars
Jesus Freak Hideout (Jen Rose)	3.5/5 stars
New Release Tuesday (Kevin Davis)	5/5 stars

Alpha Omega News' Ken Wiegman said that "My thoughts on "This Time Around" have changed as I have dug deeper into the 'who' of Heather Williams. As I read more, and learned of her struggles in life, I gained a greater appreciation for the lyrical content of the album." In addition, Wiegman affirmed that he "cannot understate the potential impact of Williams’ testimony and her ability to put it to words and music. It is a blessing that such a person would share their deepest emotions in such an expressive way."

Christianity Today's Kristin Garrett noted that "Coming from a background of significant struggle, she recognizes Christ's faithfulness with complete authenticity on her first full-length album. Themes of "praise through pain" come and go in the Christian music industry, but Williams' vocal personality makes this concept anything but trite. Her belted alto and alternative style resemble the power of artists like Kelly Clarkson, and the relatability [sic] of her lyrics make up for lack of poetic expression."

Cross Rhythms' Simon Eden wrote that Heather Williams comes "With a strong powerful voice, the songs are not exciting but are easily accessible adult pop."

Indie Vision Music's Jonathan Andre illustrated how that "This is an album that has taken me by surprise. Every song on the album is sung with such passion and honesty, with Heather wearing her heart on her sleeve. Opening up cannot be easy, and from the testimony, it can be seen that it was very hard for her to do so. Nevertheless, this album encourages, hopes, dreams, lives up to every expectation that one could have of it. This is an album that you shouldn’t just buy on a whim. This is a beautifully thought album with amazing lyrics and reflective tunes."

Jesus Freak Hideout's Jen Rose said that "At its best, This Time Around celebrates personal redemption in a fresh, powerful way and unveils her talent and passion. Though not a perfect record, it boasts a number of standout songs that set her apart in the CCM scene and reveals an artist with lots of future potential. For those looking for anthems of overcoming or something fun to chase the darker days away, this debut is worth checking out and establishes Heather Williams as an artist to watch."

New Release Tuesday's Kevin Davis wrote that "Heather Williams has the greatest voice I've heard this year, her vocals are so strong and pure. Musically and lyrically, her album This Time Around is brilliant. Look out GMA Dove Awards, a great new artist, female vocalist and stellar pop/contemporary album is on the way. Heather Williams is my choice as "the voice" in Christian music. This album is a 5 star work of art that brings me closer to God."

== Track listing ==
No.	Title	Writer(s)	Producer	Length
1.	"Beautiful Thing"	Jamie Moore, Molly Reed, Heather Williams, Tim Williams	Moore	3:30
2.	"God Is Still God"	Cindy Morgan Brouwer, Ben Glover, Kerrie Roberts	Moore	3:38
3.	"Hallelujah"	Moore, H. Williams, T. Williams	Moore	4:00
4.	"You Are Loved"	Chuck Butler, Riley Erin, Nate Smith	Chuck Butler	4:11
5.	"I'll Take It from You"	Butler, Ross King	Butler	3:50
6.	"This Time Around"	Moore, H. Williams	Moore	3:27
7.	"Start Over"	Jeff Pardo, H. Williams	Butler	3:05
8.	"Always Been Faithful"	Glover, Tony Wood	Butler	4:04
9.	"Holes"	H. Williams		3:56
10.	"Breathing Again"	Nick DePartee, Jon Howard, Moore, H. Williams	Moore	3:28
Total length:				47:06
