= Scott Sibley =

American politician, businessman, philanthropist (born 1973)

Member of the Nevada Assembly from the 22nd district
- In office 2004–2005

Personal details
- Born: Nov 24, 1973 (age 52) San Francisco, California
- Party: Republican
- Children: 3
- Education: University of Nevada, Las Vegas
- Occupation: News publisher
- Website: www.scottasibley.com

Scott Sibley (born 1973) is an American politician, businessman and philanthropist.

== Early life ==
Scott Sibley was born in California. He received his B.S. in Business Administration, Real Estate from the University of Nevada, Las Vegas. Afterwards he completed certification as both a licensed process server and licensed real estate broker.

== Business career ==
Sibley was a pressman with the Nevada Legal News owned by Uncle Hoyt beginning in 1993, and continued on until Hoyt's death in 1997 when Scott took over as editor and publisher of the newspaper. His strong real estate background, involvement with sales at the County Courthouse, and experience as a licensed process server, has made him one of the foremost experts on nonjudicial foreclosure law in Nevada. He later became the managing partner of Nevada Holistic Medicine. Scott's ability to manage complex business challenges, make high-stake decisions and successfully drive growth has played a key factor in his success. Scott has been a licensed real estate broker and real estate agent for 15 years. He has been involved in many challenging real estate transactions. In the last several years, Scott has acquired various forms of distressed debt and has been very successful at reorganizing, stabilizing and disposing of these assets. In 2017 Sibley became a partner with MMJ America, a marijuana cultivation and dispensary company. Under a joint-venture arrangement, Sibley's group owns the Vegas dispensary and MMJ runs it (along with two cultivation facilities coming online soon) for a percentage of the profits.

== Political career ==
From 2004 to 2005, Sibley served in the Nevada State Assembly, representing District No. 22 of Clark County, being elected as a Republican with 55.68% of the vote. During his tenure he co-sponsored Assembly Bill 182, which allowed students to administer their own asthma medication as school. He also introduced a bill to require all public land in Nevada to be sold by auction if put up for sale. From 2010 to 2013, Sibley was a member of the Commission for Common-Interest Communities and Condominium Hotels of the State of Nevada, a position to which he was again appointed in 2016. He later also sat on the Green Ribbon Commission for marijuana business advisory as an at-large member in 2017. The panel will set policies regarding land use and licensing of retail marijuana establishments and recommend proposed changes to zoning and business license codes.
