= Otis Clay =

American R&B and soul singer (1942–2016)

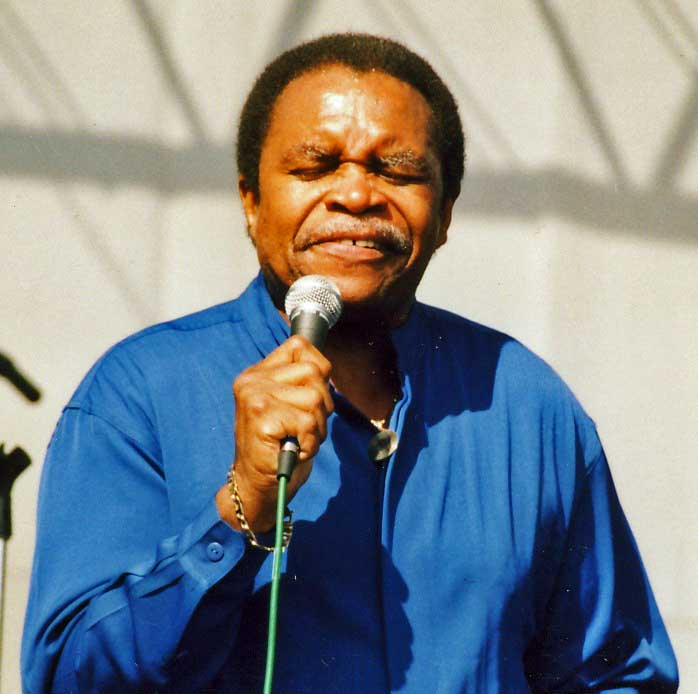
- Clay in 1997.

Background information
- Born: Otis Lee Clay; February 11, 1942; Waxhaw, Mississippi, U.S.
- Died: January 8, 2016 (aged 73) Chicago, Illinois, U.S.
- Genres: R&B, soul, gospel, blues
- Occupation: Singer
- Instrument: Vocals
- Years active: 1957–2016
- Labels: One-derful, Cotillion, Hi, Bullseye Blues, Blind Pig, Echo Records
- Formerly of: Gene Chandler
- Website: otisclay.net

Otis Lee Clay (February 11, 1942 – January 8, 2016) was an American R&B and soul singer, who started in gospel music. In 2013, Clay was inducted to the Blues Hall of Fame.

== Early life ==
Clay was born in Waxhaw, Mississippi, to a musical family, who moved in 1953 to Muncie, Indiana. After singing with local gospel group, the Voices of Hope, he returned to Mississippi to sing with the Christian Travelers, before settling in Chicago in 1957. There, he joined a series of gospel vocal groups including the Golden Jubilaires, the Famous Blue Jay Singers, the Holy Wonders, and the Pilgrim Harmonizers, before making his first solo secular recordings in 1962. They were unissued, and Clay joined the Gospel Songbirds, who recorded in Nashville in 1964 and who also included Maurice Dollison who sang R&B under the name Cash McCall, and then the Sensational Nightingales.

== Career ==
In 1965, Clay signed with One-derful! Records in Chicago, to make secular recordings. After releasing a series of gospel-tinged soul records, his first hit came in 1967 with "That's How It Is (When You're In Love)", which reached No. 34 on the US Billboard R&B chart, followed by "A Lasting Love" (No. 48 R&B). In 1968 the record company folded and his contract was bought by Atlantic Records, who launched their subsidiary Cotillion label with Clay's version of the Sir Douglas Quintet hit, "She's About A Mover", produced at the FAME Studios in Muscle Shoals. The record became Clay's biggest pop hit, reaching No. 97 on the Billboard Hot 100 (No. 47 R&B). However, follow-ups on Cotillion, including "Hard Working Woman" produced by Syl Johnson, and "Is It Over?" produced by Willie Mitchell in Memphis, were less successful.

Clay moved to Mitchell's Hi Records in 1971, and made many of his best known soul blues records for the label. His biggest hit came in late 1972 with "Trying To Live My Life Without You," a No. 102 hit on the Billboard Hot 100, No. 70 on Cash Box, and No. 24 R&B, which he followed up with "If I Could Reach Out". "Tryin' to Live My Life Without You" was later covered by Bob Seger, whose version hit No. 5 on the pop chart in 1981. After several more Hi singles and the album I Can't Take It, Clay moved to Kayvette Records, where he had his last national hit single in 1977, "All Because Of Your Love" (No. 44 R&B). He later recorded for the Elka, Glades, Rooster Blues, and Rounder labels, as well as his own Echo Records for whom he recorded the original version of "The Only Way Is Up" in 1980.

He remained a popular live act in Europe and Japan, as well as the US, and recorded three live albums, Soul Man: Live in Japan, Otis Clay Live (also in Japan on Victor VDP-5111), and Respect Yourself, recorded live at the Lucerne Blues Festival in Switzerland. In the 1990s he also recorded two albums for Bullseye Blues: I'll Treat You Right and the Willie Mitchell-produced This Time Around. In 2007, he released the gospel album Walk a Mile in My Shoes, which earned him a Grammy nomination for Best Traditional R&B Vocal Performance.

In 2010, Clay was honored with a marker on the Mississippi Blues Trail in Waxhaw.

As a resident of Chicago's West Side, he was actively involved in community-based economic and cultural initiatives, including the development of The Harold Washington Cultural Center. On August 11, 2012, he was one of several acts that performed at Lincoln Center Out of Doors Summer Concerts in New York City. He was backed by the band Platinum. Clay was joined on stage for the finale by William Bell and Teenie Hodges. Clay was one of the 2013 inductees to the Blues Hall of Fame. In 2015 Otis published with Billy Price the album This Time For Real.

During 2015, Otis Clay and Johnny Rawls won the Blues Blast Award for Soul Album of the Year for their album, Soul Brothers. Soul Brothers was also nominated for Blues Music Award Soul Album of the Year and Living Blues Blues Album of the Year. It was selected as the number 6 Blues Album of the Year in the DownBeat Critics' Poll, being the only soul album on the list of top 20 albums.

== Death and funeral ==
On January 8, 2016, Clay died in Chicago, Illinois, at the age of 73 of a heart attack. Clay's funeral was held on January 16, 2016, at the Liberty Baptist Church in Chicago. After the funeral, he was buried at the Oak Woods Cemetery in Chicago.

== Discography ==
=== Albums ===
- Trying to Live My Life Without You (1972)
- I Can't Take It (1977)
- Live! (1978)
- The Only Way Is Up (1982)
- Live Again! (1984)
- Soul Man – Live in Japan (1985) reissue of Live Again!
- Watch Me Now (1989)
- I'll Treat You Right (1992)
- On My Way Home (1993)
- The Gospel Truth (1993) reissue of On My Way Home
- You Are My Life (1995)
- This Time Around (1998)
- Testify! (2003)
- In The House (2005) AKA Respect Yourself
- Walk a Mile in My Shoes (2007)
- Truth Is (2012)
- Soul Brothers (2014) Otis Clay & Johnny Rawls
- This Time for Real (2015) Billy Price & Otis Clay
- Mississippi Poor Boy (2016)
- Live in Switzerland 2006 (2016)

=== Singles ===
Year	Title	Chart positions		
Year	Title	US Hot 100	US R&B	US Cash Box
1966	"I'm Satisfied"	105	—	—
1967	"That's How It Is (When You're in Love)"	131	34	—
1967	"A Lasting Love"	—	48	—
1968	"She's About a Mover"	97	47	—
1972	"Tryin' to Live My Life Without You"	102	24	70
1977	"All Because of Your Love"	—	44	—
1980	"The Only Way Is Up"	—	—	—
"—" denotes a recording that did not chart or was not released in that territory.
