= Cash McCall (musician) =

American musician (1941–2019)

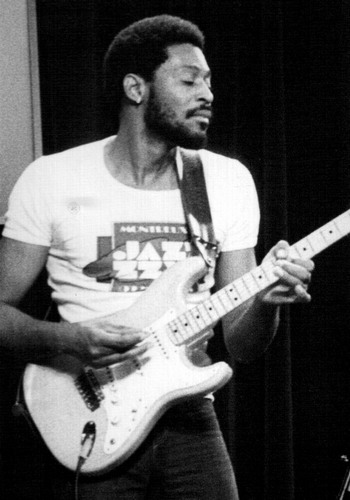
- McCall in 1978

Background information
- Born: Maurice Dollison Jr. January 28, 1941; New Madrid, Missouri, United States
- Died: April 20, 2019 (aged 78); Merrillville, Indiana, United States
- Genre: Electric blues
- Occupations: Guitarist, singer, songwriter
- Instruments: Guitar, vocals
- Years active: 1963–2019
- Website: https://www.cashmccallmusic.com/

Cash McCall (born Maurice Dollison Jr.; January 28, 1941 – April 20, 2019) was an American electric blues guitarist, singer and songwriter. He was best known for his 1966 R&B hit "When You Wake Up". Over his long career, his musical style evolved from gospel music to soul music to the blues.

== Biography ==
McCall was born in New Madrid, Missouri. He joined the United States Army and then settled in Chicago, where he had lived for a period as a child. In 1964, he played guitar and sang, alongside Otis Clay, with the Gospel Songbirds, who recorded for Excello Records. He later joined another gospel singing ensemble, the Pilgrim Jubilee Singers.

Billed under his birth name, his debut solo single release was "Earth Worm" (1963). Three years later he co-wrote "When You Wake Up" with the record producer Monk Higgins. His initial soul-styled demo was issued by Thomas Records, which billed him as Cash McCall. ("Cash McCall" had been a 1955 novel by Cameron Hawley which spawned a 1960 movie starring James Garner as Cash McCall, released six years before the record company changed Dollison's name). The song reached number 19 on the US Billboard R&B chart. This led to McCall touring with Lou Christie and Mitch Ryder in Dick Clark's Caravan of Stars. However, subsequent releases for both Thomas and Checker Records failed to chart. These included the song "It's Wonderful to Be in Love". In 1967, McCall co-wrote "That's How It Is (When You're in Love)", a Top 30 R&B hit for Otis Clay.

Under the tutelage of Willie Dixon, McCall went on to become a session musician and songwriter for Chess Records. In the late 1960s, McCall, along with Jimmy Dawkins and Johnny Twist, played guitar on some early recordings by George "Wild Child" Butler.

McCall gravitated towards the blues in the 1970s. He recorded the album Omega Man (1973) before relocating to Los Angeles in 1976. He recorded the album No More Doggin', released in 1983. In 1985, McCall and his band appeared at the Long Beach Blues Festival. In 1987, Stony Plain Records released the album Cash Up Front. The collection included accompaniment by such notables such Nathan East and Welton Gite (bass); Chuck Findley (flugelhorn, trumpet); Les McCann and Richard Tee (piano); Phil Upchurch (rhythm guitar); and Hank Cicalo (sound engineer) and Bernie Grundman (mastering).

McCall co-produced Willie Dixon's Grammy Award–winning Hidden Charms (1988) and played in Dixon's All-Stars band, after which he toured as a solo artist and appeared with the Chicago Rhythm and Blues Kings, for which he wrote several songs. He also provided backing to the singer known as Big Twist and performed in the Chicago Blues Review. McCall's songs have been recorded by the Blind Boys of Alabama, the Mighty Reapers, Margie Evans, Tyrone Davis and Mitty Collier.

In 2018, McCall and longtime friend and fellow Chicago musician Benny Turner reunited in the studio to record Going Back Home. It was released in January 2019. Just months later, on April 20, 2019, McCall died from lung cancer.

== Awards and accolades ==
- 17th Independent Music Awards – Nominee for Blues Album – Going Back Home
- 2019 Blues Blast Music Awards – Nominee for Traditional Blues Album – Going Back Home
- 2019 Independent Blues Awards – Nominee for Best Traditional Blues CD – Going Back Home
- 18th Independent Music Awards – Nominee for Blues Song – "One Who's Got a Lot"

== Discography ==
=== Singles ===
Titles	Record label	Year of release
"You Can't Take Love" / "Let's Get a Thing Going On"	Thomas 310	1966
"You Mean Everything to Me" / "That Lucky Old Sun"	Thomas 311	1966
"Let's Try It Over" / "It's Wonderful (To Be in Love)"	Thomas 312	1966
"I'm in Danger" / "S. O. S."	Checker 1184	1967
"We've Come a Long Way Together" / "It's Not How Good You Make It"	Checker 1216	1969
"I'll Always Love You" / "More Power to You"	PS Records 501	1969
"One Who's Got a Lot"	Nola Blue Records	2020
"Blues Coming Down"	Nola Blue Records	2021

=== Albums ===
Album title	Record label	Year of release
Omega Man	Paula Records	1973
No More Doggin'	L & R Records	1983
Cash Up Front	Stony Plain Records	1987
Going Back Home (with Benny Turner) (Includes Cash's original song "Money")	Nola Blue Records	2019

=== Compilation albums ===
Album title	Record label	Year of release
Blues Classics	L & R Records	1996
The Best of Cash McCall	Snowball Records	2007

=== As sideman ===
With Dorothy Ashby

- The Rubaiyat of Dorothy Ashby (Cadet, 1970)

With Howlin' Wolf

- Message to the Young (Chess, 1971) – producer, arranger and conductor

With Jack McDuff

- Gin and Orange (Cadet, 1969)

With Phil Upchurch

- The Way I Feel (Cadet, 1970)

== See also ==
- List of electric blues musicians
