= Al Green's Greatest Hits =

Greatest hits album by Al Green
- Released: March 1975
- Genre: Soul
- Length: 36:34
- Label: Hi/Right Stuff/EMI
- Producer: Willie Mitchell

Al Green chronology
Al Green Explores Your Mind (1974)	Al Green's Greatest Hits (1975)	Al Green Is Love (1975)

Alternative cover
- Al Green's Greatest Hits: Deluxe Edition

Professional ratings
Review scores
Source	Rating
AllMusic	5/5 stars
Christgau's Record Guide	A
Pitchfork	9.7/10
The Village Voice	A+

Al Green's Greatest Hits is a 1975 greatest hits release by soul singer Al Green. In 2003, the album was ranked number 52 on Rolling Stone's list of "The 500 Greatest Albums of All Time", maintaining the rating in a 2012 revised list. The album's ranking dropped to number 456 in the 2020 revised list. The compilation has consistently ranked as one of the best executed 'greatest hits' albums in history. The album peaked at No. 3 on the Billboard Top Soul LPs chart and No. 17 on the Top LPs chart.

== Track listing ==
=== Side one ===
No.	Title	Writer(s)	Album release	Length
1.	"Tired of Being Alone"	Al Green	Al Green Gets Next to You (1971)	2:43
2.	"Call Me (Come Back Home)"	Al Green, Willie Mitchell, Al Jackson Jr.	Call Me (1973)	3:03
3.	"I'm Still in Love with You"	Al Green, Willie Mitchell, Al Jackson Jr.	I'm Still in Love with You (1972)	3:14
4.	"Here I Am (Come and Take Me)"	Al Green, Mabon Hodges	Call Me	4:14
5.	"How Can You Mend a Broken Heart" (replaced by "Love and Happiness" in later reissues)	Barry Gibb, Robin Gibb	Let's Stay Together (1972)	6:22

=== Side two ===
No.	Title	Writer(s)	Album release	Length
1.	"Let's Stay Together"	Al Green, Willie Mitchell, Al Jackson Jr.	Let's Stay Together	§4:45
2.	"I Can't Get Next to You"	Barrett Strong, Norman Whitfield	Al Green Gets Next to You	3:52
3.	"You Ought to Be with Me"	Al Green, Willie Mitchell, Al Jackson Jr.	Call Me	3:19
4.	"Look What You Done for Me"	Al Green, Willie Mitchell, Al Jackson Jr.	I'm Still in Love with You	3:06
5.	"Let's Get Married"	Al Green	Livin' for You (1973)	3:23
Total length:				38:01

§ extended version not on 1972 LP

=== 1995 compact disc reissue ===
No.	Title	Writer(s)	Original album	Length
1.	"Tired of Being Alone"	Al Green	Al Green Gets Next to You (1971)	2:43
2.	"Call Me (Come Back Home)"	Al Green, Willie Mitchell, Al Jackson Jr.	Call Me (1973)	3:03
3.	"I'm Still in Love with You"	Al Green, Willie Mitchell, Al Jackson Jr.	I'm Still in Love with You (1972)	3:14
4.	"Here I Am (Come and Take Me)"	Al Green, Mabon Hodges	Call Me	4:14
5.	"Love and Happiness"	Al Green, Mabon Hodges	I'm Still in Love with You	5:03
6.	"Let's Stay Together"	Al Green, Willie Mitchell, Al Jackson Jr.	Let's Stay Together (1972)	3:18
7.	"I Can't Get Next to You"	Barrett Strong, Norman Whitfield	Al Green Gets Next to You	3:52
8.	"You Ought to Be with Me"	Al Green, Willie Mitchell, Al Jackson Jr.	Call Me	3:19
9.	"Look What You Done for Me"	Al Green, Willie Mitchell, Al Jackson Jr.	I'm Still in Love with You	3:06
10.	"Let's Get Married"	Al Green	Livin' for You (1973)	3:23
11.	"Livin' for You"	Al Green, Willie Mitchell	Livin' for You	3:11
12.	"Sha La La (Make Me Happy)"	Al Green	Al Green Explores Your Mind (1974)	3:02
13.	"L-O-V-E (Love)"	Al Green, Willie Mitchell, Mabon Hodges	Al Green Is Love (1975)	3:08
14.	"Full of Fire"	Al Green, Willie Mitchell, Mabon Hodges	Full of Fire (1976)	3:29
15.	"Belle"	Al Green, Fred Jordan, Reuben Fairfax Jr.	The Belle Album (1977)	4:50
Total length:				52:55

== Personnel ==
The following credits refer to Al Green Greatest Hits: Deluxe Edition

- Al Green — vocals
- Charles Chalmers — string arrangements
- James Mitchell — baritone saxophone, string arrangements
- Wayne Jackson — trumpet
- Jack Hale — trombone
- Ed Logan, Andrew Love — tenor saxophone
- Charles Hodges — organ, piano
- Michael Allen, Archie Turner — piano
- Teenie Hodges — electric guitar
- Leroy Hodges — bass
- Al Jackson Jr. — drums, percussion
- Howard Grimes, Ali Muhammed Jackson — bongos, drums, conga
- Rhodes, Chalmers & Rhodes — background vocals

Production personnel

- Al Green — original producer
- Willie Mitchell — original producer, engineer, remixing
- Bob Levy, Buddy Rosenburg — photography
- Tom Cartwright — reissue executive producer
- Chris Clough, Kevin Flaherty – reissue producers
- Margaret Goldfarb, Kathy Kinslow, Charles Levan, Tami Masak, Cheryl Pawelski — reissue production assistants
- Howard Craft, Dan Hersch, Bill Inglot, Robert Vosgien – remastering
- Richard Kriegler, Susan Lavioue, Richard E. Roth — reissue art direction

== Certifications ==
Region	Certification	Certified units/sales
United Kingdom (BPI)	Silver	60,000^{^}
United States (RIAA)	2× Platinum	2,000,000^{^}
^{^} Shipments figures based on certification alone.
