= Straight from the Heart (Ann Peebles album) =

Studio album by Ann Peebles
- Released: 1972
- Recorded: 1971
- Studio: Royal Recording Studios, South Lauderdale, Memphis, Tennessee
- Genre: Memphis soul, blues, funk
- Length: 26:08
- Label: Hi
- Producer: Willie Mitchell

Ann Peebles chronology
Part Time Love (1971)	Straight from the Heart (1972)	I Can't Stand the Rain (1974)

Singles from I Can't Stand The Rain
- 1. "I Pity the Fool" Released: 1971; 2. "Slipped, Tripped and Fell In Love" Released: 1971; 3. "Breaking Up Somebody's Home" Released: 1972; 4. "Somebody's on Your Case" Released: 1972

Straight from the Heart is the third studio album by American Memphis soul singer Ann Peebles. It was released on the Hi label in 1972 and included the songs "I Pity the Fool" and "Breaking Up Somebody's Home".

== Background ==
Peebles' second album, Part Time Love, in 1971 was her first record to impact the US R&B albums chart, and she began recording her third studio album at the Royal Recording Studios in Memphis, Tennessee later that year. Peebles' enlisted Willie Mitchell to produce the album and songwriters such as Don Bryant (with whom she was in a relationship and would go on to marry in 1974) and George Jackson. Straight From The Heart also features the Hi Rhythm Section, the house band for the Hi label.

Straight from the Heart was released later in 1971 and the song "I Pity the Fool", originally recorded by Bobby Bland in 1961, became a minor hit for Peebles, as it peaked at no. 85 on the Billboard Hot 100. This was her second song to impact the US singles chart, after "Part Time Love" reached no. 45 in 1970.

The opening line to the song “Trouble, Heartaches & Sadness” was sampled by hip-hop producer RZA of the Wu-Tang Clan for the song "Da Mystery of Chessboxin'", from their debut album Enter the Wu-Tang (36 Chambers).

== Reception ==
Professional ratings
Review scores
Source	Rating
AllMusic	4.5/5 stars
Christgau's Record Guide: Rock Albums of the Seventies	A−

Straight from the Heart was well received by critics, with Richie Unterberger awarding the album 4.5 out of 5 stars in his AllMusic review. Unterberger described the album as "not only a triumph for Peebles, but [Straight from the Heart] illustrated how the Hi label had surpassed its crosstown Stax rival for quality Memphis soul in the early '70s". In his 1981 review of Straight from the Heart in Christgau's Record Guide: Rock Albums of the Seventies, music journalist Robert Christgau gave the album an A− and wrote that "why gritty singing like this can't be heard on 'progressive' radio when a borderline hysteric like Lydia Pense is an automatic add ought to be investigated by the Civil Rights Commission."

The album was also a modest commercial success for Peebles, becoming her first record to chart on the Billboard 200, where it peaked at no. 188. She would go on to enjoy further commercial success with her next album, I Can't Stand the Rain, in 1974.

== Track listing ==
=== Side A ===
1. "Slipped, Tripped And Fell In Love" (George Jackson) – 2:25
2. "Trouble, Heartaches & Sadness" (Don Bryant, Ann Peebles) – 2:37
3. "What You Laid On Me" (Peebles, Denise LaSalle) – 2:22
4. "How Strong Is A Woman" (Bettye Crutcher) – 2:57
5. "Somebody's On Your Case" (Earl Randle) – 2:35

=== Side B ===
1. "I Feel Like Breaking Up Somebody's Home Tonight" (Jackson, Timothy Matthews) – 2:28
2. "I've Been There Before" (Bryant, Peebles) – 3:06
3. "I Pity The Fool" (Deadric Malone) – 2:53
4. "99 Pounds" (Bryant) – 2:15
5. "I Take What I Want" (David Porter, Isaac Hayes, Teenie Hodges) – 2:30

== Personnel ==
- Ann Peebles – vocals
- Rhodes, Chalmers, Rhodes – backing vocals
- Howard Grimes – drums
- Leroy Hodges – bass guitar
- Teenie Hodges – guitar
- Charles Hodges – organ, piano
- Andrew Love – tenor saxophone
- Ed Logan – tenor saxophone
- James Mitchell – baritone saxophone
- Jack Hale – trombone
- Wayne Jackson – trumpet
- Willie Mitchell – producer
- Howard Craft – lacquer cutting
- Bud Lee – photography [cover & liner]

== Charts ==
Chart (1971)	Peak position
U.S. Top LPs & Tape (Billboard)	188
U.S. Soul LPs (Billboard)	42
