= Al Green Explores Your Mind =

Studio album by Al Green
- Released: October 1974
- Recorded: 1974
- Studios: Royal, Memphis, Tennessee
- Genre: Soul
- Length: 30:26
- Label: Hi
- Producers: Willie Mitchell, Al Green

Al Green chronology
Livin' for You (1973)	Al Green Explores Your Mind (1974)	Al Green's Greatest Hits (1975)

Professional ratings
Review scores
Source	Rating
AllMusic	4/5 stars
Christgau's Record Guide	B+
The Encyclopedia of Popular Music	5/5 stars
Tom Hull	A−
Rolling Stone	4/5 stars

Al Green Explores Your Mind is the eighth album by soul singer Al Green. Unlike previous Al Green albums, this album featured only one major hit, "Sha-La-La (Make Me Happy)" which peaked at No. 7 on the U.S. Billboard Hot 100 the week of December 21, 1974, but did contain the original version of "Take Me to the River", a song which went to No. 26 on the Billboard chart when covered by Talking Heads in 1978. In 2004, the song "Take Me to the River" was ranked number 117 on Rolling Stone's list of the 500 greatest songs of all time.

The album was his fifth consecutive album to claim No. 1 on the Soul Albums chart, and peaked at No. 15 on the Pop Albums chart.

== Track listing ==
All tracks composed by Al Green; except where indicated

Side one

1. "Sha-La-La (Make Me Happy)" – 3:01
2. "Take Me to the River" (Green, Mabon "Teenie" Hodges) – 3:45
3. "God Blessed Our Love" (Green, Willie Mitchell, Earl Randle) – 3:57
4. "The City" (Green, Charles Hodges) – 3:25
5. "One Nite Stand" – 2:26

Side two

1. "I'm Hooked on You" (Green, Mitchell) – 3:22
2. "Stay with Me Forever" (Green, Anne Sanders) – 3:15
3. "Hangin' On" (Green, Michael Allen) – 4:21
4. "School Days" – 3:14

== Personnel ==
- Al Green – vocals
- Mabon "Teenie" Hodges – guitar
- Leroy Hodges – bass guitar
- Charles Hodges – Hammond organ, piano
- Howard Grimes – drums, congas
- Archie Turner, Michael Allen – piano
- Charles Chalmers, Donna Rhodes, Sandra Rhodes – backing vocals
- Andrew Love, Ed Logan – tenor saxophone
- James Mitchell – baritone saxophone, string arrangements
- Wayne Jackson – trumpet
- Jack Hale, Sr. – trombone
- The Memphis Strings – strings

Technical

- Glenn Ross, Richard Kriegler – art direction, design
- Bob Levy, Buddy Rosenberg – photography

== See also ==
- List of Billboard number-one R&B albums of 1975
