= I Can't Stand the Rain (album) =

Studio album by Ann Peebles
- Released: 1974
- Recorded: 1973
- Studio: Royal Recording Studios, South Lauderdale, Memphis, Tennessee
- Genre: Memphis soul
- Length: 27:16
- Label: Hi
- Producer: Willie Mitchell

Ann Peebles chronology
Straight from the Heart (1972)	I Can't Stand the Rain (1974)	Tellin' It (1975)

Singles from I Can't Stand The Rain
- 1. "I'm Gonna Tear Your Playhouse Down" Released: January 1973; 2. "I Can't Stand the Rain" Released: 1973

Professional ratings
Review scores
Source	Rating
Allmusic	link
Christgau's Record Guide	B+

I Can't Stand the Rain is the fourth studio album by American Memphis soul singer Ann Peebles. It was released on the Hi label in 1974 and was her highest-charting record on the Billboard 200, where it reached no. 155 and spent 7 weeks. Produced by Willie Mitchell and largely written by Peebles and her husband, Don Bryant, I Can't Stand the Rain included the R&B hits "I'm Gonna Tear Your Playhouse Down" and "I Can't Stand the Rain", the latter of which reached no. 6 on the R&B chart and no. 38 on the Billboard Hot 100 in 1973.

== Track listing ==
=== Side A ===
1. "I Can't Stand the Rain" (Don Bryant, Bernard "Bernie" Miller, Ann Peebles) – 2:31
2. "Do I Need You" (Bryant, Peebles) – 2:33
3. "Until You Came Into My Life" (Bryant, Miller, Peebles) – 3:13
4. "(You Keep Me) Hanging On" (Ira Allen, Buddy Mize) – 2:44
5. "Run Run Run" (Bryant, Darryl Carter, Peebles) – 2:38

=== Side B ===
1. "If We Can't Trust Each Other" (Earl Randle) – 2:55
2. "A Love Vibration" (Bryant, Miller, Peebles) – 2:50
3. "You Got to Feed the Fire" (Bryant, Miller, Peebles) – 2:22
4. "I'm Gonna Tear Your Playhouse Down" (Earl Randle) – 2:45
5. "One Way Street" (Bryant, Peebles) – 2:50

== Personnel ==
- Ann Peebles – vocals
- Howard Grimes – drums
- Charles Hodges – Hammond organ
- Leroy Hodges – bass guitar
- Mabon "Teenie" Hodges – guitar
- Wayne Jackson – trumpet
- Jack Hale – trombone
- Ed Logan – tenor saxophone
- Andrew Love – tenor saxophone
- James Mitchell – baritone saxophone
- Archie Turner – piano
- The Memphis Strings – string section
- Charles Chalmers, Donna Rhodes, Sandra Rhodes – background vocals

== Charts ==
Chart (1974)	Peak position
U.S. Top LPs & Tape (Billboard)	155
U.S. Soul LPs (Billboard)	25
