= Al Green Is Love =

- Standard/Original artwork

Studio album by Al Green
- Released: August 1975
- Recorded: 1974–1975
- Genre: Soul
- Length: 41:25
- Label: Hi
- Producer: Willie Mitchell

Al Green chronology
Al Green's Greatest Hits (1975)	Al Green Is Love (1975)	Full of Fire (1976)

Singles from Al Green Is Love
- 1. "L-O-V-E (Love)" Released: February 19, 1975

Professional ratings
Review scores
Source	Rating
AllMusic	4/5 stars
Christgau's Record Guide	B+
MSN Music (Consumer Guide)	A
The Rolling Stone Album Guide	3.5/5 stars
The Village Voice	A−

Al Green Is Love is the ninth album by soul singer Al Green. It was his final of six consecutive albums to hit number 1 on the R&B/Soul Albums chart, and it peaked into the Top 40 on the Pop Albums chart.

== Track listing ==
All tracks composed by Al Green; except where indicated

Side one

1. "L-O-V-E (Love)" (Green, Willie Mitchell, Mabon "Teenie" Hodges) – 3:09
2. "Rhymes" (Green, Mabon "Teenie" Hodges) – 3:36
3. "The Love Sermon" (Green, Willie Mitchell, Earl Randle) – 6:34
4. "There Is Love" (Willie Mitchell, Lawrence Seymore, Yvonne Mitchell) – 3:04
5. "Could I Be the One?" (Green, Willie Mitchell, Ann Mitchell) – 4:06

Side two

1. "Love Ritual" – 4:19
2. "I Didn't Know" – 7:46
3. "Oh Me, Oh My (Dreams in My Arms)" (Green, Willie Mitchell, Mabon "Teenie" Hodges) – 2:48
4. "I Gotta Be More (Take Me Higher)" – 2:45
5. "I Wish You Were Here" (Willie Mitchell) – 3:18

== Personnel ==
- Al Green - vocals
- Larry Lee, Teenie Hodges - guitar
- Leroy Hodges - bass
- Charles Hodges - organ, piano
- Howard Grimes - drums, congas
- Conga Lou (Johnny Keyes) - congas
- Archie Turner, Michael Allen - piano
- Charles Chalmers, Donna Rhodes, Sandra Rhodes - backing vocals
- Andrew Love, Lewis Collins - tenor saxophone
- Wayne Jackson - trumpet
- James Mitchell - baritone saxophone, string arrangements
- Jack Hale - trombone
- The Memphis Strings - strings

== See also ==
- List of Billboard number-one R&B albums of 1975
