= Have a Good Time (Al Green album) =

- Standard/Original artwork

Studio album by Al Green
- Released: November 18, 1976
- Recorded: 1976
- Genre: Soul
- Length: 30:11
- Label: Hi
- Producer: Willie Mitchell, Al Green

Al Green chronology
Full of Fire (1976)	Have a Good Time (1976)	Al Green's Greatest Hits, Vol. 2 (1977)

Professional ratings
Review scores
Source	Rating
AllMusic	3/5 stars
Christgau's Record Guide	B+
Rolling Stone	(mixed) (1977) (2004)
Sounds	5/5 stars

Have a Good Time is the 11th studio album by soul singer Al Green, released in 1976.

== Track listing ==
All tracks composed by Al Green and Willie Mitchell; except where indicated

Side one

1. "Keep Me Cryin'" – 3:08
2. "Smile a Little Bit More" – 2:53
3. "I Tried to Tell Myself" – 3:28
4. "Something" – 4:24
5. "The Truth Marches On" – 2:42

Side two

1. "Have a Good Time" (Green) – 3:38
2. "Nothing Takes the Place of You" (Toussaint McCall, Alan Robinson) – 4:39
3. "Happy" – 2:40
4. "Hold on Forever" (Green) – 2:38

== Personnel ==
- Al Green: vocals
- Charles Chalmers, Donna Rhodes, Sandra Rhodes: backing vocals
- Mabon "Teenie" Hodges: guitars
- Michael Hodges, Michael Toles: guitars, sitar
- Michael Allen, James H. Brown, Archie Turner: piano
- Charles Hodges: organ
- Leroy Hodges: bass
- Gene Chrisman, Howard Grimes: drums, percussion
- Lewis Collins, Bill Easley: tenor saxophone
- Andrew Love: alto saxophone
- James Mitchell: baritone saxophone
- Jack Hale Jr., Wayne Jackson: trumpet
- Jack Hale Sr., Jackie Thomas: trombone
- The Memphis Strings: strings
- Strings and horns arranged by Willie Mitchell and Aarion Nesbit
