= Call Me (Al Green album) =

Studio album by Al Green
- Released: July 18, 1973
- Recorded: 1972
- Studios: Royal, Memphis, Tennessee
- Genres: Soul; R&B
- Length: 35:07
- Label: Hi
- Producers: Willie Mitchell, Al Green

Al Green chronology
I'm Still in Love with You (1972)	Call Me (1973)	Livin' for You (1973)

Professional ratings
Review scores
Source	Rating
AllMusic	5/5 stars
Blender	5/5 stars
Christgau's Record Guide	A+
Tom Hull	A+
Rolling Stone (1973)	(favorable)
Rolling Stone (2004)	5/5 stars

Call Me is the sixth album by soul singer Al Green, released on July 18, 1973. It is widely regarded as Green's masterpiece, and has been called one of the best soul albums ever made. In 2003 the TV network VH1 named it the 70th greatest album in any genre. Call Me was a Top 10 Billboard Pop Album, and Green's third No. 1 Soul Album. In 2003, the album was ranked number 289 on Rolling Stone magazine's list of the 500 greatest albums of all time, and 290 in a 2012 revised list. Praised for his emotive singing style, Green here incorporates country influences, covering both Willie Nelson and Hank Williams. This album contained three top 10 singles on the Billboard Hot 100: "You Ought to Be with Me", "Here I Am (Come and Take Me)" and "Call Me (Come Back Home)".

== Track listing ==
All tracks are written by Al Green, except where noted.

Side one
No.	Title	Writer(s)	Length
1.	"Call Me (Come Back Home)"	Al Green, Al Jackson Jr., Willie Mitchell	3:03
2.	"Have You Been Making Out O.K."		3:42
3.	"Stand Up"		3:25
4.	"I'm So Lonesome I Could Cry"	Hank Williams	3:10
5.	"Your Love Is Like the Morning Sun"		3:09
Total length:			16:29

Side two
No.	Title	Writer(s)	Length
1.	"Here I Am (Come and Take Me)"	Green, Teenie Hodges	4:14
2.	"Funny How Time Slips Away"	Willie Nelson	5:33
3.	"You Ought to Be with Me"	Green, Jackson Jr., Mitchell	3:15
4.	"Jesus Is Waiting"		5:36
Total length:			18:38

== Personnel ==
- Al Green – vocals, producer
- Willie Mitchell – producer, engineer
- Charles Chalmers – background vocals, horn arrangements
- Margaret Goldfarb – assistant producer
- Howard Grimes – drums
- Jack Hale Sr. – trombone
- Charles Hodges – Hammond organ, piano
- Leroy Hodges – bass
- Mabon "Teenie" Hodges – guitar
- Wayne Jackson – trumpet
- Kathy Kinslow – assistant producer
- Charles Levan – assistant producer
- Ed Logan – tenor saxophone
- Andrew Love – tenor saxophone
- The Memphis Strings – strings
- James Mitchell – baritone saxophone, horn arrangements
- Bud O'Shea – executive producer
- Eli Okun – executive producer
- Cheryl Pawelski – assistant producer
- Donna Rhodes – background vocals
- Sandra Rhodes – background vocals
- Archie Turner – piano
- Al Jackson Jr. – drums
- Robert Gordon – liner notes
- Jim Cummins – photography

== Chart positions ==
Billboard Music Charts (North America) – album

- 1973 Pop Albums No. 10
- 1973 Black Albums No. 1

Billboard (North America) – singles

- 1972 "You Ought to Be with Me" Pop Singles No. 3
- 1972 "You Ought to Be with Me" Black Singles No. 1
- 1973 "Call Me (Come Back Home)" Pop Singles No. 10
- 1973 "Here I Am (Come and Take Me)" Pop Singles No. 10
- 1973 "Call Me (Come Back Home)" Black Singles No. 2
- 1973 "Here I Am (Come and Take Me)" Black Singles No. 2

== See also ==
- List of Billboard number-one R&B albums of 1973
