= Livin' for You =

Studio album by Al Green
- Released: December 6, 1973
- Recorded: 1973
- Studio: Royal, Memphis, Tennessee
- Genre: Soul
- Length: 39:12
- Label: Hi
- Producer: Willie Mitchell

Al Green chronology
Call Me (1973)	Livin' for You (1973)	Al Green Explores Your Mind (1974)

Professional ratings
Review scores
Source	Rating
AllMusic	3.5/5 stars
Blender	5/5 stars
Christgau's Record Guide	A
Rolling Stone	(favorable) (1973) (2004)

Livin' for You is the seventh album from soul musician Al Green. Released in 1973 it includes the hit title track and "Let's Get Married." The album cracked the Top 25 in the Billboard Pop Albums chart and was the fourth album from the artist to peak at No. 1 on the Soul Albums chart.

== Track listing ==
Side one

1. "Livin' for You" (Al Green, Willie Mitchell) – 3:12
2. "Home Again" (Green) – 3:59
3. "Free at Last" (Green) – 3:30
4. "Let's Get Married" (Green) – 5:36
5. "So Good to Be Here" (Green, Michael Allen) – 2:47

Side two

1. "Sweet Sixteen" (Green) – 3:30
2. "Unchained Melody" (Alex North, Hy Zaret) – 5:35
3. "My God Is Real" (Green, Kenneth Morris) – 2:43
4. "Beware" (Green) – 8:20

== Personnel ==
- Al Green – vocals
- Teenie Hodges – guitar
- Leroy Hodges – bass
- Charles Hodges – piano, organ
- Al Jackson Jr. – drums
- Howard Grimes – drums, congas
- Archie Turner, James Brown, Michael Allen – piano
- Charles Chalmers, Donna Rhodes, Sandra Rhodes – backing vocals
- Andrew Love, Ed Logan – tenor saxophone
- James Mitchell – baritone saxophone
- Wayne Jackson – trumpet
- Jack Hale Sr. – trombone
- The Memphis Strings – strings

Technical

- Vince Biondi – art direction
- Tom Daly – cover illustration

== See also ==
- List of Billboard number-one R&B albums of 1974
