= Full of Fire =

Studio album by Al Green
- Released: February 1976
- Recorded: 1975
- Studio: Royal Recording Studios (Memphis, TN)
- Genre: Soul
- Length: 34:19
- Label: Hi
- Producer: Al Green; Willie Mitchell

Al Green chronology
| Al Green Is Love (1975) | Full of Fire (1976) | Have a Good Time (1976) |

Professional ratings
Review scores
| Source | Rating |
|---|---|
| AllMusic | 3/5 stars |
| Robert Christgau | A− |
| The New Rolling Stone Album Guide | 3.5/5 stars |

Full of Fire is the tenth studio album by American soul musician Al Green. It was released in 1976 via Hi Records, marking his ninth studio album for the label. The recording sessions took place at Royal Recording Studios in Memphis. Production was handled by Green himself together with Willie Mitchell. In the United States, the album peaked at number 59 on the Billboard 200 and number 12 on the Top R&B/Hip-Hop Albums charts.

== Track listing ==
| No. | Title | Writer(s) | Length |
|---|---|---|---|
| 1. | "Glory, Glory" | William Mitchell; Albert Greene | 2:48 |
| 2. | "That's the Way It Is" | Greene | 3:41 |
| 3. | "Always" | Greene; Charles Hodges | 3:21 |
| 4. | "There's No Way" | Mitchell; Earl Randle | 3:32 |
| 5. | "I'd Fly Away" | Greene | 4:12 |
| 6. | "Full of Fire" | Mabon Hodges; Mitchell; Greene | 5:13 |
| 7. | "Together Again" | Alvis Edgar Owens Jr. | 5:20 |
| 8. | "Soon as I Get Home" | Greene; Michael Allen | 3:28 |
| 9. | "Let It Shine" | Greene; M. Hodges | 3:14 |
| Total length: | | | 34:19 |

== Personnel ==
- Albert "Al Green" Greene — vocals, producer
- Charles Chalmers — backing vocals
- Donna Rhodes — backing vocals
- Sandra Rhodes — backing vocals
- Mabon "Teenie" Hodges — guitar
- Archie Turner — piano
- Michael Allen — piano
- Charles Hodges — organ
- Leroy Hodges — bass
- Howard Grimes — drums, congas
- Andrew Love — tenor saxophone
- Lewis Collins — tenor saxophone
- James Mitchell — baritone saxophone
- Jack Hale, Jr — trumpet
- Wayne Jackson — trumpet
- Jack Hale — trombone
- The Memphis Strings — strings
- Willie Mitchell — producer, engineering
- Norman Seeff — photography

== Charts ==
| Chart (1976) | Peak position |
|---|---|
| US Billboard 200 | 59 |
| US Top R&B/Hip-Hop Albums (Billboard) | 12 |
