= Syl Johnson discography =

Musical artist discography

The discography of Syl Johnson (1936–2022), an American blues and soul singer and record producer, consists of at least 19 studio albums, 18 compilation albums and a large number of singles and EPs.

== Albums ==
- 1968: Dresses Too Short (Twinight)
1. "Dresses Too Short"
2. "I Can Take Care of Business"
3. "Different Strokes"
4. "Soul Drippin'"
5. "Fox Hunting on the Weekend"
6. "Ode to Soul Man"
7. "Come On Sock It to Me"
8. "I'll Take Those Skinny Legs"
9. "Try Me #2"
10. "Same Kind of Thing"
11. "I've Got the Real Thing"
12. "Sorry 'Bout Dat!"
- 1970: Is It Because I'm Black? (Twinight)
1. "Is It Because I'm Black"
2. "Come Together"
3. "Together, Forever"
4. "Concrete Reservation"
5. "Black Balloons"
6. "Walk a Mile in My Shoes"
7. "I'm Talkin' Bout Freedom"
8. "Right On"
- 1973: Back for a Taste of Your Love (Hi) (No. 172 on Cash Box Top LPs)
1. "Feelin' Frisky"
2. "Back for a Taste of Your Love"
3. "I'm Yours"
4. "I Let a Good Girl Go"
5. "Anyway the Wind Blows"
6. "You Don't Know Me"
7. "We Did It"
8. "Wind, Blow Her Back My Way"
9. "I Hate I Walked Away"
10. "The Love You Left Behind"
- 1974: Diamond in the Rough (Hi)
1. "Let Yourself Go"
2. "Don't Do It"
3. "I Want to Take You Home"
4. "Could I Be Falling in Love"
5. "Stuck in Chicago"
6. "Diamond in the Rough"
7. "Keeping Down Confusion"
8. "Please, Don't Give Up on Me"
9. "Music to My Ears"
10. "I Hear the Love Chimes"
- 1975: Total Explosion (Hi)
1. "I Only Have Love"
2. "Bustin' Up or Bustin' Out"
3. "Star Bright Star Lite"
4. "Watch What You Do to Me"
5. "Steppin' Out"
6. "Take Me to the River"
7. "It Ain't Easy"
8. "'Bout to Make Me Leave Home"
9. "That's Just My Luck"
- 1979: Uptown Shakedown (Hi)
1. "Mystery Lady"
2. "Let's Dance for Love"
3. "Gimme Little Sign"
4. "You're the Star of the Show"
5. "Blue Water"
6. "Who's Gonna Love You"
7. "Otis Redding Medley"
8. "Respect"
9. "Wholesale Love"
10. "Snatch a Little Piece"
11. "I Can't Turn You Loose
12. "Fa-Fa-Fa-Fa-Fa (Sad Song)"
13. "(Sittin' On) The Dock of the Bay"
- 1980: Bring Out the Blues in Me (Shama 8001)
1. "Brings Out the Blues in Me"
2. "How You Need to Be Loved"
3. "Last Night Was the Night"
4. "Got My Eyes on You"
5. "Liberated Lady"
6. "Sock It to Me"
7. "Is It Because I'm Black"
8. "Crazy People"
- 1982: Ms. Fine Brown Frame (Boardwalk 33260)
1. "Ms. Fine Brown Frame"
2. "Keep On Loving Me"
3. "They Can't See Your Good Side"
4. "Groove Me"
5. "Sweet Thing"
6. "You Don't Have to Go"
7. "It Ain't Easy"
- 1983: Suicide Blues (Isabel 900.517)
1. "If I Had a Hammer"
2. "This Little Light of Mine"
3. "Amen"
4. "Baby Workout"
5. "Before You Accuse Me"
6. "Take Me to the River"
7. "The Blues in Me"
8. "Sock It to Me"
9. "Got to Make a Change"
10. "Crazy Men"
- 1988: Foxy Brown, Volume 1, December 1988 (Shama 8003)
1. "Tripping on Your Love"
2. "Love Baby"
3. "Here We Go"
4. "Gimme Some (I Want a Taste of Fonk)"
5. "Do You Know What Love Is"
6. "Foxy Brown"
7. "They Can't See Your Good Side"
8. "Ms. Fine Brown Frame"
- 1994: Back in the Game (Delmark)
- 1995: This Time Together by Father and Daughter (Twinight) with Syleena Johnson
1. "Lover Man"
2. "Sweet Love Hang Over"
3. "Keep On Loving Me"
4. "I Needed Some Body"
5. "They Can't See Your Good Side"
6. "A Time for Us"
7. "Sister"
8. "Ms. Fine Brown Frame"
9. "I'm Woman"
10. "Trippin"
11. "Different Strokes"
12. "Piece of the Rock"
13. "Here We Go"
14. "Goodie Goodie Good Times"
- 1995: Bridge to a Legacy (Antone's)
1. "Who's Still in Love"
2. "I Been Missin' You"
3. "Half a Love"
4. "Unconditional Love"
5. "Midnight Woman"
6. "Piece of the Rock"
7. "I Don't Know Why"
8. "Let's Get It On Again"
9. "They Can't See Your Good Side"
10. "Sexy Wayz"
- 1999: Talkin' About Chicago (Delmark)
1. "Cheryl"
2. "Sweet Dynamite!"
3. "Talkin' Bout Chicago"
4. "Diff'rent Strokes (B.E.T.)"
5. "I'm Back into You"
6. "Different Kind of Man"
7. "Surrounded"
8. "Caribbean Beach"
9. "Get Free – Call Me"
10. "Trade Secret"
11. "Finger Lickin' Good"
12. "All Night Long"
13. "Woo-Wee!"
- 2000: Hands of Time (Hep-Me Records)
1. "Hands of Time"
2. "Beyond the Finish Line"
3. "Talk to Me"
4. "Wake Up Cryin'"
5. "Superwoman"
6. "You're Number One"
7. "Listen to Me Closely"
8. "Touch of Your Love"
9. "Funky Situation"
10. "Bonus" / "Wake Up Cryin'"
- 2002: Two Johnsons Are Better Than One (Evangeline) with Jimmy Johnson
1. "Two Johnsons Are Better Than One"
2. "Uncomplicated Life"
3. "I Used to Be a Millionaire"
4. "Is It Because I'm Black"
5. "If I Wuz White"
6. "I Feel the Pain"
7. "Oprah"
8. "Ashes in the Ashtray"
9. "Dangerous"
10. "Let Her Go"
11. "Living the Life"
12. "I Can't Survive"
13. "Goodie Goodie Goodtime"
14. "Bottoms Up"
- 2003: Straight Up (P-Vine PCD-25004, Japan)
- 2013: Syl Johnson with Melody Whittle, Featuring Syleena Johnson (Twinight 4086-CD2)
- LP: My Funky Funky Band
1. "Send Me Some Lovin'"
2. "Try Me"
3. "I Feel an Urge"
4. "I Resign"
5. "Love Condition"
6. "Going to the Shack"
7. "Don't Give It Away"
8. "My Funky Band"
9. Sockin' Soul Power"
10. "Double Whammy"
11. "Take Me Back"
12. "I Take Care of Homework"
13. "Let Them Hang High"

== Compilations ==
- 2000: The Complete Syl Johnson on Hi Records (Demon, UK)
- 2003: Vanthology - A Tribute To Van Morrison (Evidence) (performing Van Morrison's "Jackie Wilson Said")
- 2010: Syl Johnson: Complete Mythology (Numero Group)
- 2012: Backbeats Artists Series: Syl Johnson: Mississippi Mainman (Backbeats)

== Singles and EPs ==
Sources:

- "I've Got Love" / "Lonely Man" (7-inch) (1958)
- "Please, Please, Please / I'm Looking for My Baby (7-inch)
- "Little Sally Walker" / "I Resign from Your Love" (7-inch)
- Lulu Reed / Syl Johnson, Rhythm & Blues Volume Four, Blue Beat Style (7-inch EP)
- "Do You Know What Love Is" (7-inch)
- "Falling in Love Again" / "I've Got to Get Over" (7-inch)
- "Straight Love No Chaser" / "Surrounded", 5 versions
- "She's All Right" / "I Know" (7-inch)
- "Come On Sock It to Me" / "Try Me", 2 versions
- "Ode to Soul Man" / "I´ll Take Those Skinny Legs", 3 versions
- "Sorry Bout Dat" / "Different Strokes", 5 versions (#9CanR&B)
- "Is It Because I'm Black" / "Let Them Hang High", 4 versions
- "Take Me Back" / "I Take Care of Homework", 2 versions
- "Dresses Too Short" / "I Can Take Care of Business", 2 versions
- "Going to the Shack" / "Don't Give It Away" (7-inch)
- "One Way Ticket to Nowhere", 3 versions
- The Syl Johnson & Pieces of Peace – "Concrete Reservation" / "Together, Forever" (7-inch)
- "Annie Got Hot Pants Power", 2 versions
- "We Do It Together" / "Thank You Baby", 2 versions
- "The Love You Left Behind" / "Anyone But You", 2 versions
- "Get Ready" / "Same Kind of Thing" (7-inch)
- "That's Why" / "Everybody Needs Love" (7-inch)
- "We Did It" / "Any Way the Wind Blows", 2 versions
- "I Wanna Satisfy Your Every Need", 2 versions
- "Back for a Taste of Your Love" / "Wind, Blow Her Back My Way", 5 versions (1973)
- "Please Don't Give Up on Me" /"Let Yourself Go", 2 versions
- "I Want to Take You Home (to See Mama)" / "I Hear the Love Chimes", 6 versions
- "I'm Yours", 3 versions
- "Goodie-Goodie-Good-Times" / "Love Baby", 6 versions
- "Take Me to the River" / "Could I Be Falling in Love", 8 versions (#95Can)
- "Bout to Make Me Leave Home" / "It Ain't Easy", 2 versions
- "I Only Have Love", 2 versions
- "Star Bright, Star Lite" / "That's Just My Luck", 4 versions
- "Let Yourself Go" / "Please Don't Give Up on Me" (7’’ single)
- "Can't Nobody Stop Me Now" / "Let Me Love You" (7-inch)
- "Fonk You" / "That Wiggle" (7-inch)
- "Stand by Me" / "Main Squeeze", 2 versions
- "Otis Redding Medley" / "Mystery Lady", 2 versions
- "Mystery Lady" / "Let's Dance for Love" (7-inch)
- "Brings Out the Blues in Me" / "How You Need to Be Loved" (7-inch single)
- "Ms. Fine Brown Frame", 12 versions
- "Steppin" (7-inch)
- "I Got Your Beef" /"John, Muddy, Bob & Marvin" (7-inch single)
- "I Been Missin' You" / "Sexy Wayz" (7-inch single)
- Labi Siffre / Syl Johnson – "I Got The" / "Is It Because I'm Black?" (12-inch promo)
- "Different Strokes / Is It Because I'm Black (7-inch single)
- "All I Need Is Someone Like You" / "Do You Know What Love Is" (7-inch RE)
- Syl Johnson / Kendra Morris – "Everybody Needs Love" / "Seaside" (7-inch promo)
- "I Wanna Know" / "Well Oh Well" (7-inch)
- "Send Me Some Lovin'" / "I Resign" (7-inch single)
- Syl Johnson / E Rodney Jones & Friends, "Is It Because I'm Black" / "Soul Heaven" (7-inch single) (n.b. Soul Heaven is just an instrumental version of "Is It Because I'm Black"
- Syl Johnson / Notations – "Come On Sock It to Me" / "I'm Still Here" (7-inch)
- Mellow-D with Sil-J's New Old Soul / Syl Johnson – "Half of Love" / "Lovin' on the Run" (7-inch single)
- Syl Johnson / Charles Mann – "I've Got to Get Over" / "Hey, Little Girl" (7-inch single)
- "I Feel an Urge" / "Try Me" (7-inch)
