= Back in the Game (Syl Johnson album) =

Studio album by Syl Johnson
- Released: 1994
- Recorded: 1994
- Genre: Soul, R&B, blues
- Label: Delmark
- Producer: Pete Nathan

Syl Johnson chronology
Stuck in Chicago (1989)	Back in the Game (1994)	This Time Together by Father and Daughter (1995)

Back in the Game is an album by the American musician Syl Johnson. It was released in 1994. Johnson had not recorded an album since the 1980s, but had witnessed a revival of his music due its use as samples in hip hop production. Back in the Game was named the best blues album of 1994 by Living Blues.

== Production ==
On the majority of its tracks, the album marked a reunion between Johnson and the Hi Rhythm Section. It was produced by Pete Nathan. Johnson duets with his daughter Syleena on "Dipped in the Water". Back in the Game contains covers of Magic Sam's "All Your Love" and Little Junior Parker's version of "Driving Wheel".

== Critical reception ==
Professional ratings
Review scores
Source	Rating
AllMusic	3/5 stars
Chicago Tribune	4/4 stars
Robert Christgau	(dud)
The Encyclopedia of Popular Music	4/5 stars
MusicHound R&B: The Essential Album Guide	4/5 stars

The St. Louis Post-Dispatch wrote that Johnson's "vocals swoop, charge, lunge, and bark with all the mastery of a classic soul singer, but his songs are rarely melodically complex, nor do they develop linearly." The Chicago Tribune called the album "a stunning return to form," writing that "Johnson's voice is still a piercing, bittersweet instrument and his guitar-playing remains tersely eloquent"; the paper later listed Back in the Game as the second best contemporary blues album of 1994.

The Washington Post thought that it "shows [Johnson's] funky blues and soul skills remain surprisingly intact, as does the sinewy sensuality of his vocals." Deeming the music Chicago R&B, the Chicago Sun-Times wrote that the album "showcases the intrinsic charms of the form, recalling the days when R&B record companies like One-derful, Brunswick and Vee-Jay flourished on South Michigan Avenue."

AllMusic wrote that "although the Chicagoan moves into 12-bar blues territory on 'All of Your Love' and Roosevelt Sykes' 'Driving Wheel', it must be stressed that the majority of songs on this album are soul rather than blues." MusicHound R&B: The Essential Album Guide opined that the album "may contain the best version of the much-recorded Al Green song 'Take Me to the River'."

== Track listing ==
No.	Title	Writer(s)	Length
1.	"Back in the Game"	Syl Johnson, Pete Nathan	3:41
2.	"I Like Your Smile"	Lee Shot Williams	3:48
3.	"I Can't Stop"	Syl Johnson, Pete Nathan	4:14
4.	"Please Don't Give Up on Me"	Buddy Jarrett, Earl Randle	3:14
5.	"Keep On Loving Me"	Syl Johnson, General Crook	4:42
6.	"Take Me to the River"	Al Green, Mabon "Teenie" Hodges, Willie Mitchell	4:57
7.	"Ghetto Woman"	Syl Johnson, Pete Cosey	3:43
8.	"Watch What You Do to Me"	Mabon "Teenie" Hodges, Willie Mitchell, Earl Randle	3:12
9.	"Dipped in the Water"	Syl Johnson, Syleena Johnson	4:29
10.	"Driving Wheel"	Roosevelt Sykes	3:56
11.	"Anyway the Wind Blows"	Earl Randle	4:09
12.	"Clean Up Man"	Willie Henderson	3:48
13.	"I Will Rise Again"	Syl Johnson	4:35
14.	"All of Your Love"	Sam Maghett	7:40

== Personnel ==
- Syl Johnson – vocals, guitar, harmonica
- Howard Grimes, Morris Jennings – drums
- Charles Hodges, Fred Hodges – piano, organ
- Jon Logan, Vincent Varko – organ
- Leroy Hodges, Anthony Morris – bass
- Teenie Hodges, Pete Nathan, Will Crosby – guitar
- Ken Vandermark – tenor saxophone
- Willie Henderson – baritone saxophone
- Kenny Anderson – trumpet
- Syleena Johnson – backing vocals, vocals on "Dipped in the Water"
- Theresa Davis – backing vocals
