= House band =

Group of musicians who regularly perform at an establishment or on a TV/radio show

A house band is a group of musicians, often centrally organized by a band leader, who regularly play at an establishment. It is widely used to refer both to the bands who work on entertainment programs on television or radio, and to bands which are the regular performers at a nightclub, especially jazz and R&B clubs. The term can also refer to a group that plays sessions for a specific recording studio. House bands on television shows usually play only cover songs instead of originals, and they play during times that commercials would be seen by the home viewing audience. Therefore, only those present in the studio during the show's taping see their full performances.

== History ==
House bands emerged with jazz music in Chicago during the 1920s. The practice of using regular backing musicians during studio sessions became customary as a means for record companies to save money and add convenience at a time when the music industry had seen increased studio costs and musical specialization. With the advent of television in the 1950s, bands from the swing era of jazz typically performed on variety show programs as house bands, starting a television institution that survives to the present. One of the best-remembered, and longest-running, house bands was the NBC Orchestra of The Tonight Show Starring Johnny Carson and his predecessors. Late-night television offered security and survival for the big band, led by trumpeter Doc Severinsen, while the trends in popular music continually changed around them. Late Night with David Letterman, which began in 1982, featured Paul Shaffer and The World's Most Dangerous Band, who, unlike previous house bands, incorporated contemporary rhythm and blues and rock music. The band continued that blend with Letterman when he left for CBS to start Late Show in 1993. House bands remain a late-night talk show fixture, with many of them also serving as straight men for the host's jokes, musically introducing guests, playing in and out of commercials, composing original pieces of music for sketches, and backing up musical guests. The Roots became the first hip-hop house band on late-night television when they joined Late Night with Jimmy Fallon in 2009.

== Association with record labels and studios ==
Record labels have often employed a core group of musicians to serve as a house band or house orchestra, specifically for recording sessions. These groups can come to be regarded as an important component of a label's distinctive "sound". This use of house bands, first popularized in the 1920s, was revived during the 1960s, most notably at Motown and at Stax Records. Some of these house bands, such as Booker T. & the M.G.'s (Stax), had parallel careers as main artists in their own right.

Label/Studio	Group Name(s)	Individual Musicians
American Sound Studio	The Memphis Boys, 827 Thomas Street Band	Gene Chrisman, Tommy Cogbill, Bobby Emmons, Bobby Wood, Reggie Young
Hi Records	Hi Rhythm Section	Howard Grimes, Charles Hodges, Leroy Hodges, Teenie Hodges, Al Jackson Jr., Wayne Jackson, Andrew Love
Motown	The Funk Brothers	James Jamerson, Richard "Pistol" Allen, Jack Ashford, Earl Van Dyke, Joe Hunter, Benny Benjamin, Eddie Willis, Joe Messina, Johnny Griffith, Bob Babbitt, Uriel Jones, Dennis Coffey, Wah Wah Watson, Robert White
Philadelphia International Records/Sigma Sound Studios	MFSB	Ronnie Baker, Roland Chambers, Norman Harris, Vince Montana, Earl Young
Salsoul Records	Salsoul Orchestra	Ronnie Baker, Norman Harris, Vince Montana, Earl Young
Stax Records	The Big Six, Booker T. & the M.G.'s, The Mar-Keys	Gilbert Caple, Steve Cropper, Donald "Duck" Dunn, Al Jackson, Jr., Wayne Jackson, Booker T. Jones, Curtis Green, Isaac Hayes, Andrew Love, Floyd Newman, Gene "Bowlegs" Miller, David Porter, Lewie Steinberg
Victor	The Great White Way Orchestra, Hugo Frey's Orchestra, The Manhattan Merrymakers, Metropolitan Orchestra, The Serenaders, The Troubadours, Victor Military Band, The Victor Orchestra, The Virginians	Frank Kelly, S. H. Kendle

Note: Individuals listed may not have performed in some or any of the groups listed.
