= Love and Happiness =

Single by Al Green

from the album I'm Still in Love with You
- B-side: "So You're Leaving"
- Released: November 1972
- Recorded: 1972
- Genre: Soul, R&B
- Length: 5:07
- Label: London Records, Hi Records
- Songwriters: Al Green, Teenie Hodges
- Producer: Willie Mitchell

Al Green singles chronology
"I Tried to Tell Myself" (1977)	"Love and Happiness" (1972)	"Belle" (1977)

"Love and Happiness" is a song by Al Green from his album I'm Still in Love with You. Green co-wrote the song with Teenie Hodges. It was released as a single in the United Kingdom on London Records in 1973 and in the United States on Hi Records in 1977. It has been covered by Etta James, Al Jarreau, and many other performers.

The song was ranked #98 in Rolling Stones's 500 Greatest Songs of All Time and #861 in Dave Marsh's The Heart of Rock & Soul: The 1001 Greatest Singles Ever Made. Soul Train historian Stephen McMillian called it "quintessential Al Green" and "one of the greatest soul songs of all time." Writing in Vibe, Alan Light called it "perhaps his most perfect song."

== Composition and recording ==
Green wrote "Love and Happiness" with Teenie Hodges, with whom he also collaborated in writing "Take Me to the River", "Here I Am (Come and Take Me)", "Full of Fire", and other songs. It was produced by Willie Mitchell in the 1972 recording session for the album I'm Still in Love with You. Of the recording process, Green said:

I wouldn’t say it was a return to the old style soul of my early days, but I definitely pulled it from the same source of raw and gritty need. The result was like a slow fever, building on the beat, pushing up the temperature with each breath of the staccato horns and pushing through to delirium as we came up on the fade.

In his 2000 autobiography Take Me to the River, Green said of the song:

"Love and Happiness" was like mixing explosive chemicals — everything had to be added at just the right time and at just the right dose. The tempo was the most important thing to Willie, and, if you listen close, you can hear Teenie counting off with his foot on a cardboard box for the take that nailed it.

== Chart performance ==
On April 27, 1973, London Records released "Love and Happiness" as a UK single, backed with "So You're Leaving" (catalog number 10419). Hi Records, however, did not release the song as a single at the time that the album I'm Still in Love with You was on the charts, instead releasing the title track, "Look What You Done for Me", and "For the Good Times". The song nonetheless gained popularity in the U.S. from radio airplay, and his performance of the song on Soul Train on March 3, 1973.

In an attempt to boost Green's flagging record sales, an edited version of the song was finally released as a U.S. single in the summer of 1977, backed with "Glory Glory" (catalog number 45-2324). The single peaked at #104 on the pop chart and #92 on the R&B chart.

The song was also featured as the lead-off track on Al Green's Greatest Hits, Volume II (1977) and appeared on reissues of his first greatest hits compilation.

== Cover versions ==
- A cover of the song by Earnest Jackson was released as a single on John Fred's Louisiana-based Stone Records in 1973.
- First Choice on their 1973 debut album Armed and Extremely Dangerous
- Motown psychedelic soul group The Undisputed Truth recorded a version of the song for their 1973 album Law of the Land.
- Lee "Scratch" Perry made a cover of "Love and Happiness" retitled as "Jungle Lion" with The Upsetters on the 1974 album Double Seven.
- Graham Central Station on their 1977 album Now Do U Wanta Dance.
- Al Jarreau on his 1979 album Call Me.
- The Amazing Rhythm Aces covered it on their self-titled album and released it as a single in 1979.
- David Sanborn on his 1984 album Straight to the Heart.
- Living Colour on their 1991 EP Biscuits.
- Etta James on her 1992 album The Right Time.
- Morgan Heritage on the 1993 album Gunmen - Music from the Original Motion Picture Soundtrack.
- Toots and the Maytals on 1995 compilation The Collection.
- A surreptitiously recorded live cover by Mr. Lee & the Rearrangers Band was described by Rocktober magazine as "perhaps the most bizarre 45 in Chicago history."
- Marc Broussard on his 2006 album S.O.S.: Save Our Soul.
- Cultura Profética on their 2019 album Sobrevolando.

== See also ==
- Love and Happiness, by Emmylou Harris
