= Fill This World with Love =

Studio album by Ann Peebles
- Released: 1996
- Genres: R&B, soul
- Length: 54:35
- Label: Bullseye Blues
- Producers: Don Bryant, Ann Peebles

Ann Peebles chronology
The Flipside of Ann Peebles (1995)	Fill This World with Love (1996)	The Best of Ann Peebles: The Hi Records Years (1996)

Fill This World with Love is an album by the American musician Ann Peebles, released in 1996. It was her second album for Bullseye Blues. Peebles supported the album with a North American tour, as well as shows in England.

== Production ==
The album was coproduced by Peebles and her husband, Don Bryant, with Paul Brown serving as musical director. Peebles duetted with Bryant on "I Wouldn't Take Nothing for One Moment I've Spent With You". Mavis Staples duetted with Peebles on the title track, which Peebles had first recorded in 1976. The Memphis Horns contributed to the album; Leroy Hodges played bass. Tracks seven to 14 are performed as a medley. The lead track, "I'm Yours", highlighted the sound of a slide guitar.

== Critical reception ==
Professional ratings
Review scores
Source	Rating
AllMusic	2.5/5 stars
The Commercial Appeal	3/4 stars
MusicHound Folk: The Essential Album Guide	3/5 stars
USA Today	3.5/4 stars
The Virgin Encyclopedia of R&B and Soul	3/5 stars

USA Today noted that, "in an era of slickly produced pop divas, it's nice to hear an old-school soul sister who's not afraid to put a little gravel in her voice." The Washington Informer called Peebles "one of the strongest R&B/soul singers still around." The Tennessean praised the "old-school, Memphis-style R&B." The Independent determined that the album combines the Hi Rhythm Section style "with more modern, funkier sounds," writing that "Bryant has lost little of his song-writing ability."

The Nashville Banner concluded that "Peebles has always been one of the subtlest of soul singers, blending and twisting notes only when it makes sense in the context of the song." The Times-Picayune labeled Fill This World with Love "another collection of classic soul." The Nashville Scene wrote that the album "dips deeper into gospel-style vocal testifying while kicking the music into tougher blues-rock grooves."

== Track listing ==
No.	Title	Writer(s)	Length
1.	"I'm Yours"	Ann Peebles; Paul Brown; Don Bryant	5:03
2.	"Fill This World with Love" (duet with Mavis Staples)	Peebles; Bryant	6:03
3.	"When I'm Over You"	Peebles; Brown; Bryant	5:14
4.	"Stand Up" (duet with Mavis Staples)	Peebles; Brown; Bryant	5:44
5.	"Friends" (duet with Don Bryant)	Peebles; Brown; Bryant	3:51
6.	"I Don't Think That I Can Last Tonight"	Peebles; Brown; Bryant	5:22
7.	"Fired Up"	Peebles; Brown; Bryant	2:53
8.	"Walk Away"	Oliver Sain	1:45
9.	"Give Me Some Credit Where It's Due"	Carl William Smith	2:27
10.	"I'd Rather Leave While I'm in Love"	Peter Allen; Carole Bayer Sager	2:45
11.	"I Pity the Fool"	Joe Medwick	1:35
12.	"Bip Bam Thank You Ma'Am"	Raymond Moore; George Jackson; Raymond Settle	2:02
13.	"Ninety-Nine Pounds"	Bryant	1:21
14.	"One Way Street"	Peebles; Bryant	3:19
15.	"I Wouldn't Take Nothing for One Moment I've Spent with You" (duet with Don Bryant)	Peebles; Bryant	5:11
Total length:			54:35
