= Here I Am (Come and Take Me) =

1973 song by Al Green

Single by Al Green

from the album Call Me
- B-side: "I'm Glad You're Mine"
- Released: June 1973
- Recorded: 1972
- Genre: Soul
- Length: 4:14
- Label: Hi Records
- Songwriters: Al Green; Mabon Hodges
- Producers: Al Green, Willie Mitchell

Al Green singles chronology
"Call Me (Come Back Home)" (1973)	"Here I Am (Come and Take Me)" (1973)	"Livin' for You" (1973)

"Here I Am (Come and Take Me)" is a 1973 song by Al Green, the second single released from his album Call Me. The song reached number 10 on the Billboard Hot 100 and number two on the Hot Soul Singles chart. It was certified as a gold record by the Recording Industry Association of America. A 1990 cover by British reggae-pop band UB40 reached number seven on the Billboard Hot 100.

== Composition and recording ==
Green wrote "Here I Am (Come and Take Me)" with Teenie Hodges, with whom he also collaborated in writing "Take Me to the River," "Love and Happiness," "Full of Fire," and other songs. It was produced by Willie Mitchell in the 1972 recording session for the album Call Me.

== Chart performance ==
Hi Records released the song as a single in June 1973, with "I'm Glad You're Mine" on the B-side. It was the second single from Call Me, after the title track. The record reached number 10 on the US Billboard Hot 100 and received a gold certification, having sold more than 500,000 copies.

=== Weekly charts ===
Chart (1973)	Peak position
Canada Top Singles (RPM)	67
US Billboard Hot 100	10
US Hot R&B/Hip-Hop Songs (Billboard)	2

=== Year-end charts ===
Chart (1973)	Position
US Billboard Hot 100	63

== Certifications ==
Region	Certification	Certified units/sales
United States (RIAA)	Gold	1,000,000^{^}
^{^} Shipments figures based on certification alone.

== UB40 version ==
"Here I Am (Come and Take Me)"

Single by UB40

from the album Labour of Love II
- B-side: "Crisis"
- Released: January 15, 1990
- Genre: Reggae
- Length: 4:00
- Label: DEP International
- Songwriters: Al Green; Mabon Hodges
- Producer: UB40

UB40 singles chronology
"The Way You Do the Things You Do" (1990)	"Here I Am (Come and Take Me)" (1990)	"Impossible Love" (1991)

In 1990, British reggae-pop band UB40 released a cover of "Here I Am (Come and Take Me)" as the second single from their ninth studio album, Labour of Love II, in January 1990. It stalled at number 46 on the UK Singles Chart but proved to be more successful elsewhere, peaking at number three in Australia, number six in New Zealand, and number seven on the US Billboard Hot 100. In Australia, it placed at number 24 on the 1991 year-end chart, while in the United States, it was ranked number 72 on the 1991 year-end chart.

=== Charts ===
==== Weekly charts ====
Chart (1990–1991)	Peak position
Australia (ARIA)	3
Belgium (Ultratop 50 Flanders)	34
Canada Top Singles (RPM)	43
Europe (Eurochart Hot 100)	73
France (SNEP)	14
Ireland (IRMA)	22
Netherlands (Dutch Top 40)	8
Netherlands (Single Top 100)	9
New Zealand (Recorded Music NZ)	6
UK Singles (Official Charts)	46
US Billboard Hot 100	7
US Adult Contemporary (Billboard)	44
US Alternative Airplay (Billboard)	6

==== Year-end charts ====
Chart (1990)	Position
Netherlands (Dutch Top 40)	75
Chart (1991)	Position
Australia (ARIA)	24
US Billboard Hot 100	72

=== Certifications ===
Region	Certification	Certified units/sales
Australia (ARIA)	Gold	35,000^{^}
New Zealand (RMNZ)	Platinum	30,000^{‡}
^{^} Shipments figures based on certification alone.^{‡} Sales+streaming figures based on certification alone.

=== Release history ===
Region	Date	Format(s)	Label(s)	Ref.
United Kingdom	January 15, 1990	—N/a	DEP International	
Australia	March 19, 1990	7-inch vinyl; 12-inch vinyl; cassette	DEP International; Virgin	
Australia (re-release)	July 29, 1991	CD; cassette	Virgin	

== Other cover versions ==
The song has also been covered by such performers as Michael Jackson, Etta James, and Seal. Several reggae versions have been recorded, including by Marcia Griffiths, Pluto Shervington, Owen Gray, and Inner Circle.
