= Back in the Game =

Back in the Game may refer to:

- Back in the Game (2013 TV series), a 2013 American comedy television series that aired on ABC
- Back in the Game (2019 TV series), a 2019 American entrepreneurial television series broadcast on CNBC
- "Back in the Game" (The Suite Life of Zack and Cody episode)
- Back in the Game (Chad Brownlee album), 2019
- Back in the Game (Syl Johnson album), 1994
- "Back in the Game" (song), a 2025 song by Mark Pritchard and Thom Yorke
- "Back in the Game", a 2024 song by Collar

== See also ==
- The Back in the Game Tour
