= Take Me to the River =

Song written by Al Green and Mabon "Teenie" Hodges

Song by Al Green

from the album Al Green Explores Your Mind
- Released: October 2, 1974
- Recorded: 1974, Memphis, Tennessee
- Genre: Soul; R&B; gospel
- Length: 3:45
- Label: Hi
- Songwriters: Al Green; Mabon "Teenie" Hodges
- Producer: Willie Mitchell

Audio video
- "Take Me to the River" on YouTube

"Take Me to the River" is a 1974 song written by American singer Al Green and guitarist Mabon "Teenie" Hodges. Hit versions were recorded by Syl Johnson, Talking Heads, and Delbert McClinton. In 2004, Green's original version was ranked number 117 on Rolling Stone magazine's list of the 500 Greatest Songs of All Time. Green's 1974 recording was inducted into the Grammy Hall of Fame in 2011.

== Recording and writing ==
Al Green originally recorded the song for his 1974 album, Al Green Explores Your Mind, produced by Willie Mitchell and featuring musicians Charles, Leroy and Mabon "Teenie" Hodges (of The Hodges Brothers), drummer Howard Grimes, and the Memphis Horns. Green and Mabon Hodges wrote the song while staying in a rented house at Lake Hamilton, Arkansas, for three days in 1973 in order to come up with new material. According to Mitchell, Green wrote the words and Green and Hodges wrote the tune together. Green dedicated his performance on the record to "...Little Junior Parker, a cousin of mine, he's gone on but we'd like to kinda carry on in his name." According to one writer, "Green's song squares the singer's early religious convictions with more earthly interests", but when the singer became a pastor of the Full Gospel Tabernacle Church in 1976, he dropped the song from his repertoire.

Writing in The Independent in 1994, Tim de Lisle wrote: "Musically, it was much like any other track sung by Green and produced by Willie Mitchell, the Southern-soul maestro who ran Hi Records, the Memphis Horns and the Memphis Strings: R'n'B with lashings of subtlety, a light, easy, late-night sound, in which the strings, the horns, the organ, the guitars and that wild-honey voice blend into a single swinging, winning thing. It doesn't sound like a band playing: it sounds like a lot of instruments humming."

The song was released as a single in the U.S. in 1982, in the "Motown Yesteryear Series".

== Reception and legacy ==
Al Green also used the title Take Me to the River for his autobiography, published in 2000.

In 2004, Green's original recording was ranked number 117 on Rolling Stone's list of the 500 greatest songs of all time. The song was used as the title track of the award-winning 2008 compilation album Take Me to the River: A Southern Soul Story 1961–1977.

In 1999, the tune was used in the popular animatronic singing toy "Big Mouth Billy Bass". This recording sung by Steve Haas was arranged and produced for the toy's manufacturers, Gemmy Industries. According to Teenie Hodges, he made more money in royalties from that version than from any other recording of the song.

The song played a prominent role in two episodes of the HBO series The Sopranos, by way of the Big Mouth Billy Bass. It was also used in the 2026 Academy Award Nominated Short Film The Singers, the 1993 movie Blood In Blood Out and also featured in the 1991 film The Commitments, sung on stage by the group of the same name.

In June 2026, CBS News included the song in its list of the 250 essential American songs of the past 250 years.

== Personnel ==
- Al Green – vocals
- Mabon "Teenie" Hodges – guitar
- Leroy Hodges – bass guitar
- Charles Hodges – Hammond organ, piano
- Howard Grimes – drums, congas
- Archie Turner, Michael Allen – piano
- Andrew Love, Ed Logan – tenor saxophone
- James Mitchell – baritone saxophone, string arrangements
- Wayne Jackson – trumpet
- Jack Hale, Sr. – trombone
- The Memphis Strings – strings

== Other noteworthy renditions ==
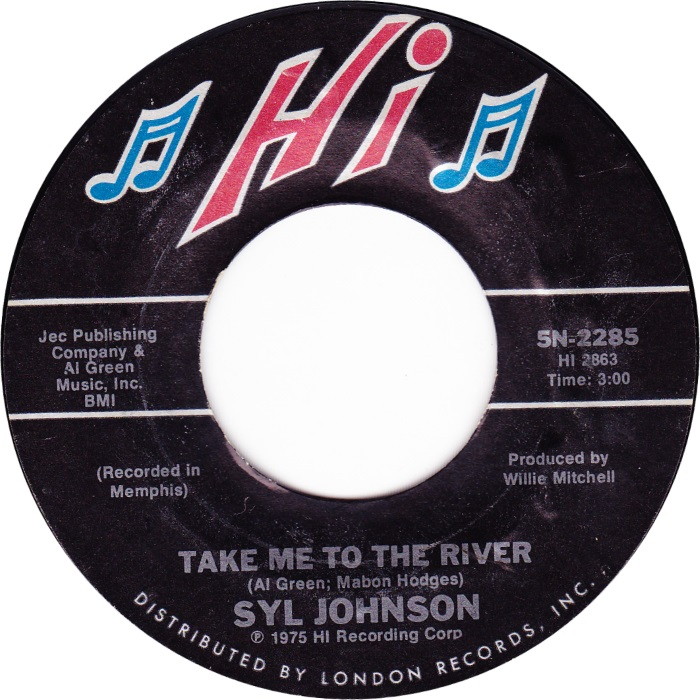
U.S. vinyl single of the Syl Johnson version

The record company, Hi Records, did not release Green's track as a single, but instead passed the song to his labelmate, Syl Johnson. Johnson's recording of the song, also produced by Willie Mitchell and featuring most of the same musicians as on Green's version, but with additional harmonica and a grittier vocal performance, reached #48 on the US Billboard Hot 100 in 1975, and #7 on the U.S. Billboard R&B chart, but reached just #95 in Canada.

"Take Me to the River" has also been notably recorded and performed by other artists:

- Rock band Foghat recorded the song for their 1976 album Night Shift.
- In 1978, Levon Helm and Bryan Ferry re-recorded it separately for their own solo albums, Levon Helm and The Bride Stripped Bare, respectively.
- The Grateful Dead performed the song live four times during the 1995 tour, the first time on April first, at the Pyramid in Memphis (home of Rev Al Green, writer of this song).
- Hootie & the Blowfish and a gospel choir backed Green live at the sixth annual Billboard Music Awards (1995).
- The Dave Matthews Band performed the song live at Chicago's Soldier Field football stadium during the 1999 winter acoustic tour.
- Bruce Springsteen and the E Street Band performed the song alongside several other songs as part of the 20-minute live performance of "Tenth Avenue Freeze-Out" at the 1999 Detroit concert during the 1999–2000 Reunion Tour.
- In 2014, Mavis Staples and Sam Moore performed the song with a gospel choir at the 37th Kennedy Center Honors, where Green was an honoree recipient.
- Courtney Love recorded the song for the Empire episode, "Out, Damned Spot" (2015).
- In 2024, Lorde released a cover of the song as a single for the Talking Heads tribute album Everyone's Getting Involved: A Tribute to Talking Heads' Stop Making Sense.

=== Talking Heads version ===
"Take Me to the River"

Single by Talking Heads

from the album More Songs About Buildings and Food
- B-side: "Thank You for Sending Me an Angel"
- Released: June 30, 1978
- Genre: New wave; soul
- Length: 5:01
- Label: Sire
- Songwriters: Al Green; Mabon "Teenie" Hodges
- Producers: Brian Eno; Talking Heads

Talking Heads singles chronology
"Pulled Up" (1978)	"Take Me to the River" (1978)	"Life During Wartime" (1979)

Music video
- "Take Me to the River" (2005 Remaster) on YouTube

The band Talking Heads recorded the song for their second album More Songs About Buildings and Food (1978). Their version, recorded with co-producer Brian Eno in Nassau, Bahamas, was initially resisted by Byrne who felt the band should not release a cover. Eventually convinced, Eno suggested that they play the song as slow as possible, before adding his own effects to it. The song was edited and released as a single, and reached #26 on the US Billboard Hot 100 in February 1979, as well as hitting the singles charts in Canada, Australia, and New Zealand. Thomas Ryan wrote of Talking Heads' version that it "broadsided the status quo by combining the best ingredients of conventional pop music and classic soul music, stirring them together, and then presenting the mix in the guise of punk rock."

In the liner notes for Once in a Lifetime: The Best of Talking Heads, singer David Byrne writes: "Coincidence or conspiracy? There were at least four cover versions of this song out at the same time: Foghat, Bryan Ferry, Levon Helm, and us. More money for Mr Green's full gospel tabernacle church, I suppose. A song that combines teenage lust with baptism. Not equates, you understand, but throws them in the same stew, at least. A potent blend. All praise the mighty spurtin' Jesus." Live versions were included on Talking Heads' albums The Name of This Band Is Talking Heads and Stop Making Sense. A live version was played at the end credits of the 1998 film A Civil Action.

The track was remastered when Warner Music Group re-released and remastered the album in 2005, on its Warner Bros., Sire and Rhino Records labels in DualDisc format. The DVD-Audio side includes both stereo and 5.1 surround high resolution (96 kHz/24bit) mixes. The reissue was produced by Andy Zax with Talking Heads.

==== Charts ====
Chart (1978–1979)	Peak position
Australian Singles Chart	58
Canadian Singles Chart	34
New Zealand Singles Chart	20
US Billboard Hot 100	26

==== Certifications ====
Region	Certification	Certified units/sales
New Zealand (RMNZ)	Platinum	30,000^{‡}
^{‡} Sales+streaming figures based on certification alone.
