= Full Time Love =

Studio album by Ann Peebles
- Released: 1992
- Genre: Soul, R&B
- Label: Bullseye Blues
- Producer: Ron Levy

Ann Peebles chronology
Call Me (1989)	Full Time Love (1992)	Fill This World with Love (1996)

Full Time Love is an album by the American musician Ann Peebles, released in 1992. Peebles supported the album by touring with Otis Clay.

== Production ==
The album was produced by Ron Levy. It marked a reunion between Peebles and the Hi Rhythm Section; the Memphis Horns also played on the album. About half the album's songs were cowritten by Peebles. Peebles, working with her husband, Donald Bryant, wrote mostly in the studio, choosing to concentrate on positive topics.

== Critical reception ==
Professional ratings
Review scores
Source	Rating
AllMusic	3/5 stars
Robert Christgau	(2-star Honorable Mention)
The Encyclopedia of Popular Music	3/5 stars
MusicHound R&B: The Essential Album Guide	3/5 stars

The Orlando Sentinel wrote that Levy "gives the album a bluesier feel than Peebles' old albums, and she shows plenty of blues feeling on Robert Ward's 'Fear No Evil' and Delbert McClinton's 'Read Me My Rights', a number floating on a wash of organ chords and embellished with horns and gospel-style piano." Rolling Stone thought that "Peebles's small but steely voice has grown stronger, richer and more sinuous in the twenty-odd years since her last album."

USA Today praised the "yearning reinterpretation of the Rolling Stones' 'Miss You' and [the] stark reprise of 'I Can't Stand the Rain'." The Toronto Star called Peebles "like Tina Tuner without the raunch." The Washington Post said that the songs "possess the same horn-driven sound that defined Memphis soul in the early '70s."

AllMusic wrote: "Gritty, unpretentious and hard-hitting, this magnificent date throws pop and urban contemporary considerations to the wind and screams 'Memphis soul' in no uncertain terms."

== Track listing ==
No.	Title	Length
1.	"Bouncin' Back"
2.	"St. Louis Woman (With a Memphis Melody)"
3.	"Read Me My Rights"
4.	"Full Time Lover"
5.	"Fear No Evil"
6.	"Nobody but You"
7.	"Ain't No Business Like Your Business"
8.	"I Miss You"
9.	"Just You Just Me"
10.	"He's My Superman"
11.	"I Can't Stand the Rain"
