= I Can't Stand the Rain =

I Can't Stand the Rain may refer to:

- I Can't Stand the Rain (album), a 1974 album by Ann Peebles; title song written by Don Bryant, Bernard "Bernie" Miller, and Ann Peebles
- "I Can't Stand the Rain" (song), a 1973 song from the album, notably covered by Eruption, Tina Turner, Seal and others
- I Can't Stand the Rain (song), a 2019 song from the extended play SuperM by SuperM

== See also ==
"Stand the Rain", a song by G Herbo from the album, 25
