= Breaking Up Somebody's Home =

R&B song

Single by Ann Peebles

from the album Straight from the Heart
- B-side: "Trouble, Heartaches & Sadness"
- Released: 1972
- Studio: Hi
- Genre: R&B
- Songwriters: Al Jackson Jr., Timothy Matthews
- Producer: Willie Mitchell

Ann Peebles singles chronology
| "Slipped, Tripped and Fell In Love" (1971) | "Breaking Up Somebody's Home" (1972) | "Somebody's on Your Case" (1972) |

"Breaking Up Somebody's Home" (titled "I Feel Like Breaking Up Somebody's Home Tonight" for the album version) is a song written by Al Jackson Jr. and Timothy Matthews, originally recorded by Ann Peebles for her 1971 album Straight from the Heart. It was a successful single for Albert King and was later performed by Bette Midler, Etta James, Gov't Mule, Bob Seger and the Silver Bullet Band, and others.

== Ann Peebles version ==
"Breaking Up Somebody's Home" appeared on Peebles' third studio album, Straight from the Heart in 1971 as "I Feel Like Breaking Up Somebody's Home Tonight". She released it as a single under the shortened, more common title, "Breaking Up Somebody's Home" the same year. This version peaked at No. 13 on Billboard's Hot R&B/Hip-Hop Songs chart but failed to make the Billboard Hot 100. The song was produced by Willie Mitchell, Peebles' long-time collaborator at Hi Records.

Peebles also performed the song on her 2022 live album Live in Memphis, which was recorded on February 7, 1992, at the Peabody Hotel. She was accompanied by the Hi Rhythm Section. The album was released by Memphis International Records.

== Albert King version ==
"Breaking Up Somebody's Home"

Single by Albert King

from the album I'll Play the Blues for You
- B-side: "Little Brother (Make a Way)"
- Released: 1972
- Recorded: 1972
- Studio: Stax
- Genre: Funk, Soul, Blues
- Length: 3:35
- Songwriters: Al Jackson Jr., Timothy Matthews
- Producers: Allen Jones, Henry Bush

Albert King singles chronology
| "I'll Play the Blues for You" (1972) | "Breaking Up Somebody's Home" (1972) | "Playing on Me" (1973) |

Albert King covered "Breaking Up Somebody's Home" for his album I'll Play the Blues for You and released it as a single in 1972. It was produced by Allen Jones and Henry Bush for Stax Records. It peaked at No. 91 on the Billboard Hot 100 and at No. 35 on the Hot R&B/Hip-Hop Songs chart.

== Other versions ==
| Year | Artist | Album | Notes |
|---|---|---|---|
| 1972 | Denise LaSalle | On the Loose | |
| 1973 | Bette Midler | Bette Midler | |
| 1975 | B.B. King | Lucille Talks Back | |
| 1977 | Phillip Walker | Someday You'll Have These Blues | |
| 1978 | Jimmy Johnson Blues Band | Living Chicago Blues, Volume 1 | |
| 1982 | Lurrie Bell & Billy Branch | Chicago's Young Blues Generation | |
| 1982 | Lynn White | Blues in My Bedroom | |
| 1984 | Johnny Adams | From the Heart | |
| 1988 | Etta James | Seven Year Itch | |
| 1988 | Betty Padgett | Sweet Feeling | |
| 1990 | Marva Wright | Heartbreakin' Woman | |
| 1991 | Backbone Slip | Swamp Water | |
| 1992 | Pepe Ahlqvist H.A.R.P | Honey Hush! | |
| 1992 | Jim Kahr | Back to Chicago | |
| 1993 | Big Mama & The Blues Messengers | Big Mama & The Blues Messengers | Live |
| 1993 | Joey Gilmore | Can't Kill Nothin' | |
| 1994 | Barrelhouse | Fortune Changes | |
| 1994 | Bernard Allison | No Mercy | |
| 1994 | Caledonia Blues Band | Alameda Sessions | |
| 1995 | Bonnie Lee | Sweetheart of the Blues | |
| 1999 | Scott Holt | Dark of the Night | |
| 2000 | Carl Weathersby | Come to Papa | |
| 2002 | Rory Block | I'm Every Woman | |
| 2006 | Eddie Taylor Jr. | Mind Game | |
| 2007 | Don Pollard | Covered | |
| 2009 | Kate Pazakis | Unzipped: Live at the Zipper | Live |
| 2010 | Magic Slim and The Teardrops | Raising the Bar | |
| 2012 | Brooklyn Soul Stew | Abandoned Tracks | |
| 2012 | Sven Zetterberg | Mileage | |
| 2013 | Guillaume Petite & Blues Connexion | Des hauts et des bas | |
| 2013 | Kara Grainger | Shiver & Sigh | |
| 2014 | Matt Schofield | Far as I Can See | |
| 2014 | Jay Boy Adams & Zenobia | How Long How Long | |
| 2014 | Kenny Wayne Shepherd ft. Warren Haynes | Goin' Home | |
| 2015 | Danielle Nicole | Wolf Den | |
| 2015 | Gov't Mule featuring John Scofield | Sco-Mule | Live, Recorded 1999 |
| 2016 | Joe Bonamassa | Live at the Greek Theatre | Live |
| 2017 | Sherman Holmes | Sherman Holmes Sessions | |
| 2018 | Lisa Bassenge | Borrowed and Blue | |
| 2021 | Gov't Mule | Heavy Load Blues | |
| 2022 | Ann Peebles | Live in Memphis | Live, Recorded 1992 |

== Charts ==
Ann Peebles
| Chart | Peak position | Ref. |
|---|---|---|
| US Hot R&B/Hip-Hop Songs (Billboard) | 13 | |

Albert King
| Chart | Peak position | Ref. |
|---|---|---|
| US Billboard Hot 100 | 91 | |
| US Hot R&B/Hip-Hop Songs (Billboard) | 35 | |
