= Finger Lickin' Good =

Finger Lickin' Good may refer to:

- "It's Finger Lickin' Good!", a slogan of KFC
- Finger Lickin' Good, a 1967 album by Lonnie Smith
- Finger Lickin' Good, a 1975 album by Dennis Coffey
- "Finger Lickin' Good", a song by Beastie Boys from the 1992 album Check Your Head
- "Finger Lickin' Good", a song by Brecker Brothers from the 1977 album Don't Stop the Music (Brecker Brothers album)
- "Finger Lickin' Good", a song by Syl Johnson from the 1999 album Talkin' About Chicago
- "Finger Lickin' Good", a track on the 1973 album Giants of the Organ Come Together by Jimmy McGriff and Groove Holmes
- "Finger Lickin’ Goofs", a 2000 episode of the Nickelodeon cartoon The Angry Beavers.
- Finger Lickin Good, an Adelaide hip hop group of Quro with MC Madcap
- "Finger Lickin' Good", a 2020 episode of TV series 68 Whiskey

== See also ==
- Finger Lickin' Fifteen
- Finger Lickin' Records
