= Call Me (Come Back Home) =

- French release picture sleeve

Single by Al Green

from the album Call Me
- B-side: "What a Wonderful Thing Love Is"
- Released: January 30, 1973
- Genre: Soul
- Length: 3:03
- Label: Hi
- Songwriters: Al Green, Al Jackson Jr., Willie Mitchell

Al Green singles chronology
"You Ought to Be with Me" (1972)	"Call Me (Come Back Home)" (1973)	"Here I Am (Come and Take Me)" (1973)

"Call Me (Come Back Home)" (known as simply "Call Me") is a song by Al Green, released in 1973 as a single from his album Call Me. It peaked at number ten on the Billboard Hot 100 and number two on the R&B singles chart. It was certified gold by the RIAA. In Canada it reached number 60.
