= The Notations =

American soul group

The Notations are an American soul group formed at high school in Chicago in the late 1960s.

== Career ==
The group recorded for Tad Records early in their career; at a point in their career, Syl Johnson brought The Notations to Twinight Records (based in Chicago). Their first million-dollar seller was a song produced by Johnson entitled "I'm Still Here." The follow-up single was a song entitled "At The Crossroads," written by group member James Stroud. The original members were Clifford Curry, Lasalle Matthews, and Stroud. The group stayed with Twilight Records until the company closed. In 1973, the group joined Curtom/Gemigo Records, a label owned and operated by Curtis Mayfield.

The new lineup of the group consisted of Clifford Curry, Lasalle Matthews, Bobby Thomas, and Walter Jones. They charted a song entitled "It Only Hurts for a Little While," written by Howard Sanderford. There were follow-up songs: It's Alright, This Feeling (written by Chuck Jackson and Marvin Yancy). There was a cut which charted on the disco side entitled "Think Before You Stop" and a song which did very well overseas entitled "SuperPeople." The group stayed on Curtom/Gemigo until the doors closed in 1979.

Emmett Gardner (the group's manager at the time) took them to Mercury Records with a song entitled "Judy Blue Eyes." They stayed with the label for a year. In 2017 the group consisted of Clifford Curry, Eric Rapier Bryant and Marzette Griffith and in 2017 they released a single produced by Aundre Miller and Jimmy Hudson entitled "Just Your Love." In 2019, The Notations signed a recording contract with Silent Giant Entertainment in Sherman Oaks, Los Angeles. Since 2019, they released new videos and a couple of EPs with old school classic songs including "Daddy's Home," "Be Thankful," "I'm So Proud," "I'm Your Puppet," "Sitting in the Park," "I'll Always Love You," and "In the Morning."

== Discography ==
=== Albums ===
- The Notations (Gemigo Records/Curtom Records, 1975)
- Super People (Sequel Records, 1999; compilation)

=== Singles ===
Year	Title	Chart positions	
Year	Title	U.S. R&B Singles	U.S. Disco Singles
1971	"I'm Still Here"	#26	-
1975	"It Only Hurts for a Little While"	#27	-
1975	"Think Before You Stop"	#93	#4
1976	"Make Me Twice the Man"	#91	
