= L-O-V-E (Love) =

- German release picture sleeve

Single by Al Green

from the album Al Green Is Love
- B-side: "I Wish You Were Here"
- Released: February 19, 1975
- Studio: Royal Recording Studios, Memphis
- Genre: Soul
- Length: 3:03
- Label: Hi Records
- Songwriters: Al Green, Willie Mitchell, Mabon Hodges
- Producer: Willie Mitchell

Al Green singles chronology
"Sha-La-La (Make Me Happy)" (1974)	"L-O-V-E (Love)" (1975)	"Oh Me, Oh My (Dreams in My Arms)" (1975)

"L-O-V-E (Love)" is a 1975 soul single by Al Green. The single was produced by Willie Mitchell, who also co-wrote the song along with Al Green and Mabon Hodges. The single was from the LP Al Green Is Love and continued a string of number one R&B hits throughout the 1970s.

== Chart History ==
"L-O-V-E (Love) was at the top spot on the R&B charts for two weeks and reached #13 on the pop singles chart.
