= Is It Because I'm Black =

Single by Syl Johnson

from the album Is It Because I'm Black
- B-side: "Let Them Hang High"
- Released: September 1969
- Recorded: 1969
- Venue: Chicago
- Genre: R&B; Chicago blues; soul
- Length: 3:18
- Label: Twinight Records 125
- Songwriters: Syl Johnson, Jimmy Jones, Glenn Watts
- Producer: Jimmy Jones

Syl Johnson singles chronology
"Don't Give It Away" (1969)	"Is It Because I'm Black" (1969)	"Concrete Reservation" (1970)

"Is It Because I'm Black" is a song recorded in 1969 by blues and soul singer Syl Johnson. It was co-written by Johnson, record producer Jimmy Jones (James L. Jones), and Glenn Watts. The recording, issued on the Twinight label in September 1969, reached number 11 on the Billboard R&B chart, and number 68 on the Hot 100.

== Background and recording ==
By 1969, Johnson had achieved several modest chart successes with songs on traditional themes of romance and relationships, but his marriage had ended, his established backing band had split up, and he was increasingly motivated by the social and economic challenges of American society. Johnson later said: "After Martin Luther King got killed, I wanted to write a song.... I didn’t want to write no song about hating this people or hating that people... I really didn’t have no vendetta against people. It’s a sympathy song."

He linked up with the musicians who until then had been working for Brunswick Records under producer Carl Davis, before leaving under acrimonious circumstances, and recorded "Is It Because I'm Black" with guitarist John Bishop, bassist Bernard Reed, and drummer Hal "Heavy" Nesbitt. Together with horn players Michael Davis and alto saxist Jerry Wilson, the musicians adopted the group name The Pieces of Peace, and toured with Johnson.

Released on the Twinight label (which had changed its name from Twilight because another company already used the name), the single rose up the R&B charts and pop charts at the end of 1969. Journalist Lanre Bakare wrote: "The main lyric from this song has taken on a life of its own and is a phrase that means so much in the American context. Johnson was from Mississippi and in a similar mould to the Chicago blues men like Junior Wells. You can hear that attitude and the grit in the vocal performance on this song. It’s like he’s giving a sermon in a church, and he’s describing – in metaphor and similes – what it’s like to be black in America." Johnson's obituary referred to the song as "a slow, disconsolate ballad that is among the most affecting of the civil rights era." Robert Pruter described the song as "superbly arranged and produced...[in which] Johnson's plaintive vocals evoked the moodiness of this lamentation over the struggle of being black. The song, however, strangely suggested pride rather than defeatism."

== Impact ==
The single's success led to an extended version becoming the title track on Johnson's 1970 album, described in one source as "the first black concept album", released over a year before Marvin Gaye's What's Going On. However, the album failed to sell in large numbers, which Johnson put down to its lack of marketability to a white audience. The song "Is It Because I'm Black" was later recorded by singers Ken Boothe and Delroy Wilson in Jamaica, and Johnson's recording has been sampled by musicians including the Wu-Tang Clan, and the singer's daughter Syleena Johnson for her song "Color Of My Tears" from her ninth studio album Legacy (2024).

In 2017, in a retrospective review of the enduring influence of the song, The Guardian newspaper wrote, “people loved it then and now because the statement…is such a defiant and proud affirmation…It’s what people have to do when you’re on the outside looking in and trying to figure out your place in a society which doesn’t appear to want you.”
