= Twinight Records =

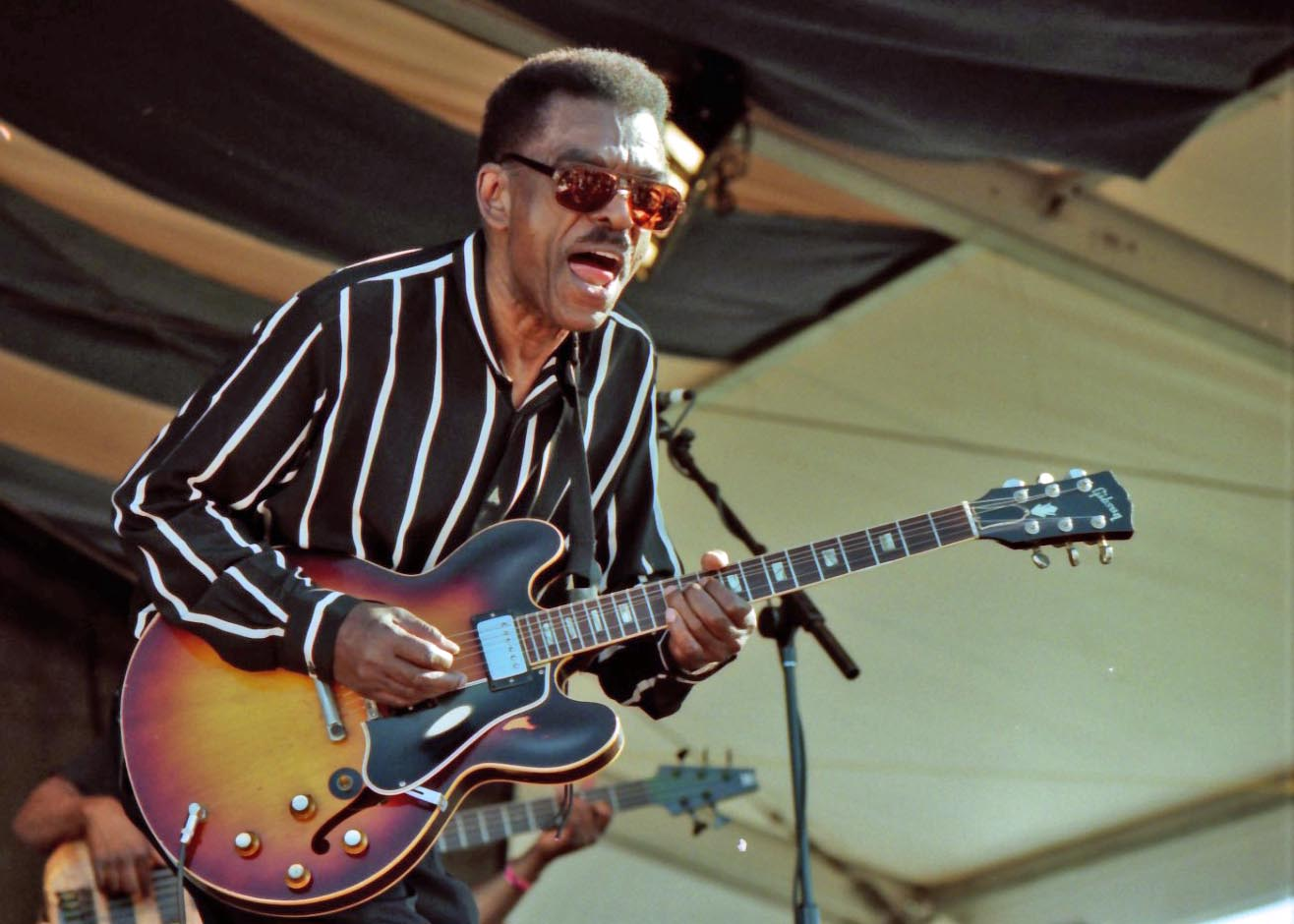
Syl Johnson, the star of Twinight Records and one of the main producers for other acts on the company roster

Twinight Records was a minor American recording label, founded in Chicago 1967 by Howard Bedno and Peter Wright, who later added E. Rodney Jones as a partner. Specializing in R&B and soul music, for a few months the label was called Twilight Records until it was discovered that another company already owned the Twilight name. Over five years, the label released (or at least recorded) 55 singles and charted seven times. The label's star was Syl Johnson, an established R&B performer who had had a number of hits for King Records and who would have his biggest hits for Hi Records in the 1970s.

Johnson's hits at Twinight included "Come on Sock it to Me" (1967), "Sorry ‘Bout Dat", "Different Strokes", "Is It Because I'm Black" (1969), and "Concrete Reservation". Some of these songs were recorded with Willie Mitchell in Memphis, which would later prove the undoing for the company, as Mitchell eventually lured Johnson away to Hi Records in 1971.

The success of Johnson's music permitted the company to scout and record local Chicago talent, making numerous recordings of varying quality. Johnson proved to be an able producer as well as performer, and he often produced the songs on behalf of the company. While many of the artists never went on to later fame, some standout material was produced including singles by Nate Evans (who later joined The Impressions), The Perfections, Velma Perkins (later charting as Vee Allen), Krystal Generation, Johnny Williams, The Notations, The Radiants, and Annette Poindexter. The house band was called Pieces of Peace. Donny Hathaway got his start at Twinight, penning songs for other artists on the roster before moving on to better things.

Except for Johnson's hits, the only other artists to chart were The Notations ("I'm Still Here") and falsetto Renaldo Domino, whose "Not Too Cool to Cry" reached Number 7 on the Chicago R&B charts in 1970. As a rule, the Twinight singles were all relegated to the lunar rotation of late night radio, which virtually guaranteed them a place in everlasting obscurity. Within a few months of Johnson's defection, the label folded early in 1972.

The Twinight name was recently revitalized by Syl Johnson's daughter, the vocalist and songwriter Syleena Johnson, who used the label for some of her early releases.

In 2006, The Numero Group issued a compilation of Twinight recordings.

In 2012, the song "Powerful Love", recorded by Chuck & Mac in 1970, is featured several times in the film Looper.
