= You Ought to Be with Me =

- German release picture sleeve

Single by Al Green

from the album Call Me
- B-side: "What Is This Feeling"
- Released: 1972
- Recorded: 1972
- Genre: Soul
- Length: 3:19
- Label: Hi Records
- Songwriters: Al Green, Al Jackson, Jr, Willie Mitchell
- Producer: Willie Mitchell

Al Green singles chronology
"Guilty" (1972)	"You Ought to Be with Me" (1972)	"Hot Wire" (1973)

"You Ought to Be with Me" is a song by Al Green. Released on his album Call Me, the single spent a week at number one on the Hot Soul Singles chart. It was also successful on the pop chart, peaking at number three on the Billboard Hot 100 singles chart in late 1972. It sold over one million copies and was certified gold by the RIAA.

== Chart positions ==
Charts	Peak position
U.S. Billboard Hot 100	3
U.S. Billboard Hot Soul Singles	1
