= The Lonesome Rhodes =

American singer-songwriter

Sandy and Donna Rhodes are American singers and songwriters who have performed and recorded country music, and were also backing singers on many R&B records made in Memphis, Tennessee, particularly in the 1970s. Coming from a musical family that also included their father "Dusty" Rhodes and uncles "Slim" and "Speck" Rhodes, they recorded as a duo in the 1960s, first as The Rhodes Sisters and later as The Lonesome Rhodes. They also recorded, on their own account and as session musicians, with Sandy's then-husband Charles Chalmers as Rhodes Chalmers Rhodes (RCR). Sandy and Donna have continued to record and perform with family members and associates as The Rhodes Show, which was also the name of the family's earlier radio and television program.

== Background and early years ==
Sandra Irene Rhodes was born in 1947, and her sister Donna Christine Rhodes in 1950. Their father, Perry Hilburn "Dusty" Rhodes (June 5, 1920 – December 1, 2005) played fiddle as a member of the Log Cabin Mountaineers, from the late 1920s, with his brothers Ethmer ("Slim") and Gilbert ("Speck") and sister Bea. The family group toured widely and in the 1930s had their own radio show in Poplar Bluff, Missouri, before moving to Memphis, Tennessee, where both Sandy and Donna were born. Between 1948 and 1975, The Rhodes Show aired on local television in Memphis.

== Sandy and Donna Rhodes ==
Sandy Rhodes had her first success writing "How Much Can a Lonely Heart Stand", a minor hit for Skeeter Davis in 1964 which was also recorded by Sandy and Donna as The Rhodes Sisters. Davis, who discovered the Rhodes sisters, brought them to the attention of RCA Records. The pair then began recording as The Lonesome Rhodes in 1965 releasing five singles and one LP, The Lonesome Rhodes (Sandy and Donna). The recordings were produced by Chet Atkins and Felton Jarvis. With liner notes by Skeeter Davis, the album contained eight songs written by Sandy along with four covers (including songs from contemporary popular / rock songwriters, Boyce & Hart, Bob Dylan and Tom Paxton). During 1966-67, Sandy’s songwriting spanned from contemporary Nashville to songs influenced by the post-1964 Beatles era of popular and rock songwriters. During this period, Sandra also placed five of her songs on two Skeeter Davis LPs (Singin’ in the Summer Sun and What Does It Take (to Keep a Man Like You Satisfied)).

From 1969, the two sisters worked with multi-instrumentalist Charles Chalmers, who was married to Sandy at the time; he also worked as a songwriter and producer with Sandy. Donna Rhodes released an album, I See Love, on Epic Records in 1971, with several songs written and produced by Sandy and Charles Chalmers. Sandra's solo album, Where's Your Love Been, described as "an ambitious mix of soul, country, and rock", was issued by Fantasy Records in 1973, also produced by Sandy and Charles. Her biography on Allmusic describes Sandra Rhodes as "an artist who could walk the fine line between country and Southern soul."

== Rhodes Chalmers Rhodes ==
As a vocal trio, Rhodes Chalmers Rhodes, they recorded as backing singers on many recordings for Hi Records and elsewhere in Memphis during the 1970s, especially by R&B and soul musicians such as Al Green, Ann Peebles, Syl Johnson, Millie Jackson, Candi Staton, Clarence Carter, O V Wright, and others. As Rhodes Chalmers Rhodes (RCR), they released an album of their own, Scandal, in 1980, and had minor hits in the U.S. with the songs "Scandal" and "Give It to You" in the same year. With Wayne Carson, Rhodes, Chalmers and Rhodes wrote Conway Twitty's 1981 hit, "The Clown". In 2003, they backed Al Green on his album I Can't Stop.

== Later activities ==
Chalmers and Sandy Rhodes later divorced. Sandy and Donna Rhodes have continued to perform, with family members and others, as The Rhodes Show.

== Discography ==
Singles:

- "Make Like the Wind (And Blow)" / "Love Is" (October 1966)
- "The Least You Could Have Done" / "Nothin' But Heartaches Here" (March 1967)
- "The Delight of My Day" / "That's Why" (September 1967)
- "Mister" / "The Day Love Comes (Finding You)" (December 1967)
- "The Lights Of Dallas" / "I'm Missing You" (September 1968)

LPs:

- The Lonesome Rhodes (Sandy and Donna) (April 1967)
