= Full of Fire (song) =

- Dutch release picture sleeve

Single by Al Green

from the album Full of Fire
- B-side: "Could I Be the One"
- Released: 1975
- Recorded: 1975
- Genre: R&B
- Length: 3:25
- Songwriter(s): Al Green, Mabon Hodges, Willie Mitchell

Al Green singles chronology
"Oh Me, Oh My (Dreams in My Arms)" (1975)	"Full of Fire" (1975)	"Let It Shine" (1976)

"Full of Fire" is a 1975 song written by Al Green, Mabon Hodges, Willie Mitchell and recorded by Al Green. The single has a more up-tempo feel than his previous releases and was Green's last of six number ones on the R&B chart. "Full of Fire" also reached number 28 on the Billboard Hot 100 singles chart.

== Chart positions ==
Charts	Peak position
U.S. Billboard Hot 100	28
U.S. Billboard Hot Soul Singles	1
