= Archie Turner (musician) =

American keyboard player and songwriter (born 1946)

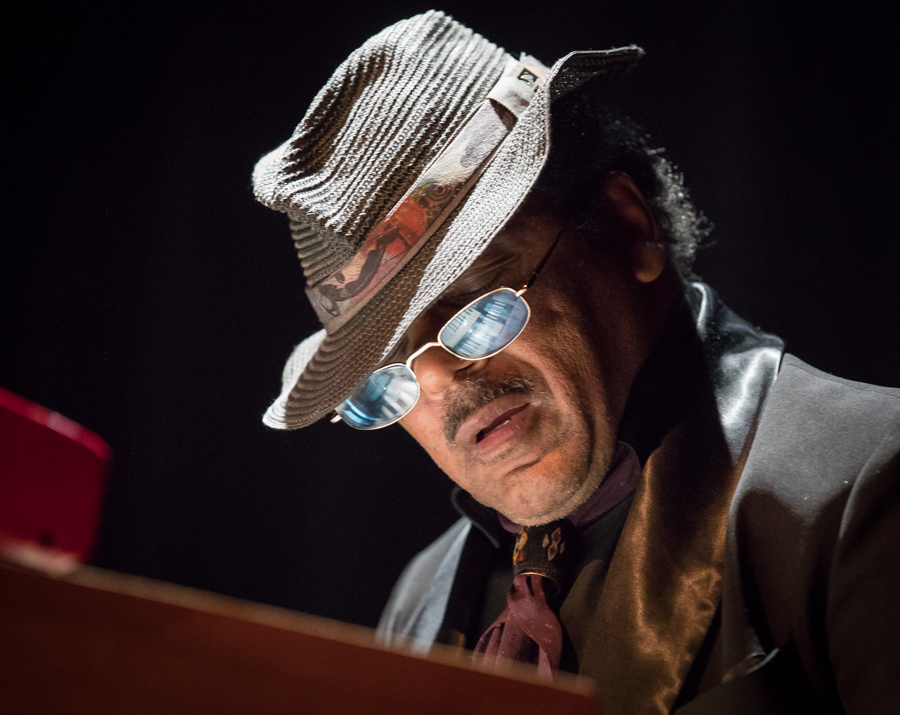
- Archie Turner, 2017

Background information
- Also known as: "Hubbie" Turner
- Born: January 25, 1946 (age 80); Detroit, Michigan, United States
- Origin: Memphis, Tennessee, U.S.
- Genres: Rhythm and blues, funk, rock
- Occupations: Musician, songwriter
- Instrument: Keyboards
- Years active: 1960s–present

Archie "Hubbie" Turner (born January 25, 1946), sometimes known as "Hubbie" Mitchell, is an American keyboard player and songwriter who was a member of the Hi Rhythm Section in Memphis, Tennessee and has featured on over forty albums.

== Biography ==
Turner was born in Detroit, Michigan, the son of Horace Turner Sr., who died when Archie was a young child. He acquired the nickname "Hubbie" (sometimes spelled "Hubby" or "Hubie") in childhood, and moved with his brother Horace to Memphis, where they lived with their grandmother. Archie began taking piano lessons, and then lived with his mother, her second husband – musician Willie Mitchell – and their daughters. He attended a Catholic high school in Memphis, and met brothers Teenie and Leroy Hodges. They soon formed a band, the Impalas, with Archie on keyboards, Horace on drums, and the Hodges brothers on guitar and bass, and played in local clubs and at parties, occasionally substituting for their stepfather Willie Mitchell's own band.

After graduating from high school in 1964, Archie studied at Memphis State College while continuing to play with the Impalas, and occasionally made recordings as a session musician. He dropped out of college, and in 1968 was drafted into the US Army, initially forming a band at Fort Polk, Louisiana with his cousin, Donny Mitchell. He was transported to Vietnam as a member of an infantry unit, eventually forming a band there. He was recognized in Stars and Stripes magazine as 1969 Entertainer of the Year in Vietnam. Returning to Memphis in 1970, he restarted his degree but changed his major to Psychology. He also formed a new rock band, Blackrock, with Cornell McFadden (drums – previously a member of The Insect Trust), Curke Dudley (bass), and Willie Pettis (guitar). They recorded one single, "Blackrock, Yeah, Yeah", for the local Select-O-Hits label, and – with Pettis replaced by Larry Lee – traveled to California where they auditioned for Bill Graham, though nothing came of the session and the band split up in 1971. "Blackrock, Yeah, Yeah", co-written by Turner, was sampled on the 2014 album ...And Then You Shoot Your Cousin by The Roots.

Turner then joined the Hodges brothers in the Hi Rhythm Section, recording over the next few years with Al Green, Syl Johnson, Ann Peebles, Otis Clay and others. He also wrote two tracks on Paul Butterfield's 1981 album North-South, and formed a new band, Quo Jr., with Roland Robinson and Brad Webb. During the 1980s he played in the bands of Little Milton; Bobby 'Blue' Bland, with whom he toured in Europe; and Albert King, where he played with guitarist Emmanuel Gales, later known as Little Jimmy King. Turner and Little Jimmy King then formed the Memphis Soul Survivors, who became the house band at B. B. King's Blues Club on Beale Street and recorded several albums for Rounder Records.

In 2008, Turner joined The Bo-Keys in Memphis. Between 2010 and 2012 he toured internationally as a member of Cyndi Lauper's band, and in 2014 toured as a member of the Hi Rhythm Section backing singer Paul Rodgers. In 2010 he gained a W. C. Handy Heritage Award. He has continued to perform as a member of both the Hi Rhythm Section and the Bo-Keys, as well as with other musicians including Stevie Ray Vaughan, and Earl “The Pearl” Banks and the 'Peoples of the Blues' band.
