= Syl Johnson =

American blues and soul singer (1936–2022)

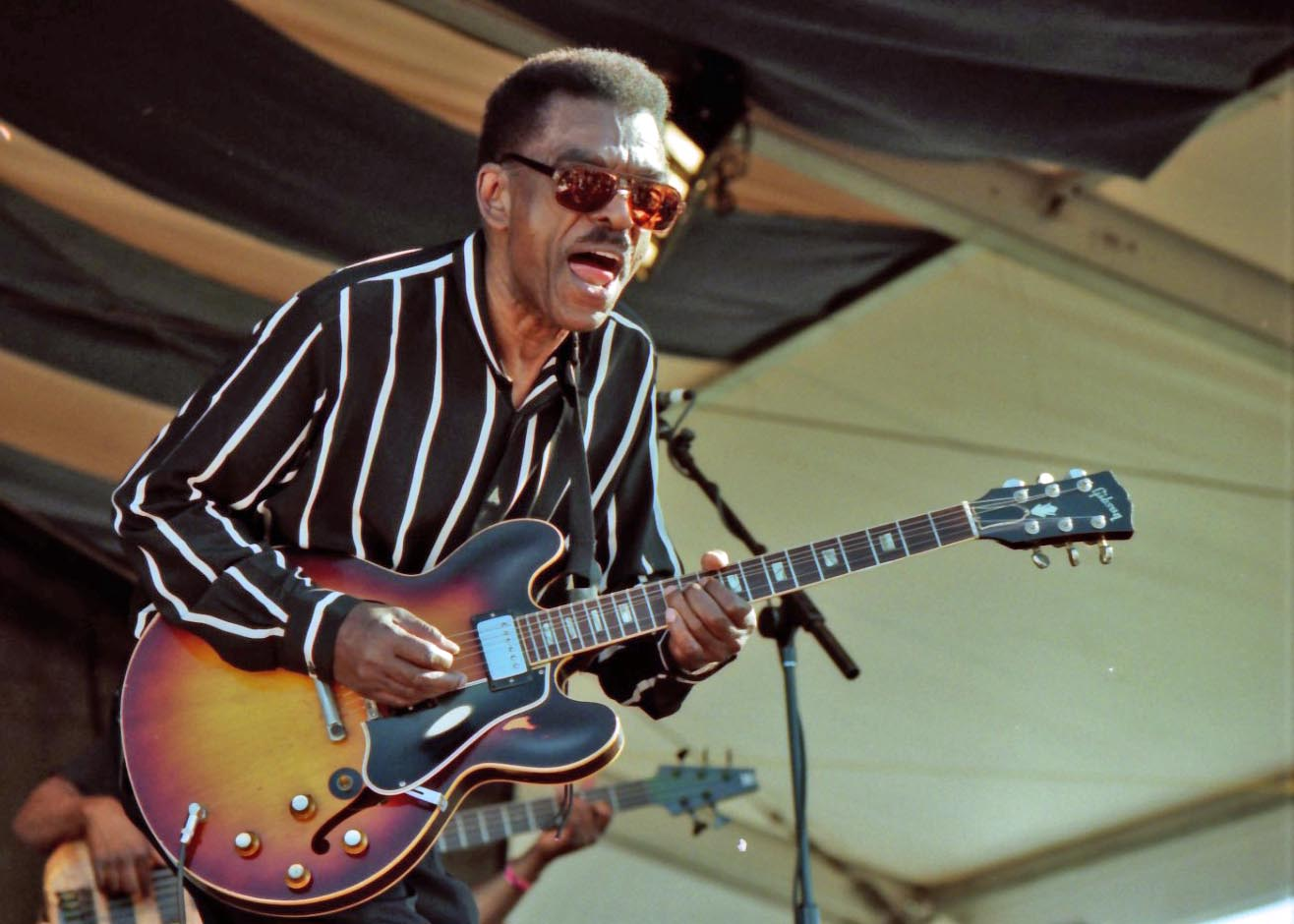
- Johnson at the 1997; New Orleans Jazz & Heritage Festival
- Born: Sylvester Thompson; July 1, 1936; Holly Springs, Mississippi, U.S.
- Died: February 6, 2022 (aged 85); Mableton, Georgia, U.S.
- Occupations: Musician; singer; songwriter; record producer
- Years active: 1959–2022
- Children: Syleena Johnson (daughter)
- Relatives: Jimmy Johnson (brother)
- Musical career
- Genres: R&B; blues; soul
- Instruments: Vocals; guitar; harmonica
- Labels: Federal; Twilight/Twinight; Hi; Boardwalk; Delmark; Hep-Me; Evangeline

Sylvester Johnson (born Sylvester Thompson; July 1, 1936 – February 6, 2022) was an American blues and soul singer, musician, songwriter and record producer. His most successful records included "Different Strokes" (1967), "Is It Because I'm Black" (1969) later covered by reggae artists Ken Boothe and Delroy Wilson, and "Take Me to the River" (1975), a cover of Al Green's 1974 original.

== Biography ==
=== Early life and recording debut ===
Born near Holly Springs, Mississippi, the sixth child of a harmonica-playing farmer, he moved with his family in about 1950 to Chicago, where blues guitarist Magic Sam was his next-door neighbor. Johnson sang and played with Magic Sam and other blues artists, such as Billy Boy Arnold, Junior Wells and Howlin' Wolf, in the 1950s. He recorded with Jimmy Reed for Vee-Jay in 1959, and – after label owner Syd Nathan suggested he change his name from Thompson to Johnson – made his solo debut that same year with "Teardrops" on Federal, a subsidiary of King Records of Cincinnati, backed by Freddie King on guitar. However, Johnson's recordings for King and Federal met with little success, and he also kept a day job as a truck driver.

=== 1960s: Career at Twinight Records ===
After several years of recording for small local labels, and performing regularly in local clubs, Johnson began recording for Twilight/Twinight of Chicago in the mid-1960s. Beginning with his first hit, "Come On Sock It to Me", in 1967, he dominated the label as both a hit-maker and a producer. His song "Different Strokes", also from 1967, is included on the breakbeat compilation album, Ultimate Breaks and Beats (SBR 504), and some years later was sampled on many hip hop tracks. Both "Come On Sock It to Me" and "Different Strokes" featured on Johnson's debut LP, Dresses Too Short, in 1968.

Like other black songwriters of the period, Johnson wrote songs exploring themes of African-American identity and social problems, such as "Is It Because I'm Black", which reached number 11 on the Billboard R&B chart in 1969. The song has been described as "among the most affecting of the civil rights era," and provided the title track of his second album.

=== 1970s: Hi Records and Willie Mitchell ===
In 1971, the producer Willie Mitchell brought Johnson to Hi Records. Together they recorded three albums, which generated a number of singles. Produced in Memphis with the Hi house band, these albums contained the hits "We Did It", "Back for a Taste of Your Love" and "Take Me to the River", his biggest success, reaching number 7 on the R&B chart in 1975, and first recorded as an album track by labelmate Al Green. However, at Hi Records, Johnson was always to some extent in the shadow of Al Green, commercially if not artistically. Mitchell also chose to use mainly in-house compositions rather than Johnson's original songs. According to Robert Pruter, "His output on the label was of a consistently higher quality than his Twinight work. In most respects, the Hi material possessed better melodies, had more rhythmic punch, and was better produced."

Reviewing one of his last albums for Hi, 1976's Total Explosion, Robert Christgau wrote in Christgau's Record Guide: Rock Albums of the Seventies (1981): "Johnson has tended to disappear in between Willie Mitchell and Al Green, but on this LP he takes his harmonica up to the microphone and stands clear as a lapsed bluesman. Good move. His voice is still shriller, and more strained than Green's, but that can be a satisfying distinction in the right context."

=== 1980s: Retirement ===
After his years with Hi ended, Johnson produced two LPs for his own Shama label, the second of which, the soul/funk Ms. Fine Brown Frame (1982), was picked up for distribution by Boardwalk Records. The title track of that album was Johnson's last hit record.

Around the mid-1980s, Johnson mostly retired from performing, making only occasional appearances at blues clubs. At that time, he opened a chain of seafood restaurants, and began investing in real estate.

=== 1990s: Return to music ===
In 1992, Johnson found out that his song "Different Strokes" had been sampled by several rappers, including Wu-Tang Clan, Public Enemy, Kool G Rap, Hammer, De La Soul, and the Geto Boys. This stimulated his interest in making a comeback in the music industry. He recorded the album Back in the Game, released by Delmark Records in 1994, which featured the Hi Rhythm Section and his youngest daughter, Syleena Johnson.

Johnson was one of the most sampled artists, largely from "Different Strokes" and "Is It Because I'm Black". He felt passionately that taking music from an original artist without proper compensation constituted theft, and he sued other artists for copyright infringement.

=== Any Way the Wind Blows documentary ===
The 2015 documentary Any Way the Wind Blows, directed by Rob Hatch-Miller, premiered at the Chicago International Film Festival. It takes its inspiration from events in the life of this "mostly forgotten" (according to Greil Marcus) soul singer from the 1970s seeking a second attempt at a career. While his records were being sampled by artists from Wu-Tang Clan to Kid Rock, to Jay-Z and Kanye West, Johnson often found himself with neither credit nor money.

== Personal life and death ==
Johnson was the brother of blues guitarist and singer Jimmy Johnson and bassist Mack Thompson.

In 2014, he appeared in an episode of the TV One reality series R&B Divas: Atlanta, in which he offered advice and encouragement to his daughter Syleena before she gave a live performance. Johnson and his family appeared on the American reality television series Iyanla: Fix My Life, by the request of his daughter Syleena, to help her mother's alcohol addiction.

He died of congestive heart failure, at the home of one of his daughters, in Mableton, Georgia, on February 6, 2022, at the age of 85, six days after the death of his older brother Jimmy.

== Selected discography ==
=== Albums ===
- 1968: Dresses Too Short (Twinight)
- 1970: Is It Because I'm Black? (Twinight)
- 1973: Back for a Taste of Your Love (Hi)
- 1974: Diamond in the Rough (Hi)
- 1975: Total Explosion (Hi)
- 1979: Uptown Shakedown (Hi)
- 1982: Ms. Fine Brown Frame (Boardwalk 33260)
- 1994: Back in the Game (Delmark)
- 1995: Music to My Ears (Hi)
- 1995: This Time Together by Father and Daughter (Twinight) with Syleena Johnson
- 1995: Bridge to a Legacy (Antone's)
- 1999: Talkin' About Chicago (Delmark)
- 2000: Hands of Time (Hep-Me Records)
- 2002: Two Johnsons Are Better Than One (Evangeline) with Jimmy Johnson
- 2003: Straight Up (P-Vine PCD-25004, Japan)
- 2013: Syl Johnson with Melody Whittle, Featuring Syleena Johnson (Twinight 4086-CD2)
- 2017: My Funky Funky Band (Numero)

=== Compilations ===
- 2000: The Complete Syl Johnson on Hi Records (Demon, UK)
- 2003: Vanthology - A Tribute To Van Morrison (Evidence) (performing Morrison's Jackie Wilson Said)
- 2010: Syl Johnson: Complete Mythology (Numero Group)
- 2012: Backbeats Artists Series: Syl Johnson: Mississippi Mainman (Backbeats)

=== Chart singles ===
Year	Single	Chart Positions			Label
Year	Single	US Pop	US R&B	US CB	Label
1967	"Come On Sock It to Me"	97	12	92	Twilight
1967	"Different Strokes"	95	17	96	Twilight
1968	"Dresses Too Short"	–	36	–	Twinight
1969	"Is It Because I'm Black"	68	11	–	Twinight
1970	"Concrete Reservation"	–	29	–	Twinight
1970	"One Way Ticket to Nowhere"	125	24	–	Twinight
1971	"Get Ready"	–	34	–	Twinight
1972	"The Love You Left Behind"	–	43	–	Hi
1972	"We Did It"	95	23	72	Hi
1973	"Back for a Taste of Your Love"	72	16	74	Hi
1974	"I'm Yours"	–	68	–	Hi
1974	"Let Yourself Go"	–	54	–	Hi
1974	"I Want to Take You Home (to See Mama)"	–	40	–	Hi
1975	"Take Me to the River"	48	7	59	Hi
1975	"I Only Have Love"	–	15	–	Hi
1976	"Star Bright, Star Lite"	–	89	–	Hi
1976	"Bout to Make Me Leave Home"	–	94	–	Hi
1977	"Goodie-Goodie-Good Times"	–	93	–	Shama
1982	"Ms. Fine Brown Frame"	–	60	–	Boardwalk
