= Ann Peebles =

American singer and songwriter (born 1947)

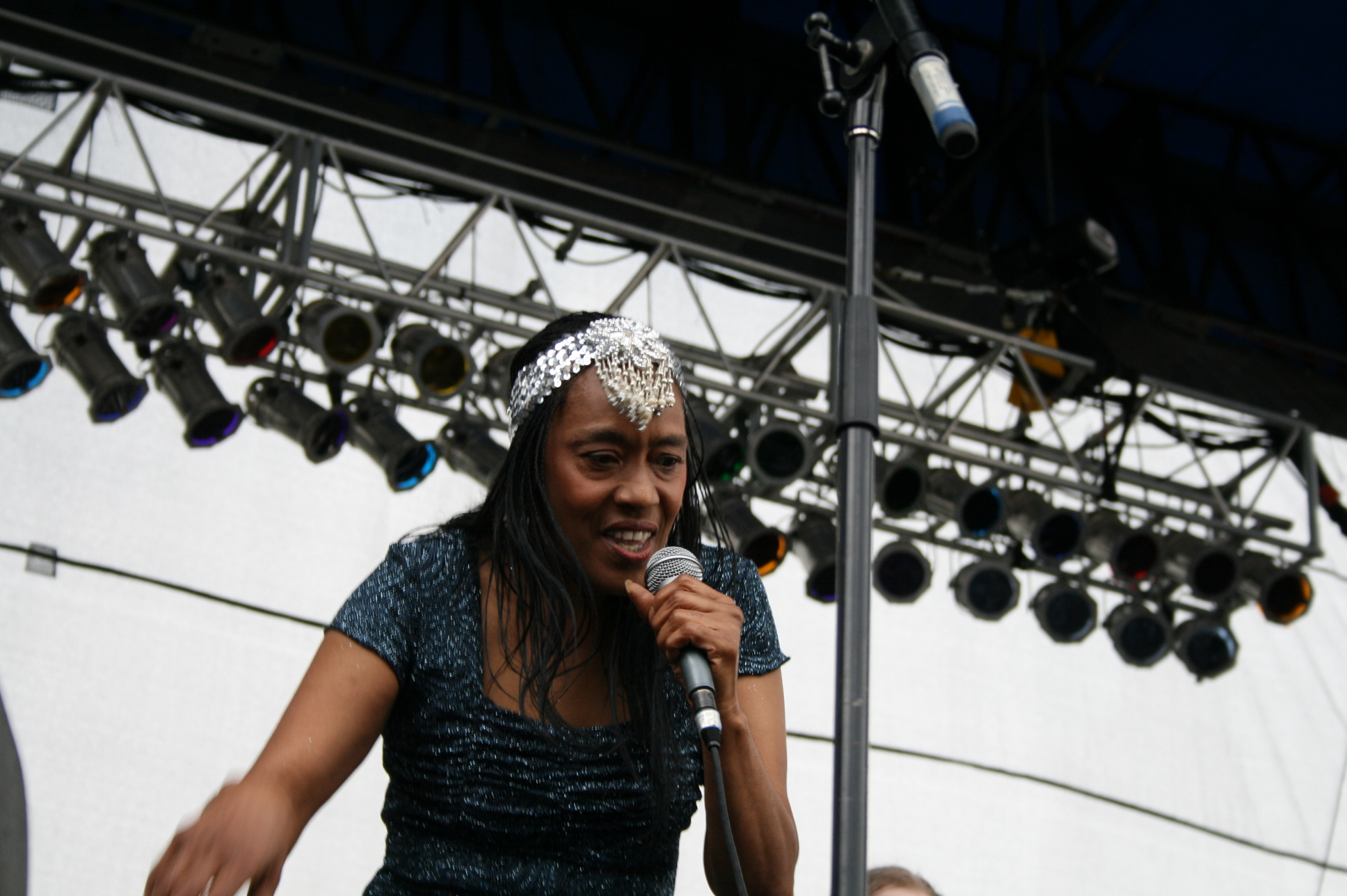
- Peebles (2007)

Background information
- Born: Ann Lee Peebles; April 27, 1947 (age 79); Kinloch, Missouri, U.S.
- Genres: Blues; R&B; Memphis soul
- Occupations: Singer; songwriter
- Instrument: Vocals
- Years active: Mid-1960s - 2012
- Labels: Hi; Bullseye Blues
- Spouse: Don Bryant (m. 1974; died 2025)

Ann Lee Peebles (born April 27, 1947) is a retired American singer and songwriter who gained popularity for her Memphis soul albums of the 1970s while signed to Hi Records. Her most successful singles include "I Can't Stand the Rain," which she wrote with her husband Don Bryant and radio broadcaster Bernie Miller, and "I'm Gonna Tear Your Playhouse Down." In 2014, she was inducted into the Memphis Music Hall of Fame.

== Biography ==
She was born in Kinloch, Missouri, the seventh child of eleven. As a child she began singing in the choir of her father's church and with the family's group, the Peebles Choir, who regularly opened shows for gospel stars including Mahalia Jackson and the Soul Stirrers featuring Sam Cooke. She was also influenced by R&B performers, including Muddy Waters, Mary Wells and Aretha Franklin.

"Why gritty singing like this can't be heard on 'progressive' radio when a borderline hysteric like Lydia Pense is an automatic add ought to be investigated by the Civil Rights Commission."

— Review of Straight from the Heart in Christgau's Record Guide: Rock Albums of the Seventies (1981)

She began performing in clubs in St. Louis, and in the mid-1960s joined a revue led by bandleader Oliver Sain. While visiting Memphis in 1968, she sang in a club with trumpeter Gene "Bowlegs" Miller, a popular local bandleader known for helping other musicians get their start in the Memphis music industry (including the members of the Hi Rhythm Section, who played on Peebles' recordings). Miller introduced her to Hi Records producer Willie Mitchell, who quickly offered her a recording contract.

Her first record, "Walk Away," written by Sain, reached the R&B chart in 1969, as did the follow-up, "Give Me Some Credit," and she released an album, This Is Ann Peebles. All her early records on Hi were produced by Mitchell and featured the signature sound of the Hi Rhythm Section and Memphis Horns. In 1970, her single "Part Time Love," a version of Little Johnny Taylor's 1963 hit, reached no. 7 on the R&B chart, and no.45 on the pop chart, and she began working with the Hi label's songwriter Don Bryant, whom she married in 1974. One of the first songs he wrote for her was "99 Pounds" in 1971.

She continued to have R&B hits in the early 1970s, including "I Pity the Fool," "Slipped, Tripped and Fell in Love," "Breaking Up Somebody's Home" (a Hot 100 hit in 1973 for Albert King and later recorded by Bette Midler), "Somebody's on Your Case," and "I'm Gonna Tear Your Playhouse Down" (later a hit for Paul Young). She was also the only female singer on Hi to release a string of albums, including Straight from the Heart and I Can't Stand the Rain, that contained many tracks that she co-wrote. The title track of the latter album, written by Peebles and Bryant with DJ Bernard Miller, was her biggest commercial success, reaching no. 6 on the R&B chart and no. 38 on the pop chart in 1973.

Although she continued to have hit R&B singles and to release albums on Hi, none matched the success of "I Can't Stand the Rain." Mitchell later said: "She was the girl with the big voice who could have really gone further ... But I don't think Ann spent enough time thinking about what she needed to do. I don't think she put as much energy into her career as a singer as some of the rest of these people." After Hi Records closed in 1979, and with the rise of disco music, Peebles took a break from the music industry to spend more time with her family. She returned in 1989 with the album Call Me, again produced by Willie Mitchell and released on his own Waylo label. During the 1990s, she released albums on Rounder Records' Bullseye Blues subsidiary label. She continued to perform, and in 2006 she released the album Brand New Classics, which consisted of re-recordings of some of her songs in an acoustic style. Peebles also joined Cyndi Lauper on a recording of "Rollin' and Tumblin'" on Lauper's 11th studio album, Memphis Blues. She gave up performing after a stroke in 2012.

== Discography ==
=== Studio albums ===
Year	Title	Peak chart positions		Record label
Year	Title	US	US R&B	Record label
1969	This Is Ann Peebles	—	—	Hi
1971	Part Time Love	—	40	Hi
1971	Straight from the Heart	188	42	Hi
1974	I Can't Stand the Rain	155	25	Hi
1975	Tellin' It	—	41	Hi
1977	If This Is Heaven	—	—	Hi
1979	The Handwriting Is on the Wall	—	—	Hi
1989	Call Me	—	—	Waylo
1992	Full Time Love	—	—	Bullseye Blues
1996	Fill This World with Love	—	—	Bullseye Blues
"—" denotes a recording that did not chart or was not released in that territory.

=== Compilation albums ===
Year	Title	Record label
1988	Ann Peebles' Greatest Hits	MCA
1990	Lookin' for a Lovin	Hi/Demon
1992	Sings Soul CLassics	CEMA Special Markets
1992	Greatest Hits	Hi/Demon
1995	U.S. R&B Hits '69-'79	Hi/Demon
1995	The Flipside of Ann Peebles	Hi/Demon
1996	St. Louis Woman/Memphis Soul	Hi/Demon
1996	The Best of Ann Peebles: The Hi Records Years	The Right Stuff/Capitol
1998	How Strong Is A Woman: The Story of Ann Peebles (1969-80)	Hi/Demon
2002	The Hi Singles A's & B's	Hi/Demon
2003	The Complete Ann Peebles on Hi Records, Volume 1: 1969-1973	Hi/Demon
2003	The Complete Ann Peebles on Hi Records, Volume 2: 1974-1981	Hi/Demon
2006	Original Funk Soul Sister: The Best of Ann Peebles	Music Club
2015	the essential ann peebles	Hi Recording Corp.

=== Live albums ===
Year	Title	Record label
2022 (Recorded 1992)	Live in Memphis	Memphis International Records

=== Singles ===
Year	Title	Peak chart positions				
Year	Title	US	US R&B	AUS	CAN	UK
1969	"Walk Away"	—	22	—	—	—
1969	"Give Me Some Credit"	—	45	—	—	—
1970	"Generation Gap Between Us"	—	—	—	—	—
1970	"Part Time Love"	45	7	—	34	—
1971	"I Pity the Fool"	85	18	—	—	—
1971	"Slipped, Tripped and Fell In Love"	113	42	—	—	—
1972	"Breaking Up Somebody's Home"	101	13	—	—	—
1972	"Somebody's on Your Case"	117	32	—	—	—
1973	"I'm Gonna Tear Your Playhouse Down"	111	31	—	—	—
1973	"I Can't Stand the Rain"	38	6	79	89	41
1974	"(You Keep Me) Hangin' On"	102	37	—	—	54 (Note: Chart position is from the official UK "Breakers List".)
1974	"Do I Need You"	—	57	—	—	—
1974	"Until You Came into My Life"	—	—	—	—	—
1975	"Beware"	—	69	—	—	—
1975	"Come to Mama"	—	62	—	—	—
1976	"Dr. Love Power"	—	57	—	—	—
1976	"I Needed Somebody"	—	—	—	—	—
1976	"Fill This World with Love"	—	96	—	—	—
1977	"If This Is Heaven"	—	64	—	—	—
1978	"Old Man with Young Ideas"	—	54	—	—	—
1978	"I Didn't Take Your Man"	—	55	—	—	—
1979	"If You Got the Time (I've Got the Love)"	—	95	—	—	—
1980	"Heartaches"	—	—	—	—	—
1981	"Mon Belle - Amour" (with Don Bryant)	—	—	—	—	—
"—" denotes a recording that did not chart or was not released in that territory.

== In popular culture ==
Her name appears in the lyrics of the Le Tigre song "Hot Topic".
