= Hi Rhythm Section =

American music group

The Hi Rhythm Section was the house band for hit soul albums by several artists, including Al Green and Ann Peebles, on Willie Mitchell's Hi Records label in the 1970s. The band included the three Hodges brothers, organist Charles Hodges, bassist Leroy Hodges and guitarist Mabon "Teenie" Hodges, together with pianist Archie Turner (or Michael Allen) and drummer Howard Grimes (or Stax Records drummer Al Jackson Jr., on most singles until his death in 1975). Many recordings also used The Memphis Horns - Wayne Jackson and Andrew Love - of Stax fame, usually with Willie's brother James Mitchell arranging and (Perry) Michael Allen - piano (Alt). The recordings were made at producer Willie Mitchell's Royal Recording Studio in Memphis, Tennessee.

== Band history ==
The Hodges brothers began playing together in their father's band, the Germantown Blue Dots, in the late 1950s and early 1960s. Leroy Hodges then formed his own band, The Impalas, and came into contact with Memphis trumpeter and bandleader Willie Mitchell. Younger brother Teenie Hodges, then an aspiring bass player, was unofficially adopted by Mitchell in the mid-1960s, and became a member of his regular band, soon joined by Charles and Leroy. Mitchell also recruited first Al Jackson, and later Howard Grimes, from the Stax house band, and used his stepson Archie Turner as an additional keyboard player.

In the late 1960s, Mitchell and his band cut back on their touring schedule, to focus more on studio work. The Hi Rhythm Section's distinctive, warm, swirling soul sound was a major ingredient in the success of the label through the 1970s. Three members of the Hodges family played guitar, organ and bass for the group; their naturally closeknit, familial warmth brought a unique, intuitive groove to the group's sound. Along with contributions by other outstanding contemporary 1960s and 1970s Memphis studio sessions bands, such as The Mar-Keys, the Packers, and Booker T. & the M.G.'s, the Hi Rhythm Section helped define the sounds of the classic Memphis soul music genre. By the mid-1970s, they had appeared on nearly 20 gold and platinum albums and countless chart hits for Al Green, Ann Peebles, Syl Johnson, Otis Clay and others.

The Hodges brothers, with Grimes, recorded the 1976 LP On the Loose as Hi Rhythm.

The band dissolved after Hi Records was sold in 1977, but regrouped as a touring band in 1979. Through the 1980s and early 1990s, the Hodges brothers toured with singers Albert Collins and Otis Clay, and periodically regrouped with Grimes and Turner. Charles Hodges left in the 1990s, becoming an ordained church minister. In 1994, the album Perfect Gentlemen was released, featuring a fourth Hodges with the addition of Fred on keyboards as well as Percy Wiggins on vocals, issued on Velvet Recordings of America as by The Hodges Brothers.

Other band members still played together, sometimes with Jackson's cousin Steve Potts on percussion, and contributed to recordings by other artists during the 1990s and 2000s. They provided their unique backdrops for Syl Johnson on the Delmark Records CD Back in the Game (1994), and the Mitchell-produced Al Green comeback I Can't Stop and its follow-up for the Blue Note label in 2003 and 2005. They also toured with Cat Power, a.k.a. Chan Marshall, and featured on her 2006 album The Greatest. In 2016, the group was inducted into the Memphis Music Hall of Fame.

Canadian singer Frazey Ford recorded her 2014 album Indian Ocean songs "September Fields" and, "I'm Done", at the Royal Studio, - the Hi Rhythm Section backing her with their unmistakeable signature Memphis sounds.

The Royal Recording Studio in Memphis is now included on the same tour with the landmark studios of Stax and Sun.

== Members ==
- Teenie Hodges – guitar (died 2014)
- Charles Hodges – organ
- Leroy Hodges – bass
- Howard Grimes – drums (died 2022)
- Al Jackson Jr. – drums (died 1975)
- Archie Turner – piano
- (Perry) Michael Allen – piano (Alt)
- James Hooker – piano (a.k.a. James H. Brown Jr.)

== Discography ==
- I Can't Stand the Rain (1974) – Ann Peebles
- On the Loose (1976)
- Soul Man: Live in Japan (1991) - Otis Clay
- Perfect Gentlemen (1994) – recorded as The Hodges Brothers
- Out There Somewhere (2012) – Deering and Down
