= Teenie Hodges =

American guitarist and songwriter (1945–2014)

- Born: Mabon Lewis Hodges; November 16, 1945; Germantown, Tennessee, U.S.
- Died: June 22, 2014 (aged 68) Dallas, Texas, U.S.
- Genres: Rhythm and blues; funk; soul
- Occupations: Musician; songwriter
- Instrument: Guitar
- Years active: 1958–2014
- Formerly of: The Impalas; Hi Rhythm; Al Green

Mabon Lewis "Teenie" Hodges (November 16, 1945 – June 22, 2014) was an American musician known for his work as a rhythm and lead guitarist and songwriter on many of Al Green's soul hits, and those of other artists such as Ann Peebles and Syl Johnson, on Hi Records in the 1970s. His credits as a songwriter include "Take Me to the River", "Love and Happiness", "L-O-V-E (Love)", and "Here I Am (Come and Take Me)". He was the uncle of Canadian rapper and singer Drake.

== Early years ==
Born in Germantown, Tennessee, Hodges began playing guitar at age 12 in his father's band, the Germantown Blue Dots, before joining his brothers Leroy and Charles in their group, the Impalas. He was encouraged by Memphis band leader and record producer Willie Mitchell. Mitchell used Hodges as a central component of the Hi Rhythm Section, which also included Leroy, Charles, drummer Al Jackson Jr., and pianist Archie Turner, Mitchell's stepson. When Jackson left in 1966, Hodges recruited Howard Grimes to replace him.

== Career ==
Two of his compositions, "Take Me to the River" and "Love and Happiness", both co-written with Green, have been covered by numerous other international artists, including Al Jarreau, Amazing Rhythm Aces, Talking Heads, O. V. Wright, David Sanborn, Toots & the Maytals, Canned Heat, Foghat, Levon Helm, Syl Johnson, Annie Lennox, Delbert McClinton, Mitch Ryder, Tom Jones, Graham Central Station, Living Colour, blues artist Willie Cobbs, Denise LaSalle, and others. He also co-wrote several other popular hits with songwriters like Isaac Hayes, Willie Mitchell, and Al Green, including "I Take What I Want," "Oh Me, Oh My," "Here I Am (Come and Take Me)", "L-O-V-E (Love)" and "Full of Fire".

Hodges continued to record and tour as guitarist in the Hi Rhythm Section, often with major soul acts like Syl Johnson and O. V. Wright. The Hodges brothers, with Grimes, recorded the 1976 LP On the Loose, as Hi Rhythm, and in 1994 issued Perfect Gentlemen. He contributed one acoustic song ('Rock Me Baby') to Beale Street Saturday Night released in 1979. They also recorded comeback albums with both Syl Johnson and Al Green. In 2005 Teenie Hodges recorded with Cat Power on her successful album The Greatest. He has also recorded with Alvin "Youngblood" Hart.

In 2012, the filmmaker Susanna Vapnek completed a short documentary on Teenie Hodges, entitled, Mabon "Teenie" Hodges, A Portrait of a Memphis Soul Original. The film premiered at the 2013 SXSW film festival, and went on to receive the audience award at The Indie Memphis Film festival, that same year.

In January 2014, he recorded for the last time together with Charles Hodges, Leroy Hodges, Steve Potts and Mark Plati at the Royal Studios for the last album of Bobbejaan Schoepen.

== Personal life ==
He was married three times, and had eight children: Velencia Anderson, Reginald Hodges, Sheila Hodges, Cherie Hodges, Shonte Stokes, Tabitha Gary, Inga Black, and Mabon L. Hodges II. His nephew is Canadian rapper and singer Drake.

== Death ==
In March 2014, Hodges was taken to Baylor Hospital in Dallas for pneumonia, following an appearance at Austin's South by Southwest music festival. He died there on June 22, 2014, from complications of emphysema. He was 68.
