= Charles Chalmers =

American musician

Charlie Chalmers
- Occupation(s): Producer, songwriter, musician
- Instrument: Saxophone
- Website: charliechalmers.com

Charles Chalmers is an American saxophonist, backup vocalist, songwriter and producer. He has written several hit songs for many recording artists, and has also arranged and performed on many Grammy winning recordings. Seven of those recordings are in the Grammy Hall of Fame: Al Green's "Let's Stay Together"; Aretha Franklin's "Respect," "Chain of Fools" and "Natural Woman"; Dusty Springfield's "Son of a Preacher Man"; and Wilson Pickett's "Mustang Sally" and "Land of a Thousand Dances." He also holds an Album of the Century award for his work on Aretha Franklin's, I Never Loved a Man the Way I Love You.

== Early life and education ==
Chalmers attended South Side High School in Memphis, Tennessee, where he learned to read music. His mother bought him a used tenor saxophone as a graduation gift. He took classes at Memphis State University, but quit after six months so he could start touring with Jerry Lee Lewis.

== Career ==
By age 19, he had toured with Jerry Lee Lewis and worked extensively with Charlie Rich.

Chalmers came to the attention of Bill Black, who called Chalmers for a session. Not long after working with Black, Willie Mitchell asked Chalmers to play on some of his recordings. Chalmers played lead sax on Mitchell's instrumental, "Soul Serenade". Mitchell then called Chalmers to work regularly on his productions, not only as a saxophone player, but also as an arranger and back up singer.

Chalmers helped arrange and sang backup on "Let's Stay Together" by Al Green with Sandy and Donna Rhodes in a group that came to be called Rhodes, Chalmers & Rhodes. They also sang on Green's album, I Can't Stop, produced by Mitchell, for Blue Note Records (2003).

Before recording with Al Green, Chalmers was asked to go to Muscle Shoals, Alabama, to play on a Wilson Pickett recording date for Atlantic Records. "Land of a Thousand Dances" and "Mustang Sally" were two of the songs he recorded with Pickett that week, and it was then that Chalmers met Jerry Wexler and Tom Dowd.

Wexler brought 25-year-old Aretha Franklin to the Fame Studio at Muscle Shoals, introducing her to Chalmers, Chips Moman, and Dewey "Spooner" Oldham, resulting in Chalmers's first track with Franklin, "I Never Loved a Man the Way I Love You". Chalmers wend on to arrange the horns and played sax on many other Aretha Franklin songs, including "I Ain't Never Loved A Man", "Respect", "Do Right Woman", "Chain of Fools", and "Dr. Feel Good".

In 1969, Chalmers announced a partnership with Sandy Rhodes, and a contract with Chess Records. Rick Hall produced Charlie Chalmers' Sax and the Single Girl for Chess Records.

=== Las Vegas and Miami years ===
After Rhodes, Chalmers & Rhodes sang on Paul Anka's hit "(You're) Having My Baby", they performed live dates with Anka in Las Vegas for three years at Caesars Palace. Chalmers located a studio in Las Vegas, where they sang back up on a Frank Sinatra session.

After working for several years in Vegas, Chalmers and his group were called to Miami to do some sessions at Criteria Studios. For the next few years, they recorded with artists including Andy Gibb, The Bee Gees, Fire Fall, Harry Chapin, John Mellencamp and K. C. and the Sunshine Band.

=== Move to Missouri ===
In 1989, Mel Tillis asked Chalmers to work with him at his new theatre in Branson, Missouri. Two years later, Chalmers built his own recording studio in Branson, where he now resides.

== Songs ==
As a songwriter and music publisher, Charlie Chalmers had a #1 hit record by Conway Twitty – "The Clown" – which he co-wrote with Wayne Carson Thompson and Sandy Rhodes. Also among Chalmers' songs are "One Woman", on the Isaac Hayes album Hot Buttered Soul, and "One Big Unhappy Family", on the album The Isaac Hayes Movement. Both albums are double Platinum sellers. "Alice Is In Wonderland" is on The Oak Ridge Boys' Deliver. Al Green also recorded "One Woman" on his Green Is Blues album. The Staple Singers recorded "City In The Sky" for their City In The Sky album, Boz Scaggs recorded "Look What I Got" on his self-titled Atlantic album Boz Scaggs, and Etta James recorded the popular "It Hurts Me So Much" on the album Tell Mama for Chess Records.

Chalmers also wrote "Tell Him Tonight" recorded by Rudolph Taylor, ranked as one of the 60 greatest Memphis soul songs of all time by the Commercial Appeal in 2017.

== Personal life ==
Chalmers was married to Sandy Rhodes. He later married Josie and in 2008 they had a son of the same name.
