= Howard Grimes =

American drummer (1941–2022)

Howard Lee Grimes (August 22, 1941 – February 12, 2022) was an American drummer, best known as a member of the Hi Rhythm Section on records by Al Green, Ann Peebles and others in the 1970s.

== Life and career ==
Born in Memphis, Tennessee on August 22, 1941, Grimes first performed in public at the age of 12, with Rufus Thomas. By his late teens he recorded regularly on sessions for Satellite Records, which later became Stax, where he was tutored by Al Jackson, Jr. He also began working with bandleader and record producer Willie Mitchell at Hi Records, taking over as Mitchell's main drummer after Jackson's death. As a key member of the house band at Mitchell's Royal Studios in Memphis, Grimes was instrumental in creating some of the most memorable songs and soul grooves of the 1970s.

After the demise of Hi Records in the late 1970s, Grimes continued to perform with Teenie Hodges and other members credited as Hi Rhythm or, on the 1994 album Perfect Gentlemen, the Hodges Brothers.

Grimes died from kidney failure on February 12, 2022, at the age of 80.
