= Charles Hodges =

American organist and songwriter (born 1947)

Charles Edward Hodges (born June 29, 1947 in Memphis, Tennessee) is an American organist and songwriter. He is known for his high tone on the Hammond B3 organ, that appeared on records by Al Green, and other musicians signed to Hi Records.

Hodges also played on albums by James Carr, Willie Cobbs, Albert Collins and Boz Scaggs. Hi Records acts Syl Johnson, O.V. Wright, as well as Green and Tom Jones, have all recorded songs written by Hodges. Hodges played keyboards on Vanessa Collier's 2017 album, Meeting My Shadow (Ruf Records) and the Mountain Goats' 2020 album, Getting into Knives (Merge Records).
