= Leroy Hodges =

American musician (born 1943)

Leroy Hodges (born July 13, 1943) is an American electric bass player.

He was born in Germantown, Tennessee, U.S.. Paired with either Booker T. & the MGs's drummer Al Jackson, Jr. or Stax staff drummer Howard Grimes, Leroy and The Hodges Brothers were the backing musicians for Al Green, Ann Peebles and several other soul, gospel and blues artists, primarily on the Hi Records label in Memphis, Tennessee.

Remaining active, Hodges appeared on albums by American R&B musicians Rufus Thomas and Bobby Rush. He also appeared on Cat Power's 2006 album The Greatest, and Frazey Ford's 2014 album, Indian Ocean.

== Other sources ==
- Richard Johnston (November 11, 2023). "Leroy Hodges: Hi & Mighty". Bass Player (January 2006): 28.
