= Martha Wash discography =

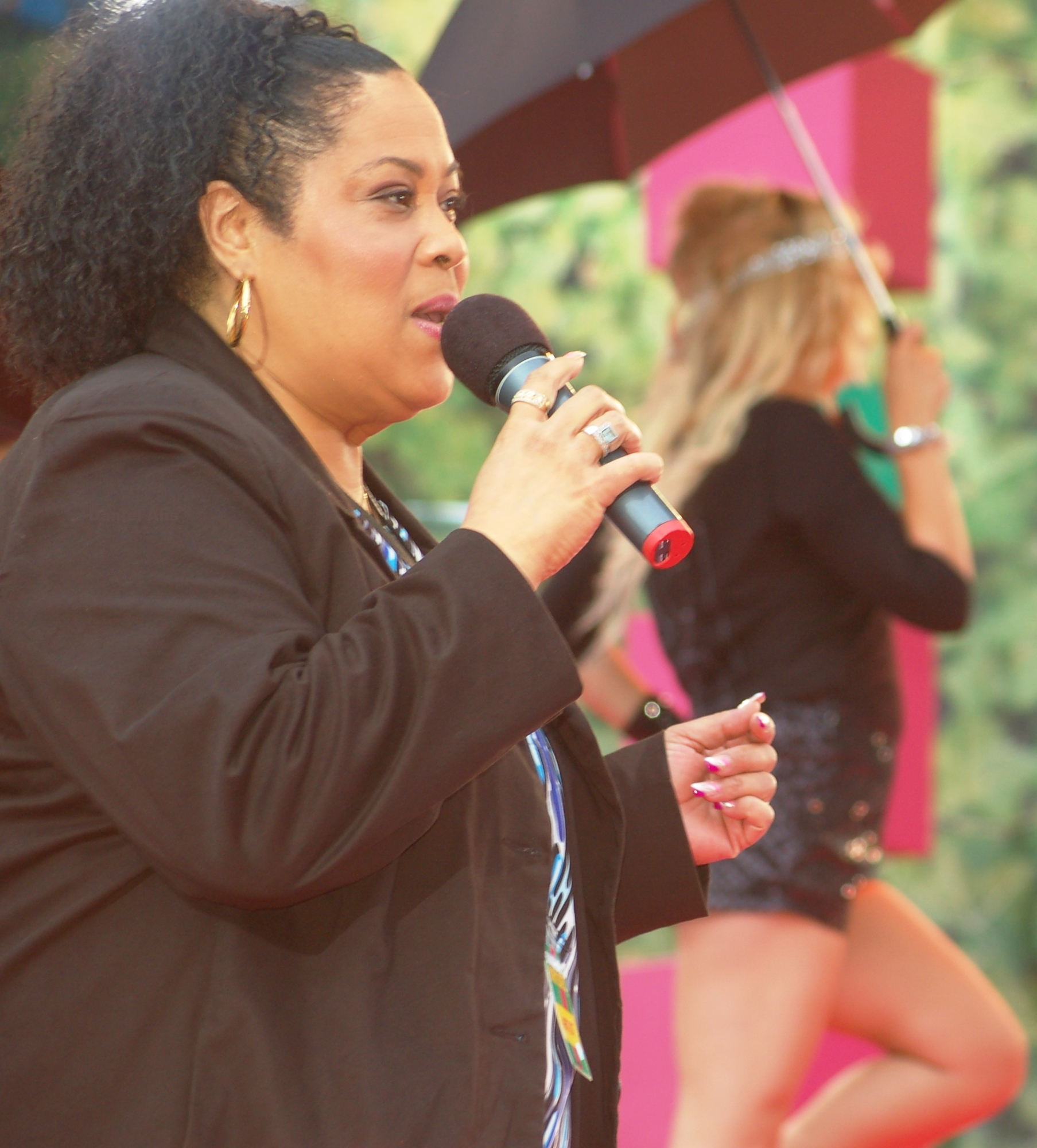
- Studio albums: 3
- Compilation albums: 1
- Singles: 34

American singer and songwriter Martha Wash has released three studio albums, one compilation album, and 34 singles. She has a total of 12 number-one hits on Billboard's Dance chart to date. Her success has earned her the honorific title The Queen of Clubland.

In 1989, Wash recorded several songs for Italian house music group Black Box. They released a single called "I Don't Know Anybody Else", which featured Wash's recorded vocals. The song became Wash's first number-one hit on Dance chart as a featured artist. Their success was followed by the release of their next single "Everybody Everybody" (1990), and later "Strike It Up" (1991). Wash, who was not a core member of the group, did not receive proper sleeve credits on the songs until she won a lawsuit against the distributing record label for royalties and directly contributed to legislation ensuring proper credit for vocalists on both songs and music videos. In the same year, she featured on another single called "Gonna Make You Sweat (Everybody Dance Now)" by C+C Music Factory. The song achieved success peaking at number-one on many international charts and became certified platinum.

In January 1993, Wash released her debut self-titled album. The album spawned the number one Dance hits "Carry On" and "Give It to You". In 1997, American DJ and producer Todd Terry released an album, Ready for a New Day. The album featured the number-one Dance singles "Keep on Jumpin'" and "Something Goin' On", which also featured Wash and Jocelyn Brown. In 1998, Wash released her greatest hits album The Collection. The lead single "It's Raining Men...The Sequel", which featured RuPaul, peaked at number twenty-two on the Club Play chart. She released "Catch the Light", which became her tenth number-one song on Billboard's Dance Chart. The final single "Come" was also release which chart in the top-five.

In January 2013, Wash release her second album Something Good. The album spawn the singles: "I've Got You", "It's My Time", and the top-charted single "I'm Not Coming Down". In January 2020, Wash released her third album Love & Conflict.

== Albums ==
=== Studio albums ===
Title	Album details	Peak chart positions		
Title	Album details	US	US R&B	US Heat
Martha Wash	Released: February 23, 1993; Label: RCA; Formats: CD, cassette	169	42	8
Something Good	Released: January 10, 2013; Label: Purple Rose; Formats: CD, digital download	—	—	—
Love & Conflict	Released: January 6, 2020; Label: Purple Rose; Format: Digital download, streaming	—	—	—

=== Compilation albums ===
Title	Album details
The Collection	Released: January 27, 1998; Label: Logic Records; Formats: CD

== Singles ==
=== As main performer ===
Title	Year	Peak chart positions										Certifications	Album
Title	Year	US	US R&B	US Dance	BEL	FRA	GER	IRE	NLD	NZ	UK	Certifications	Album
"You're My One and Only (True Love)" (Note: Wash did not receive credits as a featured vocalist until winning a lawsuit later.) (with Seduction)	1989	23	56	3	—	—	—	—	—	—	92		Nothing Matters Without Love
"I Don't Know Anybody Else" (with Black Box)	1989	23	10	1	21	9	12	2	25	9	4		Dreamland
"Everybody Everybody" (with Black Box)	1990	8	2	1	29	11	41	6	29	11	16		Dreamland
"Fantasy" (with Black Box)	1990	—	—	—	20	21	16	3	18	28	5	ARIA: Gold; BPI: Silver	Dreamland
"Gonna Make You Sweat (Everybody Dance Now)" (with C+C Music Factory)	1990	1	1	1	5	43	1	13	1	2	3	RIAA: 2× Platinum; BPI: Silver	Gonna Make You Sweat
"Strike It Up" (with Black Box)	1991	8	16	1	13	26	26	8	4	29	16		Dreamland
"Open Your Eyes" (with Black Box)	1991	—	—	—	—	45	44	—	—	—	48		Dreamland
"Hold On" (with Black Box)	1992	—	—	—	—	—	—	—	—	—	—		Dreamland
"Carry On"	1992	—	97	1	—	—	—	—	38	—	49		Martha Wash
"Give It to You"	1993	90	48	1	—	—	—	—	—	—	37		Martha Wash
"Runaround"	1993	—	—	10	—	—	—	—	—	—	49		Martha Wash
"So Whatcha Gonna Do"	1993	—	—	—	—	—	—	—	—	—	—		Martha Wash
"It's Raining Men...The Sequel" (featuring RuPaul)	1998	—	—	22	—	—	—	—	—	—	21		The Collection
"Catch the Light"	1998	—	—	1	—	—	—	—	—	—	45		The Collection
"Come"	1998	—	—	4	—	—	—	—	—	—	64		The Collection
"It's Raining Men"	2000	—	—	—	—	—	—	—	—	—	56		Non-album single
"Listen to the People"	2000	—	—	14	—	—	—	—	—	—	—		Non-album single
"You Lift Me Up"	2005	—	—	5	—	—	—	—	—	—	—		Non-album single
"I've Got You"	2011	—	—	—	—	—	—	—	—	—	—		Something Good
"It's My Time"	2013	—	—	—	—	—	—	—	—	—	—		Something Good
"I'm Not Coming Down"	2014	—	—	2	—	—	—	—	—	—	—		Something Good
"Come into the Light"	2018	—	—	—	—	—	—	—	—	—	—		Non-album single
"Like Fire"	2019	—	—	—	—	—	—	—	—	—	—		Love & Conflict
"It All Gets Back"	2020	—	—	—	—	—	—	—	—	—	—		Non-album single

=== As featured performer ===
Title	Year	Peak chart positions										Certifications	Album
Title	Year	US	US R&B	US Dance	BEL	CAN	GER	IRE	NLD	NZ	UK	Certifications	Album
"Do You Wanna Get Funky" (C+C Music Factory featuring Martha Wash, Zelma Davis, and Trilogy)	1994	40	11	1	38	1	41	—	18	2	27		Anything Goes!
"Keep on Jumpin'" (Todd Terry featuring Martha Wash and Jocelyn Brown)	1996	—	—	1	—	2	—	24	47	—	8		Ready for a New Day
"Something Goin' On" (Todd Terry featuring Martha Wash and Jocelyn Brown)	1997	—	—	1	7	11	93	—	64	—	5	BPI: Silver	Ready for a New Day
"Ready for a New Day" (Todd Terry featuring Martha Wash)	1998	—	—	—	—	—	—	—	—	—	20		Ready for a New Day
"Keep Your Body Working" (Tony Moran featuring Martha Wash)	2007	—	—	1	—	—	—	—	—	—	—		The Event
"Free People" (Tony Moran featuring Martha Wash)	2015	—	—	1	—	—	—	—	—	—	—		Non-album single
"Show Some Love" (First Ladies of Disco)	2015	—	—	6	—	—	—	—	—	—	—		Non-album single
"N2U" (Showtek featuring Martha Wash and Eva Shaw)	2016	—	—	—	—	—	—	—	—	—	—		Non-album single
"I Didn't Know" (Serhat featuring Martha Wash)	2017	—	—	25	—	—	—	—	—	—	—		Non-album single
"Don't Stop Me Now" (First Ladies of Disco)	2019	—	—	9	—	—	—	—	—	—	—		Non-album single

== Soundtrack appearances ==
Song	Year	Movie
"Breakin' The Ice"	1986	Gung Ho
"Mr. Big Stuff"	1994	D2: The Mighty Ducks
"I'm Still Standing"	1996	The First Wives Club
"Magic Charms"	1997	Kiss Me, Guido
"Come into the Light"	2019	Wholly Broken
"What a Day" (featuring Jenifer Kocher Demeo and Ryan Hilliard)	2019	Wholly Broken

== See also ==
- The Weather Girls discography
