= Loleatta (1977 album) =

Studio album by Loleatta Holloway
- Released: 1977
- Recorded: Sigma Sound, Philadelphia, Pennsylvania; Paragon, Chicago, Illinois
- Genres: R&B, disco
- Label: Gold Mind
- Producers: Norman Harris, Ron Kersey, Floyd Smith

Loleatta Holloway chronology
Cry to Me (1975)	Loleatta (1977)	Queen of the Night (1978)

Professional ratings
Review scores
Source	Rating
AllMusic	4/5 stars
Christgau's Record Guide	B−

Loleatta is the third studio album recorded by American singer Loleatta Holloway, released in 1977 on the Gold Mind label. Another Holloway album titled Loleatta was released in 1973.

== History ==
The album features the singles "Worn Out Broken Heart", which peaked at #25 on the Hot Soul Singles chart, and "Dreamin'", which peaked at #72 on the Billboard Hot 100. "Hit and Run" also charted at #56 on the Hot Soul Singles chart. The album was remastered and reissued with bonus tracks in 2013 by Big Break Records.

== Track listing ==
Side one
No.	Title	Writer(s)	Length
1.	"Hit and Run"	Allan Felder, Norman Harris, Ron Tyson	5:52
2.	"Is It Just a Man's Way?"	Floyd Smith	3:38
3.	"We're Getting Stronger (The Longer We Stay Together)"	Allan Felder, Norman Harris, Ron Tyson	4:34
4.	"Dreamin'"	Allan Felder, Norman Harris, Ron Tyson	6:17

Side two
No.	Title	Writer(s)	Length
5.	"Ripped Off"	Allan Felder, Norman Harris, Ron Tyson	4:49
6.	"Worn Out Broken Heart"	Sam Dees, Sandra Drayton	5:23
7.	"That's How Heartaches Are Made"	Ben Raleigh, Bob Halley	3:00
8.	"What Now"	Curtis Mayfield	6:11

2013 remastered reissue bonus tracks
No.	Title	Length
9.	"Run Away" (with the Salsoul Orchestra)	4:45
10.	"Dreamin'" (12" Disco Version)	8:54
11.	"Hit and Run" (12" Disco Version)	11:05
12.	"We're Getting Stronger (The Longer We Stay Together)" (12" Disco Version)	7:20
13.	"Worn Out Broken Heart" (Single Version)	3:49
14.	"Dreamin'" (Single Version)	3:09

== Personnel ==
Sigma Sound Studios

- Earl Young – drums
- Ron Baker – bass guitar
- Roland Chambers, Bobby Eli, Norman Harris, T.J. Tindall – guitars
- T.G. Conway, Cotton Kent, Ron Kersey – keyboards
- Larry Washington – congas
- Vincent Montana Jr. – vibes
- Barbara Ingram, Evette Benton, Carla Benson – background vocals
- Jack Faith – flute
- Robert Hartzell, Rocco Bene – trumpets
- Roger De Lillo, Fred Joiner, Richard Genovese, Robert Moore – trombones
- Joe De Angelis, Milton Phibbs, Jeffery Kirschen – French horns
- Don Renaldo, Rudolph Malizia, Richard Jones, Gov Hutchinson, Charles Apollonia, Americus Mungiole, Diane Barnett, Christine Reeves – violins
- Davis Barnett, Anthony Sinagoga – violas
- Romeo Di Stefano – cello

Paragon Studios

- Quentin Joseph – drums
- Bernard Reed – bass
- Bobby Eli, John Bishop – guitars
- Tennyson Stephens – keyboards
- Emanuel Willis, Henry Gibson – congas
- Lionel Bordelon, Eddie Shedosky – trumpets
- Gene Chausow, Bill Klinghoffer – French horns
- Morris Ellis, Tillman Buggs – trombones
- James Mack – flute
- Ruth Goodman, Jerry Sabrensky, Joe Golan, Everett Mirsky, Sol Bobrov, Elliott Golub, Fred Spector – violins
- Lee R. Lane, Roger Moulton, Harold Kupper – violas

== Charts ==
Singles

Year	Single	Peak chart positions		
Year	Single	US	US R&B	US Dan
1976	"Worn Out Broken Heart"	—	25	—
1977	"Dreamin'"	72	—	3
1977	"Hit and Run"	—	56	3
1977	"Ripped Off"	—	—	3
