= Give It to You =

Give It to You may refer to:

- "Give It to You" (Eve song), 2007
- "Give It to You" (Jordan Knight song), 1999
- "Give It to You" (Martha Wash song), 1993
- "Give It 2 You", a 1994 song by Da Brat
- "Give It 2 U", a 2013 song by Robin Thicke
