= Queen of the Night (Loleatta Holloway album) =

Studio album by Loleatta Holloway
- Released: 1978
- Studios: Sigma Sound, Philadelphia and New York City
- Genres: R&B, disco
- Label: Gold Mind
- Producers: Norman Harris, Bunny Sigler, Tom Moulton, Ron Tyson, Floyd Smith, Gordon Edwards

Loleatta Holloway chronology
Loleatta (1977)	Queen of the Night (1978)	Loleatta Holloway (1979)

Queen of the Night is the fourth studio album recorded by American singer Loleatta Holloway, released in 1978 on the Gold Mind label.

== History ==
The album peaked at No. 47 on the R&B albums chart. It also reached No. 187 on the Billboard 200. The album features the single "Only You", a duet with Bunny Sigler, which peaked at No. 11 on the Hot Soul Singles chart and No. 87 on the Billboard Hot 100. "Catch Me on the Rebound" also charted at No. 92 on the Hot Soul Singles chart. The album was remastered and reissued with bonus tracks in 2014 by Big Break Records.

== Critical reception ==
Professional ratings
Review scores
Source	Rating
AllMusic	4/5 stars
Christgau's Record Guide	A−
The Virgin Encyclopedia of R&B and Soul	3/5 stars

The Bay State Banner wrote that the album "combines the sound of Europe a la Thor Baldursson with the horns and voices of Philly."

== Track listing ==
Side one
No.	Title	Writer(s)	Length
1.	"Catch Me on the Rebound"	Norman Harris, Ron Tyson	6:10
2.	"Only You" (guest vocals by Bunny Sigler)	Bunny Sigler	6:14
3.	"Good Good Feeling"	Norman Harris, Ron Tyson	4:15
4.	"Mama Don't, Papa Won't"	Mikki Farrow, Robert Strother, Frank Alstin, Jr.	5:00

Side two
No.	Title	Writer(s)	Length
1.	"I May Not Be There When You Want Me (But I'm Right on Time)"	Bunny Sigler	7:35
2.	"You Light Up My Life"	Joseph Brooks	4:05
3.	"Two Sides to Every Story"	Ron Tyson, Edward Moore	4:30
4.	"I'm in Love"	Bobby Womack	4:15

2014 remastered reissue bonus tracks
No.	Title	Length
9.	"Catch Me on the Rebound" (12" Disco Mix)	10:53
10.	"I May Not Be There When You Want Me (But I'm Right on Time)" (12" Disco Mix)	10:22
11.	"Catch Me on the Rebound" (Disco Madness Mix)	7:34

== Personnel ==
- Scotty Miller, Steve Gadd, Earl Young – drums
- Raymond Earl, Gordon Edwards, Jimmy Williams – bass guitar
- Cornell Dupree, Eric Gale, Norman Harris, Kim Miller, Edward Moore, T.J. Tindall – guitars
- George Bussey, Bruce Gray, Ron Kersey, Dennis Richardson, Bunny Sigler, Jimmy Sigler, Richard Tee – keyboards
- James Walker, Larry Washington, Emanuel Williams – congas
- Bunny Harris, Moto – percussion
- Carla Benson, Evette Benton, Barbara Ingram, Madeline Strickland, Mikki Farrow, Ron Tyson – background vocals

== Charts ==
Chart (1978)	Peak
U.S. Billboard Top LPs	187
U.S. Billboard Top Soul LPs	47

Singles

Year	Single	Peak chart positions		
Year	Single	US	US R&B	US Dan
1978	"Only You" (with Bunny Sigler)	87	11	9
1978	"Catch Me on the Rebound"	—	92	9
