= Love Sensation (album) =

Studio album by Loleatta Holloway
- Released: 1980
- Recorded: Sigma Sound Studios (Philadelphia, Pennsylvania); The Schoolhouse (New York City, New York); Blank Tape Studios (New York City, New York); Muscle Shoals Sound Studios (Sheffield, Alabama); Universal Recording Studio (Chicago, Illinois)
- Genres: R&B, disco
- Label: Gold Mind
- Producers: Dan Hartman, Norman Harris, Bobby Womack, Patrick Moten, Floyd Smith, Ron Tyson

Loleatta Holloway chronology
Loleatta Holloway (1979)	Love Sensation (1980)	Greatest Hits (1996)

Professional ratings
Review scores
Source	Rating
Allmusic	3/5 stars

Love Sensation is the sixth and final studio album recorded by American singer Loleatta Holloway, released in 1980 on the Gold Mind label.

== History ==
The album features the title track, which peaked at #1 on the Hot Dance Club Play chart. The second single release, a cover of Otis Redding's "I've Been Loving You Too Long", failed to chart. The album was remastered and reissued with bonus tracks in 2013 by Big Break Records.

== Track listing ==
Side one
No.	Title	Writer(s)	Length
1.	"Love Sensation"	Dan Hartman	6:15
2.	"Long Hard Climb to Love"	Michael Berardi, Richard Berardi	4:37
3.	"Short End of the Stick"	Bobby Womack, Cecil Womack	3:12
4.	"I've Been Loving You Too Long"	Otis Redding, Jerry Butler	4:35

Side two
No.	Title	Writer(s)	Length
5.	"Two Became a Crowd"	Gene Allan, Gary Knight	5:23
6.	"Dance What 'Cha Wanna"	Bobby Womack, Cecil Womack	5:10
7.	"My Way"	Bobby Womack, Noel Resnick	5:30
8.	"I'll Be Standing There"	Norman Harris, Ron Tyson	4:50

2013 remastered reissue bonus tracks
No.	Title	Length
9.	"Love Sensation" (Tom Moulton 12" Mix)	6:31
10.	"Love Sensation" (Shep Pettibone 12" Mix)	7:43
11.	"Love Sensation" (Tom Moulton Long Remix)	8:35
12.	"Love Sensation" (Short Version)	3:52

== Personnel ==
- Dan Hartman – keyboards, bass guitar, percussion, backing vocals
- Keith Benson, Brian Brake, Steve Gadd, Roger Hawkins – drums
- Gordon Edwards, Jimmy Williams, Anthony Willis – bass guitar
- Eric Gale, Norman Harris, Phil Houghton, T.J. Tindall, Bobby Womack – guitars
- Eugene Curry, Cotton Kent, Patrick Moten, Richard Tee – keyboards
- David Cruse, Ron Tyson, Larry Washington – congas
- Jimmy Maelen – timbales
- Barbara Ingram, Evette Benton, Carla Benson, Blanche Napoleon, Bobby Womack, The Waters, Patrick Moten, Madeline Strickland – background vocals
- Don Renaldo and His Strings and Horns, Patrick Moten and His Strings and Horns – strings
- Muscle Shoals Horns – horns

== Charts ==
Singles

Year	Single	Peak
Year	Single	US Dan
1980	"Love Sensation"	1
