= Cry to Me (album) =

Studio album by Loleatta Holloway
- Released: 1975
- Recorded: The Sound Pit (Atlanta, Georgia)
- Genre: R&B
- Label: Aware
- Producer: Floyd Smith

Loleatta Holloway chronology
Loleatta (1973)	Cry to Me (1975)	Loleatta (1977)

Professional ratings
Review scores
Source	Rating
Allmusic	3/5 stars

Cry to Me is the second studio album recorded by American singer Loleatta Holloway, released in 1975 on the Aware label.

== Chart performance ==
The album peaked at No. 47 on the US R&B albums chart. The title track peaked at No. 10 on the Billboard Hot Soul Singles chart and No. 68 on the Hot 100. Another single, "I Know Where You're Coming From", peaked at No. 69 on the Hot Soul Singles chart. Two other singles, "H•e•l•p M•e M•y L•o•r•d" and "Casanova", were released and failed to chart.

== Track listing ==
Side one
No.	Title	Writer(s)	Length
1.	"Cry to Me"	Sam Dees, David Camon	5:45
2.	"I Know Where You're Coming From"	Sam Dees	3:19
3.	"The Show Must Go On"	Sam Dees	3:50
4.	"The World Don't Owe You Nothing"	Sam Dees, Frederick Knight	3:10
5.	"Just Be True to Me"	Curtis Mayfield	3:16

Side two
No.	Title	Writer(s)	Length
6.	"Something About the Way I Feel"	Ronnie Walker, Johnny Jacobs	3:23
7.	"I'll Be Gone"	Loleatta Holloway	4:08
8.	"I Can't Help Myself"	Jerline Williams, William Johnson	3:48
9.	"Casanova"	Jo Armstead	3:42
10.	"H•e•l•p• M•e• M•y• L•o•r•d•"	Sam Dees	2:48

== Production ==
- Floyd Smith – producer
- Milan Bogdan – engineer & mastering
- Ruby Mazur – album design
- Nick Rietz – photography

== Charts ==
Chart (1975)	Peak
U.S. Billboard Top Soul LPs	47

Singles

Year	Single	Peaks	
Year	Single	US	US R&B
1975	"Cry to Me"	68	10
1975	"I Know Where You're Coming From"	—	69
