= Dreamland (Black Box album) =

Studio album by Black Box
- Released: May 8, 1990
- Recorded: November 1988–September 1989
- Genres: Italo house; Eurodance; disco
- Length: 40:41
- Label: RCA
- Producer: Groove Groove Melody

Black Box chronology
| Dreamland (1990) | Mixed Up (1991) |

Singles from Dreamland
- 1. "Ride on Time" Released: July 19, 1989; 2. "I Don't Know Anybody Else" Released: December 18, 1989; 3. "Everybody Everybody" Released: March 15, 1990; 4. "Fantasy" Released: 1990; 5. "Strike It Up" Released: February 6, 1991; 6. "Open Your Eyes" Released: 1991; 7. "Hold On" Released: 1992

Dreamland is the debut studio album by the Italian music group Black Box. It was released on May 8, 1990 through RCA Records, and was preceded in 1989 by the international hit single "Ride on Time". The album was certified Gold in both the United States and the United Kingdom. It is noted for "Ride on Time" and the ensuing lawsuits by Loleatta Holloway and Martha Wash over their lack of proper credit and payment for their vocal contributions to the album.

== Background and artwork ==
When the album was originally released, the credits listed the band members as Daniele Davoli, Mirko Limoni and Valerio Semplici (as the producers, songwriters and musicians), as well as Katrin Quinol on vocals. Quinol did not contribute musically to the album. "Ride on Time" had been released as a single prior to the album's release, and singer-songwriter Dan Hartman and singer Loleatta Holloway had threatened to sue Black Box, as well as label RCA Records, claiming that the song contained heavy sampling of an earlier recording by the two (the 1980 number-one dance club hit "Love Sensation"), although no credit had been given to them upon the release of the single. Subsequently, Hartman was given songwriting credit for this track, and Holloway was listed as the featured vocalist prior to the release of the album. However, American singer Martha Wash actually sang the lead vocals on six of the other eight tracks on the album, although she was not credited in any way. The songs sung by Wash are: "Everybody Everybody"; "I Don't Know Anybody Else"; "Open Your Eyes"; "Fantasy"; "Hold On"; and "Strike It Up". Many of these songs were released as singles and achieved significant success on radio airplay and dance charts across the world. Wash claimed in a lawsuit filed soon after the success of the album's release that she was paid a flat fee as a "session singer" to record demos of the tracks that would eventually appear on the album, but that those songs would be re-recorded with a different vocalist. She reached a settlement with RCA Records that led to her recording contract with the label, as well as an undisclosed monetary compensation. The legal action by Wash and Holloway spurred legislation in the United States making vocal credits mandatory on albums and music videos.

The artwork of Dreamland depicts Katrin Quinol sporting a cropped jacket and mini skirt.

== Critical reception ==
Professional ratings
Review scores
| Source | Rating |
|---|---|
| AllMusic | 4.5/5 stars |
| Robert Christgau | 2/3 stars |
| The Encyclopedia of Popular Music | 1/5 stars |
| Melody Maker | (mixed) |
| New Musical Express | 8/10 |
| Record Mirror | 3.5/5 stars |
| The Rolling Stone Album Guide | 3/5 stars |

A review published in Music Week magazine elected Dreamland "Album of the week", adding that there are "some interesting instrumentals and a cover of Earth, Wind & Fire's "Fantasy" [that] break the mould that seem to set in at the start of the LP with every song sounding like "Ride on Time"". In his book In Pista!, Italian writer Rocco Bargioni gives a positive review, saying that “in the U.S., house music had already been all the rage for a few years when a DJ, a keyboardist, and a clarinetist locked themselves in a studio and created this mega-project featuring lip-syncing, samples (sometimes even officially licensed), and some of the most refined sounds a DJ could offer in a nightclub—except during the early part of the night. And for a while, Americans feared that Europeans were doing house music better". He added that "Black Box’s Italo house, with its soul and jazz influences, took off everywhere".

== Promotional videos ==
Various music videos were produced for Dreamland:

- "Ride On Time (Remix)" (original version)
- "Ride On Time (Remix)" (Videodreams version)
- "I Don't Know Anybody Else" (original version)
- "I Don't Know Anybody Else" (US re-edit)
- "Everybody Everybody" (original version)
- "Everybody Everybody" (US version)
- "Fantasy"
- "Strike It Up" (DJ Lelewel Remix)

Montage videos were also made for "The Total Mix" and "Open Your Eyes".

== Track listing ==
All tracks are written by Daniele Davoli, Mirko Limoni, and Valerio Semplici, except where noted.

Side A
| No. | Title | Writer(s) | Vocals | Length |
|---|---|---|---|---|
| 1. | "Everybody Everybody" | | Martha Wash | 5:24 (Note: North American editions of the album have the Le Freak Mix 7" Edit of this song, which is 4:09 in length.) |
| 2. | "I Don't Know Anybody Else" | | Wash | 4:36 |
| 3. | "Open Your Eyes" | | Wash | 5:21 |
| 4. | "Fantasy" | Eduardo del Barrio; Maurice White; Verdine White | Wash | 5:14 |

Side B
| No. | Title | Writer(s) | Vocals | Length |
|---|---|---|---|---|
| 1. | "Dreamland" | | | 2:03 |
| 2. | "Ride on Time" | Davoli; Limoni; Semplici; Dan Hartman | Loleatta Holloway (Note: Digital streaming vocals replaced by Celestine Walcott-Gordon (current Black Box stage vocalist).) | 4:37 |
| 3. | "Hold On" | | Wash | 5:38 |
| 4. | "Ghost Box" | | | 3:57 |
| 5. | "Strike It Up" | | Wash (vocals); Oscar Pabon (rap); (Note: Digital streaming rap by Stepz.) | 5:15 |

== Personnel ==
- Daniele Davoli – arrangement, recording, engineering, mixing, DJ, scratching, keyboards, backing vocals
- Mirko Limoni – arrangement, recording, engineering, mixing, keyboards
- Valerio Semplici – arrangement, recording, engineering, mixing, guitar, drum programming
- Black Box – production (credited as Groove Groove Melody)
- Martha Wash – vocals
- Heather Small – vocals
- Loleatta Holloway – vocals (on some editions)
- Stepz – vocals
- Roberto Fontalan – guitar
- Sauro Malavasi – guitar
- Rudy Trevisi – saxophone
- Raimondo Violi – bass, guitar
- Kate Garner – photography

== Charts ==
Weekly chart performance for Dreamland by Black Box
| Chart (1990–1991) | Peak position |
|---|---|
| Australian Albums (ARIA) | 1 |
| Austrian Albums (Ö3 Austria) | 14 |
| Canada Top Albums/CDs (RPM) | 18 |
| Dutch Albums (Album Top 100) | 63 |
| French Albums (SNEP) | 35 |
| German Albums (Offizielle Top 100) | 36 |
| New Zealand Albums (RMNZ) | 4 |
| Norwegian Albums (VG-lista) | 8 |
| Swedish Albums (Sverigetopplistan) | 15 |
| Swiss Albums (Schweizer Hitparade) | 9 |
| UK Albums (Official Charts) | 14 |
| US Billboard 200 | 56 |
| US Top R&B/Hip-Hop Albums (Billboard) | 16 |

Year-end chart performance for Dreamland by Black Box
| Chart (1990) | Position |
|---|---|
| Canadian Albums (RPM) | 88 |
| New Zealand Albums (RMNZ) | 46 |
| US Top R&B/Hip-Hop Albums (Billboard) | 80 |
| Chart (1991) | Position |
| Australian Albums (ARIA) | 16 |
| US Top R&B/Hip-Hop Albums (Billboard) | 52 |

== Certifications ==
| Region | Certification | Certified units/sales |
|---|---|---|
| Australia (ARIA) | Platinum | 70,000^{^} |
| Canada (Music Canada) | 2× Platinum | 200,000^{^} |
| Spain (Promusicae) | Gold | 50,000^{^} |
| Switzerland (IFPI Switzerland) | Gold | 25,000^{^} |
| United Kingdom (BPI) | Gold | 400,000^{^} |
| United States (RIAA) | Gold | 500,000^{^} |
^{^} Shipments figures based on certification alone.
