= Loleatta Holloway (album) =

Studio album by Loleatta Holloway
- Released: 1979
- Recorded: Sigma (Philadelphia, Pennsylvania); Muscle Shoals (Sheffield, Alabama); Universal (Chicago, Illinois); PS (Chicago, Illinois)
- Genres: R&B, disco
- Label: Gold Mind
- Producers: Floyd Smith, Bobby Womack, Patrick Moten, Bunny Sigler

Loleatta Holloway chronology
Queen of the Night (1978)	Loleatta Holloway (1979)	Love Sensation (1980)

Loleatta Holloway is the fifth studio album by American singer Loleatta Holloway, released in 1979 on the Gold Mind label.

== History ==
The album features the single "That's What You Said", which peaked at No. 30 on the Hot Dance Club Play chart. The album was remastered and reissued with bonus tracks in 2014 by Big Break Records.

== Critical reception ==
Professional ratings
Review scores
Source	Rating
The Virgin Encyclopedia of R&B and Soul	3/5 stars

The Boston Globe wrote that "boisterous, unusual disco riffs interfere with her vocals, which are wrongfully slick, the opposite of her jubilant best."

== Track listing ==
Side one
No.	Title	Writer(s)	Length
1.	"The Greatest Performance of My Life"	Sandro, Óscar Anderle, Robert Allen	7:00
2.	"All About the Paper"	Lowrell Simon, Clarence McDonald	6:10
3.	"There Must Be a Reason"	Bobby Womack, Bobby Incorvia	6:20

Side two
No.	Title	Writer(s)	Length
1.	"That's What You Said"	Bunny Sigler, Rick Wigginton	6:55
2.	"Baby It's You"	Burt Bacharach, Barney Williams, Mack David	3:59
3.	"There'll Come a Time"	Floyd Smith, Eugene Record	4:45
4.	"Sweet Mother of Mine"	Helen Robinson	4:45

2014 remastered reissue bonus tracks
No.	Title	Length
8.	"The Greatest Performance of My Life" (12" Disco Mix)	9:29
9.	"That's What You Said" (12" Disco Mix)	10:10
10.	"All About the Paper" (Extended Version)	7:11
11.	"The Greatest Performance of My Life" (Larry Levan Mix)	6:48

== Personnel ==
- Roger Hawkins, Maurice Jennings, Scotty Miller – drums
- Raymond Earl, Bernard Reed, Anthony Willis – bass guitar
- John Bishop, Kim Miller, T.J. Tindall, Bobby Womack – guitars
- Patrick Moten, Dennis Richardson, Bunny Sigler, Jimmy Sigler – keyboards
- Larry Washington, Emanuel Williams – congas
- Bobby Womack, Barbara Ingram, Evette Benton, Carla Benson, The Waters, Patrick Moten – background vocals
- The James Mack String Section, Don Renaldo and His Strings and Horns, Patrick Moten and His Strings and Horns – strings
- Muscle Shoals Horns – horns

== Charts ==
Singles

Year	Single	Peak
Year	Single	US Dan
1979	"That's What You Said"	30
