= List of RPM number-one dance singles of 1991 =

These are the RPM magazine Dance number one hits of 1991.

== Chart history ==
Issue date	Song	Artist	Reference(s)
January 19	"Wiggle It"	2 in a Room	
January 26	"Wiggle It"	2 in a Room	
February 2	"Gonna Make You Sweat (Everybody Dance Now)"	C+C Music Factory	
February 9	"Gonna Make You Sweat (Everybody Dance Now)"	C+C Music Factory	
February 16	"Gonna Make You Sweat (Everybody Dance Now)"	C+C Music Factory	
February 23	"Gonna Make You Sweat (Everybody Dance Now)"	C+C Music Factory	
March 3	"Gonna Make You Sweat (Everybody Dance Now)"	C+C Music Factory	
March 9	"Gonna Make You Sweat (Everybody Dance Now)"	C+C Music Factory	
March 16	"Sadeness (Part I)	Enigma	
March 23	"Sadeness (Part I)	Enigma	
March 30	"Mary Had a Little Boy"	Snap!	
April 6	"Mary Had a Little Boy"	Snap!	
April 13	"Here We Go (Let's Rock & Roll)"	C+C Music Factory	
April 20	"Here We Go (Let's Rock & Roll)"	C+C Music Factory	
April 27	"Here We Go (Let's Rock & Roll)"	C+C Music Factory	
May 4	"Here We Go (Let's Rock & Roll)"	C+C Music Factory	
May 11	"Here We Go (Let's Rock & Roll)"	C+C Music Factory	
May 18	"Here We Go (Let's Rock & Roll)"	C+C Music Factory	
May 25	"Strike It Up"	Black Box	
June 1	"Strike It Up"	Black Box	
June 8	"Mea Culpa (Part II)"	Enigma	
June 15	"Mea Culpa (Part II)"	Enigma	
June 22	"Strike It Up"	Black Box	
June 29	"People Are Still Having Sex"	LaTour	
July 6	"People Are Still Having Sex"	LaTour	
July 13	"Gypsy Woman (She's Homeless)"	Crystal Waters	
July 20	"Gypsy Woman (She's Homeless)"	Crystal Waters	
July 27	"Gypsy Woman (She's Homeless)"	Crystal Waters	
August 3	"This Beat is Hot"	B.G., the Prince of Rap	
August 10	"This Beat is Hot"	B.G., the Prince of Rap	
August 17	"This Beat is Hot"	B.G., the Prince of Rap	
August 24	"Let the Beat Hit 'Em"	Lisa Lisa and Cult Jam	
August 31	"Things That Make You Go Hmmm..."	C+C Music Factory	
September 7	"Things That Make You Go Hmmm..."	C+C Music Factory	
September 14	"Now That We Found Love"	Heavy D & the Boyz	
September 21	"Now That We Found Love"	Heavy D & the Boyz	
September 28	"Now That We Found Love"	Heavy D & the Boyz	
October 5	"3 a.m. Eternal"	The KLF	
October 12	"Now That We Found Love"	Heavy D & the Boyz	
October 19	"Things That Make You Go Hmmm..."	C+C Music Factory	
October 26	"Things That Make You Go Hmmm..."	C+C Music Factory	
November 2	"Makin' Happy"	Crystal Waters	
November 9	"Running Back to You"	Vanessa Williams	
November 16	"Finally"	CeCe Peniston	
November 23	"Finally"	CeCe Peniston	
November 30	"Set Adrift on Memory Bliss"	P.M. Dawn	
December 7	"Set Adrift on Memory Bliss"	P.M. Dawn	
December 14	"Set Adrift on Memory Bliss"	P.M. Dawn	
December 21	"Set Adrift on Memory Bliss"	P.M. Dawn	
December 28	"Black or White"	Michael Jackson	

== See also ==
- 1991 in Canadian music
- List of RPM number-one dance singles chart (Canada)
