= Loleatta (1973 album) =

Studio album by Loleatta Holloway
- Released: 1973
- Recorded: The Sound Pit (Atlanta, Georgia)
- Genre: R&B
- Label: Aware
- Producer: Floyd Smith

Loleatta Holloway chronology
Loleatta (1973)	Cry to Me (1975)

Professional ratings
Review scores
Source	Rating
Allmusic	3/5 stars

Loleatta is the debut studio album recorded by American singer Loleatta Holloway, released in 1973 on the Aware label.

== History ==
The album features the singles "Mother of Shame", which peaked at #63 on the Hot Soul Singles chart, and "Our Love", which peaked at #43 on the Hot Soul Singles chart. Another single released, "Part Time Lover, Full Time Fool", failed to chart.

== Track listing ==
Side one
No.	Title	Writer(s)	Length
1.	"The Man I Love"	George Gershwin, Ira Gershwin	2:25
2.	"We Did It"	Johnny Moore	2:19
3.	"Our Love"	Chuck Jackson, Marvin Yancy	3:09
4.	"Can I Change My Mind"	Carl Wolfolk, Barry Despenza	2:40
5.	"Part Time Lover, Full Time Fool"	Floyd Smith	4:03

Side two
No.	Title	Writer(s)	Length
6.	"So Can I"	Sam Dees	3:20
7.	"Only a Fool"	Floyd Smith, William Johnson	2:25
8.	"Love Woke Me Up"	Nickolas Ashford, Valerie Simpson	2:45
9.	"Mother of Shame"	Jesse Lewis, Sam Dees, Cleveland Yelder	2:41
10.	"Remember Me"	Clyde Otis, Van McCoy	2:04

== Production ==
- Floyd Smith – producer
- Mike Terry – arranger
- Ken Laxton – engineer
- Wayne Neuendorf, Glenn Meadows, Milan Bogdan – remix engineers
- James Flournoy Holmes, David "Worm" Holmes – album design & photography

== Charts ==
Singles

Year	Single	Peaks
Year	Single	US R&B
1973	"Mother of Shame"	63
1973	"Our Love"	43
