= Crown Prince Waterford =

American singer

- Also known as: Charlie Waterford
- Born: Solomon Charles Waterford; October 26, 1916; Jonesboro, Arkansas, United States
- Died: February 1, 2007 (aged 90) Jacksonville, Florida, US
- Genres: Jazz, blues
- Occupation: Singer
- Years active: c.1935-early 1960s, 2002
- Labels: Philo, Hy-Tone, Aladdin, Capitol, Excello, Orbit

Solomon Charles Waterford (October 26, 1916 – February 1, 2007), known as Crown Prince Waterford, was an American jazz and blues singer who recorded in the 1940s and 1950s with Jay McShann, Pete Johnson and others.

== Life ==
Charles Waterford was born in Jonesboro, Arkansas, and was encouraged in his singing career by his parents, who were musicians. By his late teens he was living in Oklahoma City, and in 1936 sang there with Leslie Sheffield's Rhythmaires, a band that included guitarist Charlie Christian, bassist Abe Bolar and drummer Monk McFay. After auditioning in Chicago for Andy Kirk's 12 Clouds of Joy, he joined that band and performed with them as a blues shouter in the late 1930s and early 1940s. He also spent some time in the US Army during the Second World War.

By 1944 he was appearing regularly in Chicago nightclubs. He joined Jay McShann's band as a replacement for vocalist Walter Brown, and recorded several tracks with the band for the Philo label in Los Angeles, including "Crown Prince Boogie," after which he started billing himself as "The Crown Prince Of The Blues". He was replaced in McShann's band after a few months by Jimmy Witherspoon, and returned to Chicago. Around August 1946, credited as "Crown Prince" Charlie Waterford, he recorded his own "Girl Friend Blues" for the Hy-Tone label there, with Freddie Williams' band. The following year he recorded for Aladdin and Capitol in Los Angeles, in the latter case with a band led by Maxwell Davis that featured pianist Pete Johnson. His tracks included the salacious "Move Your Hand Baby".

He recorded for King Records in Cincinnati in 1949, with both Harold Land and his All-Stars and Joe Thomas, but later only recorded intermittently. He recorded for Excello in 1959, and in the early 1960s attempted to cash in on the twist craze with recordings for the Orbit label credited to "Crown Prince Waterford and his Twistologists". As new musical styles developed, he gave up the music business, and was ordained as the Rev. Charles Waterford in 1965. He set up several churches in northern Florida, and recorded a gospel album, The Reverend Waterford Sings.

After retiring from the ministry, he approached the organisers of the Springing The Blues festival in Jacksonville Beach, Florida, in 2002, and at the age of 85 performed there with a band led by pianist Jim McKaba. They also recorded and released an album, All Over But The Shoutin'.

Waterford died in Jacksonville in 2007, aged 90, and was buried at Florida National Cemetery, Bushnell.

== Discography ==
=== Compilation album ===
- Shoutin' The Blues - Complete recordings with Jay McShan and Pete Johnson, Oldie Blues (1985)
