= Dreamin' (Loleatta Holloway song) =

Single by Loleatta Holloway

from the album Loleatta
- A-side: "Worn Out Broken Heart"
- Released: 1977
- Recorded: 1976
- Genre: Rhythm and blues, disco
- Length: 3:05 (7" version); 6:17 (Album version)
- Label: Gold Mind
- Songwriter(s): Allan Felder, Norman Harris, Ron Tyson
- Producer(s): Norman Harris

"Dreamin'" is a 1977 disco single by American singer Loleatta Holloway and the Salsoul Orchestra. It was written by Allan Felder, Norman Harris, Ron Tyson. The single was a track from the album Loleatta and along with the tracks "Hit and Run" and "Ripped Off", went to #3 on the disco chart. "Dreamin'" also peaked at #72 on the Hot 100, and was the B-side to her ballad, "Worn Out Broken Heart", which went to number #25 on the soul chart.

== 2000 recording ==
- In 2000, a new remixed version of "Dreamin'" was recorded by Holloway, this version went to number one on the dance charts.

== Charts ==
Chart (1977)	Peak position
Billboard Hot 100	72

Chart (1994)	Peak position
UK Club Chart (Music Week)	91

Chart (2000)	Peak position
UK Singles (OCC)	59
US Hot Dance Club Play (Billboard)	1

== See also ==
- List of number-one dance singles of 2000 (U.S.)
