= Strike It Up =

1991 single by Black Box

Single by Black Box

from the album Dreamland
- Released: 6 February 1991
- Studio: The Record Classics (Italy)
- Genre: House; diva house; Eurodance
- Length: 3:22 (DJ Lelewel remix edit); 3:30 (original remix edit); 5:15 (album version)
- Label: Groove Groove Melody
- Songwriters: Daniele Davoli; Mirko Limoni; Valerio Semplici
- Producer: Groove Groove Melody

Black Box singles chronology
"The Total Mix" (1991)	"Strike It Up" (1991)	"Open Your Eyes" (1991)

Music video
- "Strike It Up" on YouTube

Alternative cover
- CD maxi - Megaremix

"Strike It Up" is a song by Italian music group Black Box with songwriter and rapper Linton Bennett (also known as "Lee 'Stepz' Bennett") on vocals. It was the fifth single from their debut studio album, Dreamland (1990), and was released on 6 February 1991. It was a success on many charts, including the Billboard Hot 100 in the United States, where it peaked at number eight. "Strike It Up" also was a top-10 hit in Denmark, Greece, Ireland, Israel, and the Netherlands. The accompanying music video was directed by Neil Thompson. In 2020, Slant Magazine ranked the song number 35 in its list of "The 100 Best Dance Songs of All Time".

== Background ==
The song features an uncredited Martha Wash on lead vocals. However, Wash was not featured in the music video or singles cover art as it was customary for Katrin Quinol, a French model, of Guadelope descent, to be used as the 'face' of the group, and it was her that was featured lipsynching the lyrics sung by Wash. In 1990, after suing over false advertising, Wash reached an out-of-court settlement with Black Box record label RCA, with financial compensation and a guarantee of proper credit in the future.

== Critical reception ==
Larry Flick from Billboard magazine wrote, "Not even the litigation alleging Martha Wash is the actual singer of group's hits can cool interest in this Italo-house act. Busy rave bears marks similar to previous hits, with a cute (and uncredited) rap adding a street vibe." The Daily Vault's Michael R. Smith wrote in his retrospective review of Dreamland, that "Strike It Up" and "Everybody Everybody" "are definitely the best of the album. These are gay disco anthems that still resonate today, even though the words aren't always easy to comprehend." Dave Sholin from the Gavin Report reported, "Back in the batter's box with a dynamic dance entry featuring the exceptional vocals of Martha Wash, they jump 24-15 at HOT 97 New York where APD/MD Kevin McCabe proclaims it, "one of our secret weapon records."

Andrew Smith from Melody Maker called it "a commendably rootsy house pumper". Alan Jones from Music Week named it Pick of the Week, stating that it has the "usual enrgetic vocal delivery from Martha Wash nicely counterpointed by Stepz's rap. Should strike deep into the Top 40." Davydd Chong from Record Mirror said, "Needless to say, this is hedonism-a-go-go, slapped onto a seven-inch lump of plastic by the Italian mob. Dead groovy, though not as smart as 'Everybody'. I like it lots." Marc Andrews from Smash Hits declared the song as "pure disco magic". In his book In Pista!, Italian writer Rocco Bargioni calls it “an overdose of urban sounds,” adding “I dare you to stay still while listening to it”.

== Impact and legacy ==
This song has been played during the final TV timeout in the third period at every New York Rangers home game since at least 1996. It is during this song that Rangers fan Larry Goodman, also known as "Dancing Larry," performs his signature dance, to energize the crowd. In 2010, Pitchfork included the song in their list of "Ten Actually Good 90s Jock Jams". In 2017, BuzzFeed ranked "Strike It Up" number 57 in its list of "The 101 Greatest Dance Songs of the '90s". In 2020, Slant Magazine ranked the song at number 35 in its list of "The 100 Best Dance Songs of All Time". It added that "it can be guiltlessly admitted that 'Strike It Up' is a masterpiece, and it's hard to imagine anyone else's voice [than Martha Wash] rising above the song's battalion of piano house, synth stabs, and, yes, one gigantic 4/4 beat." In 2024, Billboard ranked "Strike It Up" number 29 in their "The 100 Greatest Jock Jams of All Time", naming it "an early-’90s diva-house classic with a fantastic Martha Wash vocal".

== Track listings ==
- 7-inch single
1. "Strike It Up" (DJ Lelewel mix) – 5:05
2. "Strike It Up" (Sensitive Mix) – 3:35
- 12-inch maxi
1. "Strike It Up" (Original Mix) – 5:58
2. "Strike It Up" (DJ Lelewel Mix) – 5:05
3. "Strike It Up" (Hardcore Remix) – 3:20
- CD maxi
1. "Strike It Up" (Radio Edit) – 3:30
2. "Strike It Up" (Sensitive Mix) – 3:35
3. "Strike It Up" (Original Mix) – 5:58
4. "Strike It Up" (Hardcore Remix) – 3:20
- 12-inch maxi – Megaremix
1. "Strike It Up" (DJ Lelewel Mix) – 5:05
2. "Strike It Up" (Hardcore Remix) – 3:20
3. "Ride on Time" (The Bright On Mix) – 4:28
4. "Strike It Up" (Sensitive Mix) – 3:35
- CD maxi – Megaremix
1. "Strike It Up" (DJ Lelewel Mix) – 5:05
2. "Ride on Time" (The Bright On Mix) – 4:28
3. "Strike It Up" (Hardcore Remix) – 3:20
4. "Strike It Up" (Sensitive Mix) – 3:35

== Charts ==
=== Weekly charts ===
Chart (1991)	Peak position
Australia (ARIA)	20
Austria (Ö3 Austria Top 40)	27
Belgium (Ultratop 50 Flanders)	13
Canada Top Singles (RPM)	35
Canada Dance/Urban (RPM)	1
Denmark (IFPI)	10
Europe (Eurochart Hot 100)	38
Finland (Suomen virallinen lista)	13
France (SNEP)	26
Germany (GfK)	26
Greece (IFPI)	9
Ireland (IRMA)	8
Israel (Israeli Singles Chart)	8
Netherlands (Dutch Top 40)	7
Netherlands (Single Top 100)	4
New Zealand (Recorded Music NZ)	29
UK Singles (Official Charts)	16
UK Airplay (Music Week)	14
UK Dance (Music Week)	14
UK Club Chart (Record Mirror)	7
US Billboard Hot 100	8
US 12-inch Singles Sales (Billboard)	2
US Dance Club Play (Billboard)	1
US Hot R&B Singles (Billboard)	16
US Cash Box Top 100	14

=== Year-end charts ===
Chart (1991)	Position
Canada Dance/Urban (RPM)	6
Netherlands (Dutch Top 40)	51
Netherlands (Single Top 100)	50
UK Club Chart (Record Mirror)	65
US Billboard Hot 100	88
US 12-inch Singles Sales (Billboard)	9
US Dance Club Play (Billboard)	5

== Release history ==
Region	Date	Format(s)	Label(s)	Ref.
Germany	6 February 1991	7-inch vinyl; 12-inch vinyl; CD	Polydor	
United Kingdom	25 March 1991	7-inch vinyl; 12-inch vinyl; CD; cassette	Deconstruction	
Australia	29 April 1991	12-inch vinyl; cassette	Deconstruction; RCA	

== See also ==
- List of number-one dance singles of 1991 (U.S.)
- List of RPM number-one dance singles of 1991
