= Carry On (Martha Wash song) =

Single by Martha Wash

from the album Martha Wash
- Released: October 30, 1992
- Recorded: 1992
- Studio: Nervous Music and Platinum Island Recording Studios (New York City, New York)
- Genre: Dance-pop; gospel; house
- Length: 4:16
- Label: RCA
- Songwriter: Eric Beall
- Producers: Eric Beall; Steve Skinner

Martha Wash singles chronology
"Carry On" (1992)	"Give It to You" (1993)

Music video
- "Carry On" on YouTube

"Carry On" is a song by American singer Martha Wash, released on October 30, 1992 through RCA Records as the lead single from her debut solo self-titled studio album, Martha Wash (1993). It was written by Eric Beall, who also composed the instrumentation in collaboration with Steve Skinner and peaked at number-one on the US Billboard Hot Dance Club Play chart. In 2023, Rolling Stone included "Carry On" in their list of "The 50 Most Inspirational LGBTQ Songs of All Time".

== Release ==
The single was the first release from her self-titled debut album, Martha Wash, which was part of her settlement deal with RCA Records after she sued the label over being uncredited for her work on previous songs by Black Box. The track was her first number-one single as a solo artist on the US Billboard Hot Dance Club Play chart, reaching the top spot on December 5, 1992. In Europe, "Carry On" was a top-40 hit in the Netherlands and a top-50 hit in the UK. Wash told Billboard magazine in 1994, "I was really excited abut having a No. 1 song on Billboard's Maxi-Singles Sales Dance chart with 'Carry On'. It gave me a sense of added value and credibility as a recording artist, especially as it went to No. 1 in my own name."

== Critical reception ==
Alex Henderson from AllMusic complimented the song as a "dance-floor gem", describing it as "soaring". Larry Flick from Billboard magazine wrote, "After building a near-legendary reputation as a belter on hits by Black Box, C & C Music Factory, and the Weather Girls, it's difficult to believe that this is Wash's first solo recording. Regardless, she proves why she will always be the prototype for future dance music divas on this driven pop/dance romp. It almost doesn't even matter what she's singing; any chance to wonder at the power of her voice is worth taking. Fortunately, this song works just fine, and is roping in club DJs at a rapid rate. Watch radio to quickly follow suit."

Caroline Sullivan from The Guardian said in her review of the Martha Wash album, "Things work best when her producer allows her gospel roots to emerge, as on the beautiful inspirational number 'Carry On'." Connie Johnson from Los Angeles Times felt the "gospel-driven" song "ranks among the best tracks she has recorded." A reviewer from Music Week gave it three out of five, declaring the song as "uplifting", and concluding that Wash "deserves success in her own". Andy Beevers from the Record Mirror Dance Update gave it a full score of five out of five and named it House Tune of the Week. He also complimented it as "a great, truly uplifting song". Gordon Chambers from Rolling Stone remarked that Wash "glides" on the track. Ian Hyland of Sunday Mirror gave it nine out of ten, writing, "Another one of those massive tunes that's been largin' it on the dance floor recently. Now you can have it at home."

== Usage in media ==
In 2010, the song was used in the fifth episode of season two of reality competition television series RuPaul's Drag Race, in which Wash also served as guest judge. Contestants Sahara Davenport and Morgan McMichaels, were up for elimination and had to lipsync to the song in order to continue in the competition. During the episode, drag queen and head judge RuPaul emotionally recounted "That song is very special to me because when my mother passed away, that was the song that I would play all the time. I played Martha Wash's 'Carry On' non-stop. That's what got me through it."

== Impact and legacy ==
British DJ Phil Asher named "Carry On" one of his favourites in 1995, "My ex-girlfriend brought it back from New York. I'm still playing it to this day, in fact I played it last night. It's a vocal anthem of the real kind – no handbags in sight." In 1996, English house music DJ Paulette named it one of her favourites, saying, "I play this track towards the end of the night. The lyrics are perfect — she is the voice." In 2023, Rolling Stone ranked "Carry On" number 47 in their list of "The 50 Most Inspirational LGBTQ Songs of All Time", noting that "the gospel-inspired, '90s house track [...] has become beloved by the queer community for its soaring melody and unwaveringly hopeful lyrics."

== Track listings ==
- CD maxi, US
1. "Carry On" (Original 7" Edit) — 3:30
2. "Carry On" (Album Radio Mix) — 4:17
3. "Carry On" (Masters At Work 7" Mix) — 4:10
4. "Carry On" (Masters At Work 12" Dance Mix) — 6:46
5. "Carry On" (Masters At Work Dub Mix) — 5:14
6. "Carry On" (Carried Away Dub) — 7:08
7. "Carry On" (Carry This 12" Dance Mix) — 5:26
8. "Carry On" (Vocal Bass Dub Mix) — 5:59
9. "Carry On" (12" Alternative Mix) — 7:26

== Charts ==
=== Weekly charts ===
Chart (1992–1993)	Peak position
Australia (ARIA)	149
Netherlands (Dutch Top 40)	36
Netherlands (Single Top 100)	38
UK Singles (OCC)	49
UK Dance (Music Week)	8
UK Club Chart (Music Week)	9
US Dance Club Songs (Billboard)	1
US Hot Dance Music/Maxi-Singles Sales (Billboard)	1
US Hot R&B/Hip-Hop Songs (Billboard)	97

Chart (1997)	Peak position
Scotland (OCC)	68
UK Singles (OCC)	49
UK Dance (OCC)	2
UK Club Chart (Music Week)	1

=== Year-end charts ===
Chart (1992)	Position
UK Club Chart (Music Week)	81

Chart (1993)	Position
Netherlands (Dutch Top 40)	298

Chart (1997)	Position
UK Club Chart (Music Week)	19

== See also ==
- List of number-one dance singles of 1992 (U.S.)
