= Hy-Tone Records =

Hy-Tone was an influential independent record label in Chicago that issued rhythm and blues records between 1946 and 1948.

== History ==
It was originally set up in March 1946 as the Melody Lane label by guitarist, bandleader and record store owner Freddie Williams (1898-1955), but soon changed its name to Hy-Tone when Russian-born juke box operator Nathan Rothner (1912-2003) became involved. The label recorded musicians mainly from the South Side of Chicago, and issued early recordings by Memphis Slim, Crown Prince Waterford, Jo Jo Adams, Sunnyland Slim, guitarist Floyd Smith, gospel singer R. L. Knowles, Freddie Williams' own band, and others.

The label is credited with helping to establish Chicago as a recording venue for R&B music after the Second World War. It closed in 1948 after King Records in Cincinnati bought some of the Hi-Tone master recordings from Rothner.

== Other labels ==
The name Hy-Tone, Hytone, or Hi-Tone has been used for several other, unrelated, record labels. These include:

- Hytone, set up by the Indestructible Phonograph Company in 1921
- Hi-Tone, set up in New York in 1949 as a subsidiary of Bob Thiele's Signature Records
- Hy-Tone, set up in New York in 1957
- Hy-Tone, which issued gospel records in California in the 1960s.
