= I Don't Know Anybody Else =

1990 single by Black Box

Single by Black Box

from the album Dreamland
- Released: 1990
- Genre: Italo house
- Length: 4:36; 4:10 (sample free mix video edit)
- Label: Groove Groove Melody
- Songwriters: Daniele Davoli; Mirko Limoni; Valerio Semplici
- Producer: Groove Groove Melody

Black Box singles chronology
"Ride on Time" (1989)	"I Don't Know Anybody Else" (1990)	"Everybody Everybody" (1990)

Music video
- "I Don't Know Anybody Else" on YouTube

"I Don't Know Anybody Else" is a song by Italian music group Black Box. It was released as the second single from their debut album, Dreamland (1990), in early 1990, by label Groove Groove Melody. The single became a chart hit, including Ireland, Switzerland, Norway and the United Kingdom, where it reached the top five. The song features an uncredited Martha Wash on lead vocals, while Katrin Quinol lip-synches the vocals in its accompanying music video, directed by Judith Briant. The melody line in the intro resembles a section of "Love Sensation" by Loleatta Holloway, the original line being "Can't you see that I love nobody else".

== Critical reception ==
Upon the release, Larry Flick from Billboard magazine stated that here, the "groove remains in trendy Italo-house vein with diva-styled vocals fueling the fire of tune's brain-imbedding hook." A reviewer from Cash Box wrote that the group "who surprised everyone by breaking out of clubs and onto the pop charts clocks in with its second single, driven by the same intense vocals and formidable house groove that skyrocketed its U.S. debut single, 'Everybody, Everybody'." Bob Stanley from Melody Maker commented, "After Technotronic's hugely disappointing soundalike sequel, this is a far better proposition. But then it's from a far better source. And, no, the voice doesn't grate anything like as much and, as long as the public can put up with another dance record that has "touch me" as a hookline, this is a surefire Number One." Another Melody Maker editor, Andrew Smith, said it's "the one that lures me away from the bar time after time, with its powerfully compelling house rhythm and transcendent melody."

Gene Sandbloom from The Network Forty felt the song "has every bit the house power, but this time lead vocalist Katrin Quinol kicks off with an Annie Lennox intro that leaves you almost exhausted after four minutes." David Quantick from NME said, "It ain't 'Ride on Time' sadly, although a lot of other records this year are. It is fairly OK, even if it does boast a "Sample Free Mix" (this may be a joke). Main probs; not fast enough and lacking a loud woman shouting excitingly." Chris Heath from Smash Hits felt it's "exceedingly similar" to "Ride on Time", and complimented it as "slightly brilliant".

== Chart performance ==
"I Don't Know Anybody Else" entered the top 10 in Austria, Finland, France, Ireland, Norway, Sweden, Switzerland and the United Kingdom, as well as on the Eurochart Hot 100, where it reached number five. In the UK, the single peaked at number four during its second week on the UK Singles Chart, on 18 February 1990. Additionally, it was a top 20-hit in Italy and West Germany and a top-30 hit in the Netherlands. Outside Europe, it peaked at number one on the US Billboard Dance Club Play chart and entered the top 10 in Australia, where it peaked at number six and was awarded a gold record after 35,000 singles were shipped there. In New Zealand, it reached number 25. In West Asia, "I Don't Know Anybody Else" became a top-10 hit also in Israel, peaking at number ten on 18 March 1990.

== Retrospective response ==
In 2009, the Daily Vault's Michael R. Smith described it as "effective and timeless" in his review of Dreamland, and added that it now "sound fresher and fuller of life than ever." Vibe magazine listed the song at number 11 in their list of "Before EDM: 30 Dance Tracks from the '90s That Changed the Game" in 2013. They wrote that the song "helped propel Italian house group Black Box into international fame thanks to the track's strong vocals (exhibited by Martha Wash) fused with beats laid down by club DJ Daniele Davoli and keyboard wiz Mirko Limoni".

== Music video ==
A music video was made for "I Don't Know Anybody Else", directed by Judith Briant. It features the group performing the song in a club. Briant also directed the video for "Ride on Time" (with Greg Copeland). "I Don't Know Anybody Else" was later made available on Black Box' official YouTube channel in 2009, and had generated more than 12 million views as of late 2025.

For the US release, the video was re-edited. Visual effects and animations were added on-screen, along with pictures from a Katrin Quinol photoshoot that was later used as the single cover.

== Track listings ==
- US 12-inch single and CD maxi
1. "I Don't Know Anybody Else" (We Got Salsoul mix) – 5:40
2. "I Don't Know Anybody Else" (DJ Lelewel mix) – 6:47
3. "I Don't Know Anybody Else" (a cappella) – 3:40
4. "I Don't Know Anybody Else" (Hurley's house mix) – 7:00
5. "I Don't Know Anybody Else" (Hurley's house dub) – 5:08
6. "I Don't Know Anybody Else" (Deephouse instrumental) – 4:30
- UK CD single
1. "I Don't Know Anybody Else" (7-inch) – 4:15
2. "I Don't Know Anybody Else" (House club/Free Sample mix) – 6:17
3. "Ride on Time" (original mix) – 4:10
- UK 7-inch single
1. "I Don't Know Anybody Else" (edit one) – 4:10
2. "I Don't Know Anybody Else" (edit two) – 3:30
- UK first 12-inch maxi
1. "I Don't Know Anybody Else" (Melody mix/Sample Free mix) (w/o count-in) – 6:33
2. "I Don't Know Anybody Else" (House club/Free Sample mix) – 6:15
- UK second 12-inch maxi
1. "I Don't Know Anybody Else" (We Got Salsoul mix) – 5:40
2. "Ride on Time" (Massive mix) – 4:10
3. "I Don't Know Anybody Else" (DJ Lelewel mix) – 6:47
- Italian 12-inch maxi
1. "I Don't Know Anybody Else" (Melody mix/Sample Free mix) – 6:36
2. "I Don't Know Anybody Else" (House club/Free Sample mix) – 6:15
- Italian 7-inch single
1. "I Don't Know Anybody Else" (LP version) – 4:30
2. "I Don't Know Anybody Else" (House club edit) – 4:00

== Charts ==
=== Weekly charts ===
Chart (1990–1991)	Peak position
Australia (ARIA)	6
Austria (Ö3 Austria Top 40)	10
Belgium (Ultratop 50 Flanders)	21
Canada Top Singles (RPM)	87
Canada Dance/Urban (RPM)	6
Europe (Eurochart Hot 100)	5
Finland (Suomen virallinen lista)	1
France (SNEP)	9
Ireland (IRMA)	2
Israel (Israeli Singles Chart)	10
Italy (Musica e dischi)	12
Italy Airplay (Music & Media)	12
Luxembourg (Radio Luxembourg)	2
Netherlands (Dutch Top 40)	37
Netherlands (Single Top 100)	25
New Zealand (Recorded Music NZ)	9
Norway (VG-lista)	4
Sweden (Sverigetopplistan)	8
Switzerland (Schweizer Hitparade)	3
UK Singles (Official Charts)	4
UK Dance (Music Week)	2
US Billboard Hot 100	23
US 12-inch Singles Sales (Billboard)	1
US Dance Club Songs (Billboard)	1
US Hot R&B/Hip-Hop Songs (Billboard)	10
US Cash Box Top 100	49
West Germany (GfK)	12

=== Year-end charts ===
Chart (1990)	Position
Australia (ARIA)	49
Europe (Eurochart Hot 100)	31
Germany (Media Control)	69
New Zealand (RIANZ)	49
Sweden (Topplistan)	42
Switzerland (Schweizer Hitparade)	18

Chart (1991)	Position
Canada Dance/Urban (RPM)	47
US 12-inch Singles Sales (Billboard)	4
US Dance Club Play (Billboard)	2
US Hot R&B Singles (Billboard)	96

== Certifications and sales ==
Region	Certification	Certified units/sales
Australia (ARIA)	Gold	35,000^{^}
^{^} Shipments figures based on certification alone.

== Release history ==
Region	Date	Format(s)	Label(s)	Ref.
Europe	1990	—N/a	Polydor	
Australia	12 March 1990	7-inch vinyl; 12-inch vinyl; cassette	Deconstruction; RCA	
Japan	16 December 1990	Mini-CD	RCA	

== See also ==
- List of number-one dance singles of 1991 (U.S.)
