= Give It to You (Martha Wash song) =

Single by Martha Wash

from the album Martha Wash
- Released: January 8, 1993
- Recorded: 1992
- Genre: Dance-pop; house
- Length: 3:49
- Label: RCA
- Songwriter: Brian Alexander Morgan
- Producer: Brian Alexander Morgan

Martha Wash singles chronology
"Carry On" (1992)	"Give It to You" (1993)	"Runaround" (1993)

Music video
- "Give It to You" on YouTube

"Give It to You" is a song recorded by American singer-songwriter Martha Wash and the second release from her self-titled debut album, Martha Wash (1992). The song is the follow-up single to "Carry On", and is written and produced by Brian Alexander Morgan. Released in January 1993 by RCA Records, it would be her second number-one single on the US Billboard Dance Club Songs chart, reaching the top spot on April 3, 1993. It also became a modest crossover hit on the Billboard Hot 100 and Cash Box Top 100, peaking at numbers 90 and 91, same year. The accompanying music video was directed by German director Marcus Nispel, featuring Wash performing in a castle, surrounded by shirtless male dancers.

== Critical reception ==
Larry Flick from Billboard magazine wrote, "Second shot from Wash's self-titled solo debut has more of a Black Box vibe than her recent No. 1 hit, 'Carry On'. The hook is simply irresistible, while the bass line firmly supports shoulder-shaking backup vocals and a plethora of cool keyboard effects. As always, Wash's one-of-a-kind soprano is the shining light of this track." Randy Clark from Cash Box described it as "a rather simple, cliched melody with its repetitious, discotheque beat". In his weekly UK chart commentary, James Masterton deemed it "a fairly standard piece of jack swing soul". Ralph Tee from Music Week's RM Dance Update commented, "Martha opens her lungs and belts out the song with vitality and excitement, reflecting the urgency and uplifting quality of the music. An exceptional house track."

== Impact and legacy ==
In 1996, British DJ duo Sharp Boyz named the song one of their favourites. George Mitchell said, "When I first heard this I had to buy two copies, it's a classic diva track. You need two copies so you can play them back to back." Steven React added, "She's one of the best vocalists in the world."

== Track listings ==
- CD maxi (US)
1. "Give It to You" (Top 40 Version by Dennis Ferrante and Kenny Ortiz) — 3:06
2. "Give It to You" (Maurice's Mix) — 3:53
3. "Give It to You" (Morales' Mix) — 3:49
4. "Give It to You" (LP Version) — 3:49
- 2x12" single (US)
1. "Give It to You" (Momo's Klub Mix) — 6:44
2. "Give It to You" (Dead Zone Mix) — 5:42
3. "Give It to You" (Maurice's Klub Mix) — 6:48
4. "Give It to You" (Kaoz Klub Mix) — 6:24
5. "Give It to You" (Def Dub Mix) — 6:25
6. "Give It to You" (Momo's Dub Mix) — 7:34
7. "Give It to You" (Maurice's Underground Playground) — 7:25
8. "Give It to You" (Kaoz Dub It to You Mix) — 6:35
9. "Give It to You" (Top 40 Version) — 3:06

== Charts ==
=== Weekly charts ===
Chart (1993)	Peak position
Australia (ARIA)	179
Canada Dance/Urban (RPM)	4
Europe (European Dance Radio)	4
Netherlands (Dutch Top 40 Tipparade)	8
Netherlands (Dutch Single Tip)	16
UK Singles (OCC)	37
UK Dance (Music Week)	2
UK Club Chart (Music Week)	1
US Billboard Hot 100	90
US Dance Club Songs (Billboard)	1
US Hot R&B/Hip-Hop Songs (Billboard)	48
US Maxi-Singles Sales (Billboard)	1
US Radio Songs (Billboard)	75
US Cash Box Top 100	91

=== Year-end charts ===
Chart (1993)	Position
Canada Dance/Urban (RPM)	29
UK Club Chart (Music Week)	14
