= Everybody Everybody =

1990 single by Black Box

- German maxi single cover

Single by Black Box

from the album Dreamland
- B-side: "Dreamland"
- Released: 1990
- Recorded: 1989
- Genre: House; pop; Eurodisco
- Length: 5:20
- Label: RCA
- Songwriters: Daniele Davoli; Mirko Limoni; Valerio Semplici
- Producer: Groove Groove Melody

Black Box singles chronology
"I Don't Know Anybody Else" (1989)	"Everybody Everybody" (1990)	"Fantasy" (1990)

Music video
- "Everybody Everybody" on YouTube

"Everybody Everybody" is a song by the Italian house music group Black Box, from their debut studio album, Dreamland (1990). The song was written by Daniele Davoli, Mirko Limoni, and Valerio Semplici, while produced by Groove Groove Melody. It was released by RCA Records as the third single from the album. The house, pop and Eurodisco song consists of an organ, drums, horns, and strings. "Everybody Everybody" contains a sample of Larry Blackmon's vocals and a drum loop from Bobby Byrd's 1987 remix of James Brown's song "Hot Pants" (1971).

The song contains uncredited vocals by American singer Martha Wash. French model Katrin Quinol was presented as the credited vocalist and made several appearances with Black Box, which led Wash to file a lawsuit against the group.

"Everybody Everybody" received generally positive reviews from music critics, who praised the production and vocals. The song peaked at number eight on the US Billboard Hot 100, number 10 on the New Zealand Singles Chart, and at number 16 on the UK Singles Chart. An accompanying music video was released in 1990, which depicts Katrin Quinol lip synching the song in a unitard.

== Background and controversy ==
In 1989, Martha Wash was approached by Black Box, then known as Groove Groove Melody, to record demos for other musicians in exchange for a flat fee payment. Wash recorded vocals for the songs in a five-day period, which were kept in six of nine songs from the group's debut studio album Dreamland (1990). However, she was not credited on the album's liner notes as French fashion model Katrin Quinol was brought in to phonetically learn the songs on Dreamland for seven months despite not knowing the English language, and made several appearances as part of the group. Black Box's record label RCA Records continuously stated that Quinol was the lead vocalist of each song, in response to publications such as Billboard and The New York Times insisting that another singer appeared on the album.

On 21 November 1990, several consumer class action lawsuits were issued in the Los Angeles Federal District Court relating to Milli Vanilli and Black Box. RCA Records initially believed that the vocals in Black Box's music belonged to Quinol, who was seen in the group's promotional material. Wash sued the Black Box members in September 1990 for false advertising and uncredited vocals, but was settled out-of-court in December 1990. She eventually signed an eight-year contract with the record label to record eight individual albums, in addition to a financed national tour. RCA Records additionally recognised Wash as the "principal voice" on Dreamland and insisted that Black Box's producers were the cause of her "discrimination".

== Composition and critical reception ==
"Everybody Everybody" is a house, pop, and Eurodisco song, which contains a "house-inspired rhythmic base", a syncopated drum loop from Bobby Byrd's 1987 remix of James Brown's song "Hot Pants" (1971), and a roller rink-styled organ. It uses horns and strings to create a "disco-era influence", which Billboard staff compared to the atmosphere of Studio 54. According to the song's sheet music that was published on Musicnotes.com, it is set in the time signature of 4/4 common time, with a tempo of 118 beats per minute, while composed in the key of F minor. Wash's voice on the track ranges from the low note of A♭_{3} to the high note of F_{5}, while the song is constructed in verse–chorus form. A sample of Cameo lead singer Larry Blackmon's vocals is periodically used throughout the song, where an "ow" is heard in the lyrics. Wash performs a gospel-influenced belt, as Marisa Fox of Entertainment Weekly described her vocals as "grand-diva"-styled over the song's "roaring sound".

Billboard writer Bill Coleman described "Everybody Everybody" as "thoroughly contagious" and stated that the vocals and lyrics are "uplifting". John Leland of Newsday stated that the song is the "dance-party anthem of the season". Writing for The Network Forty, Yvette Ziraldo opined that the production is "infectious", while Chris Heath of Smash Hits declared it as "almost brilliant". Ernest Hardy of Cashbox complimented the song's "raw vocal" alongside the production's "relentless groove", but noted the similar sound with Black Box's previous singles "Ride on Time" and "I Don't Know Anybody Else". NME writer Roger Morton praised the song as a successor to "Ride on Time" with its "burnished gold vocal[s]", but recognized that they were lip-synched.

== Commercial performance and music video ==
In June 1990, "Everybody Everybody" appeared in dance clubs, with its popularity resulting in airplay on urban contemporary and contemporary hit radio stations. In the United States, the song peaked at number eight on the Billboard Hot 100 chart dated 20 October 1990, where it remained for 19 weeks. It also topped the Dance Club Songs chart issued 21 July 1990, and charted for 10 weeks. On the 3 June 1990, issue of the UK Singles Chart, "Everybody Everybody" peaked at number 16 and charted for six weeks. The song bowed at number 35 on the Australian ARIA Singles Chart, and reached number 11 on the New Zealand Singles Chart. In West Asia, it became a top-10 hit in Israel, peaking at number six on 1 July 1990. It stayed for two weeks at that position.

An accompanying music video for "Everybody Everybody" was released, which depicts Quinol squatting while wearing a unitard and lip synching the song's vocals. In late 1990, Wash saw the music video and called her manager after realising that she was uncredited on the song. She described Quinol's appearance as being "[six]-feet tall, very skinny [with] cobalt-blue eyes" and suggested that such models were utilised in various music videos as "props". Writing for the St. Petersburg Times, Jean Carey considered the video to be "lame" and wrote that it "encourage[d] the rumors" about "the group's mystery vocalist".

== Legacy ==
In 2009, Blender staff ranked "Everybody Everybody" number 335 on their "500 Greatest Songs Since You Were Born" list and described it as "criminally buoyant" for "drunk wedding guests" to dance to. In 2010, Pitchfork writer David Raposa ranked the song on their list of "Top 200 Tracks of the 1990s" at number 171, stating that the Cameo sample distinguished it from other "pop-house bandwagoners". In 2017, BuzzFeed staff ranked it number 14 on their "101 Greatest Dance Songs of the '90s" list. Billboard magazine ranked "Everybody Everybody" number 457 in their "Top Songs of the '90s". In 2022, Rolling Stone staff ranked the song number 194 on their "200 Greatest Dance Songs of All Time" list. In March 2025, Billboard staff ranked it number 41 in their list of "The 100 Best Dance Songs of All Time", writing, "Still, it's Wash's burn-the-house-down performance that elevates the otherwise kitschy to something iconic."

== In popular culture ==
Dominican-American group Proyecto Uno covered the song under the title "Todo El Mundo", with Remezcla writer Cheky acknowledging that it connected with "Black-American culture" and made the merenhouse genre prevalent.

A cutaway segment on the episode of American animated series Family Guy titled "Play It Again, Brian" included "Everybody Everybody", which was performed by the character Cleveland Brown. The segment was included on top-10 listicles by IGN and Screen Rant staff for highlights involving Brown. The song was played on the final episode of the FX series The People v. O. J. Simpson: American Crime Story, where The Seattle Times writer Tricia Romano compared the lyrics of Wash's vocals, "Sad and free", to O. J. Simpson's acquittal in the O. J. Simpson murder case. "Everybody Everybody" was included on the third season of American comedy drama series Master of None, as the characters Alicia and Denise danced to the song while doing laundry.

== Track listing ==
Canadian 12-inch single

Side A
No.	Title	Length
1.	"Everybody Everybody" (Le Freak Mix)	5:20
2.	"Everybody Everybody" (Le Freak Mix 7" Edit)	4:07

Side B
No.	Title	Length
1.	"Everybody Everybody" (Love Unlimited Edit)	3:58
2.	"Everybody Everybody" (Rockapella)	4:37
3.	"Everybody Everybody" (Le Freak Instrumental)	4:32

UK CD single

No.	Title	Length
1.	"Everybody Everybody" (Love Unlimited Edit)	3:58
2.	"Everybody Everybody" (Le Freak Mix)	5:20
3.	"Everybody Everybody" (Rockapella)	4:38
4.	"Everybody Everybody" (House Mix)	5:02

UK 12-inch single

Side A
No.	Title	Length
1.	"Everybody Everybody" (Le Freak Mix)	5:20

Side B
No.	Title	Length
1.	"Everybody Everybody" (Love Unlimited Edit)	3:58
2.	"Everybody Everybody" (Rockapella)	4:38

Australian cassette single (Love Unlimited Edit)

No.	Title	Length
1.	"Everybody Everybody" (Love Unlimited Edit)	3:58
2.	"Everybody Everybody" (Le Freak Instrumental)	4:32

West German maxi single 1

No.	Title	Length
1.	"Everybody Everybody" (Le Freak Mix)	5:20
2.	"Everybody Everybody" (Rockapella)	4:36
3.	"Everybody Everybody" (Instrumental)	4:48

West German maxi single 2

No.	Title	Length
1.	"Everybody Everybody" (Club Mix)	5:30
2.	"Everybody Everybody" (Rockapella)	4:36
3.	"Everybody Everybody" (Instrumental)	4:48

West German 7-inch single

No.	Title	Length
1.	"Everybody Everybody" (Love Unlimited Edit)	4:00
2.	"Everybody Everybody" (Le Freak Instrumental)	4:43

West German 12-inch single (House Special)

Side A
No.	Title	Length
1.	"Everybody Everybody" (House Special)	5:02

Side B
No.	Title	Length
1.	"Dreamland"	1:58
2.	"Everybody Everybody"	5:18

== Charts ==
=== Weekly charts ===
Weekly chart performance for "Everybody Everybody"
Chart (1990)	Peak position
Australia (ARIA)	35
Belgium (Ultratop 50 Flanders)	39
Europe (Eurochart Hot 100)	37
France (SNEP)	11
Israel (Israeli Singles Chart)	6
Italy (Musica e dischi)	7
Luxembourg (Radio Luxembourg)	11
Netherlands (Dutch Top 40)	32
Netherlands (Single Top 100)	29
New Zealand (Recorded Music NZ)	11
Switzerland (Schweizer Hitparade)	21
UK Singles (Official Charts)	16
US Billboard Hot 100	8
US Dance Club Songs (Billboard)	1
US Hot R&B/Hip-Hop Songs (Billboard)	2
US Cash Box Top 100	7
West Germany (GfK)	41

=== Year-end charts ===
Year-end chart performance for "Everybody Everybody"
Chart (1990)	Position
US Billboard Hot 100	81
US 12-inch Singles Sales (Billboard)	2
US Dance Club Play (Billboard)	24
US Hot R&B Singles (Billboard)	12
