= Ride on Time =

1989 single by Black Box

Single by Black Box

from the album Dreamland
- Released: 31 July 1989
- Genre: Italo house; Eurodance; diva house
- Length: 4:37 (album version); 4:10 (Massive mix edit)
- Label: Discomagic
- Songwriters: Daniele Davoli; Mirko Limoni; Valerio Semplici; Dan Hartman
- Producer: Groove Groove Melody

Black Box singles chronology
"Megamix" (1989)	"Ride on Time" (1989)	"I Don't Know Anybody Else" (1989)

Music video
- "Ride on Time" on YouTube

"Ride on Time" is a song by the Italian house group Black Box. It was released as a single in July 1989 and included on Black Box's debut album, Dreamland (1990).

The Black Box member Daniele Davioli described "Ride on Time" as an attempt to create a dance track with the power of a rock song. The first version used an unlicensed vocal sample from the 1980 single "Love Sensation" by Loleatta Holloway. After the copyright owners took legal action, the single was reissued with rerecorded vocals by Heather Small, who later became famous as the vocalist of M People. For television appearances, Black Box hired the model Katrin Quinol to mime the vocals.

In Italy, "Ride on Time" was released by Discomagic Records. In the UK, it was released by Deconstruction and popularised by the DJs Paul Oakenfold and Danny Rampling. It topped the UK singles chart for six weeks and became the UK's bestselling single of 1989. It also topped the charts in Iceland and Ireland, and entered the top 10 of several other European countries. "Ride on Time" has appeared in critics' lists of the best house tracks, and in 2020 The Guardian named it one of the greatest UK number ones.

== Recording ==
"Ride on Time" was written and produced by the Italian production team Groove Groove Melody, comprising Daniele Davoli, Mirko Limoni and Valerio Semplici. Davoli said that as Italian rock music was not taken seriously, "Ride on Time" was the group's attempt to create a song with the power of Led Zeppelin and Deep Purple with a dance beat.

In New York City, Davoli bought a 12-inch a cappella copy of "Love Sensation", a 1980 single by Loleatta Holloway, planning to use it to create mashups. In Italy, he was introduced to samplers and persuaded the club where he worked to buy an Akai S900 sampler. He created the first version of "Ride on Time" using the S900 to sample the "Love Sensation" vocals. Limoni added piano chords and additional vocal samples. The group also added a sample of the 1973 single "Love's Theme" by the Love Unlimited Orchestra. The basic backing track was finished in less than an hour, but it took weeks to finalise the ordering of the samples. The song title derives from the sampled lyric "right on time", which the group misheard as "ride on time".

== Release ==
Davoli tested "Ride on Time" in a club, but the audience responded poorly: "It was heartbreaking. The floor had 1,000 people dancing, and it cleared it." However, his bandmates assured him that it was "the wrong club". Black Box showed "Ride on Time" to numerous Italian record labels, but none were interested, feeling it did not match their markets. Davoli said the labels were more interested in hi-NRG records in the style of the British producers Stock Aitken Waterman, which they felt was dated. "Ride on Time" was eventually signed by Discomagic Records, who Davoli said "would release almost anything".

Shortly after the track was finished, the British DJs Paul Oakenfold and Danny Rampling visited Italy looking for Italo house music. They heard an early pressing of "Ride on Time" in a record shop, purchased all the copies and brought them to England. Around the same time, the UK record label Deconstruction contacted Discomagic to enquire about licensing Black Box's earlier track "Numero Uno", but it had been licensed to Beggars Banquet. Instead, Deconstruction licensed "Ride on Time" and released it with no promotion, competing with the imported copies arriving in UK record stores.

"Ride on Time" was included on Black Box's debut album, Dreamland (1990). In 2019, for the song's 30th anniversary, Black Box created a new mix in the style of a 1970s disco track.

=== Sampling dispute ===
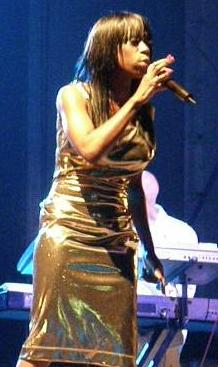
Heather Small, who later found fame as the vocalist of M People, provided a rerecorded vocal for "Ride on Time".

Deconstruction was concerned about clearing the "Love Sensation" sample, which was owned by Salsoul Records. Davoli mistakenly believed Holloway was dead and that sampling less than two seconds of copyrighted music without permission was legal. Dan Hartman, who wrote "Love Sensation", asked for a third of the royalties. Although Black Box initially baulked at the offer, they later learnt Hartman could have asked for 100% and Davoli said he had been "a true gentleman".

After negotiations worsened with Salsoul, BMG, which owned Deconstruction, had Black Box record a replacement vocal. The new vocalist was Heather Small, who later became famous as the singer of M People. Small was not told the purpose of the recording and recorded her vocals within an hour for a flat fee. According to Davoli, BMG were secretive about her identity with Black Box, saying it was "a singer doing them a favour, someone who hadn't released any music yet but was a big priority for BMG for the future". BMG refused to confirm Small had provided the vocal even after M People became successful.

Within a week of Small recording the vocal, Deconstruction withdrew the single and released a new version on the Ride on Time (Remix) EP. The EP counted towards sales of the song. Radio stations continued to play the original version, and it continued to appear on some versions of Dreamland and compilation albums.

According to several sources, Holloway reached a settlement for the use of the sample and was paid damages. However, Davoli said in 2018 that BMG had only paid Salsoul, the owner of the master. Holloway resented the episode, and said: "I've been around for years trying to get this one hit record. It annoyed me knowing that Black Box were number one and I was not getting any credit for it." She also expressed frustration that Black Box were paid more for performances than her, even after she was billed as "the voice of Black Box". Davoli said he regretted not meeting Holloway before her death in 2011, and would have liked to apologise. Black Box bought the rights to the "Love Sensation" sample in 2018.

== Miming ==
For their performance on the British music series Top of the Pops, Black Box hired the model Katrin Quinol to mime the vocals, as "none of us three blokes from Italy would be convincing replacements for Loleatta Holloway". Quinol also appeared in the music video and other performances. Davoli said, "You could tell those vocals didn't come from a slim girl like her. But she had a great influence on the public – she had the moves on stage and looked great and of the time."

The miming drew criticism, which surprised the group, as it was normal on Italian television. Davoli said he regretted using Quinol: "It was wrong. But in Italy, a lot of people used to sing on a record and labels would ask young people to become the image ... We looked at American and English artists and realised they don't do that." The group allowed Quinol to perform in Europe under the Black Box name.

== Chart performance ==
"Ride on Time" entered the UK singles chart at number 28 in the week of 12 August 1989. Boosted by demand for the import, it reached number one in its fifth week, on 3 September 1989. It topped the chart for six weeks and became the UK's bestselling single of 1989. Black Box were surprised by the success; Limoni said they had expected at best to sell 1,000 copies to be played in clubs.

"Ride on Time" reached number one in Iceland and Ireland, number two in Sweden and Greece, and entered the top ten in Austria, Belgium, Finland, France, Italy, Norway, Spain, Switzerland and West Germany. It reached number four on the Eurochart Hot 100, a chart based on the singles charts of 17 European countries. In Australia and New Zealand, "Ride on Time" reached number two. In the United States, it reached number 39 on the Dance Club Play chart. As of 2018, "Ride on Time" had been streamed over nine million times on Spotify. It is certified gold in Sweden, silver in France and platinum in Australia and the UK.

== Reception ==
Phil Cheeseman of Record Mirror wrote that "Ride on Time" was "splendid and instantly catchy ... Black Box have understood perfectly the piano-driven rhythms of Chicago and moulded them into a Euro-shape. This is dance music's answer to SAW." Chris Heath from Smash Hits declared it "quite brilliant". Reviewing Dreamland for Melody Maker, Andrew Smith wrote that the sampled vocals of "Ride on Time" were irritating. He and another critic, Bill Coleman from Billboard, argued that it was derivative of the 1988 S'Express single "Theme from S-Express". In 1993, NME named "Ride on Time" the third-best "Euro-hit", describing it as the "ultimate Italian house shouter" and "quintessential Europop". In 1994, Peter Paphides and Simon Price from Melody Maker named "Ride on Time" a modern classic and acknowledged it as "the day Hi-NRG's influence on modern dance became official".

The Daily Vault reviewer Michael R. Smith wrote in his 2009 review of Dreamland that he did not like "Ride on Time" when it became a hit, but now felt it was "effective and timeless" and that it sounded "fresher and fuller of life than ever". In 2010, Tom Ewing of Freaky Trigger described "Ride on Time" as "a series of peaks, with the union of 'Right on time!' and the piano riff the highest and most thrilling ... The trappings of Italo house – light, sequenced keyboard lines, bouncy bass, endless hi-hat all working in unison to give that gorgeous piano its lift – seemed to be on a hundred hits that summer, and the vocal hooks made this the biggest." In 2011, the journalist James Masterton wrote that Small's replacement vocal was "almost comically bad", with a noticeable Manchester accent. He lamented that Holloway was remembered for a track that did not feature her vocals on most copies.

Fact included "Ride on Time" in its 2014 list of "diva-house belters that still sound incredible", writing: "Some people see this as a guilty pleasure now. Those people are fools. Banging piano + Loleatta Holloway = world-changing greatness." In the same year, the English DJ and producer Duke Dumont rnamed it the fourth-best UK number-one single. Mixmag included it in their 2019 list of the best "diva house tracks", writing that its "overall feel and wailing vocal accompaniment still bangs to this day and it is considered one of the first high-profile examples of italo house". In 2020, The Guardian named "Ride on Time" the 67th-greatest UK number one, writing: "Heather Small blows the house down ... This is a Terminator of a song, unstoppably delivering a payload of pure euphoria as Chicago house is spliced with Italo disco to create perfect pop."

=== Accolades ===
Accolades for "Ride on Time"
Year	Publisher	Country	Accolade	Rank
1993	NME	United Kingdom	"Top Five Euro-Hits of All Time"	3
2005	Bruce Pollock	United States	"The 7,500 Most Important Songs of 1944-2000"	*
2010	Robert Dimery	United States	"1,001 Songs You Must Hear Before You Die"	*
2011	The Guardian	United Kingdom	"A History of Modern Music: Dance"	*
2012	Max	Australia	"1000 Greatest Songs of All Time"	539
2014	Fact	United Kingdom	"21 Diva-House Belters That Still Sound Incredible"	4
2016	Vice	United States	"The Ten Best Samples in the History of House Music"	2
2019	Mixmag	United Kingdom	"The 20 Best Diva House Tracks"	*
2020	The Guardian	United Kingdom	"The 100 Greatest UK No 1s"	67
2020	NME	United Kingdom	"The Best Samples in Music… Ever!"	*
2023	Official UK Chart	United Kingdom	"The Best-Selling Singles of All Time"	129
2024	Classic Pop	United Kingdom	"Top 20 80s House Hits"	2

(*) indicates the list is unordered.

== Charts ==
=== Weekly charts ===
1989–1990 weekly chart performance for "Ride on Time"
Chart (1989–1990)	Peak position
Australia (ARIA)	2
Austria (Ö3 Austria Top 40)	8
Belgium (Ultratop 50 Flanders)	7
Canada Dance/Urban (RPM)	3
Europe (Eurochart Hot 100)	4
Finland (Suomen virallinen lista)	3
France (SNEP)	3
Greece (IFPI)	2
Iceland (Íslenski Listinn Topp 10)	1
Ireland (IRMA)	1
Israel (Israeli Singles Chart)	1
Italy (Musica e dischi)	10
Italy Airplay (Music & Media)	14
Luxembourg (Radio Luxembourg)	2
Netherlands (Dutch Top 40)	22
Netherlands (Single Top 100)	17
New Zealand (Recorded Music NZ)	2
Norway (VG-lista)	5
Spain (AFYVE)	3
Sweden (Sverigetopplistan)	2
Switzerland (Schweizer Hitparade)	5
UK Singles (Official Charts)	1
US 12-inch Singles Sales (Billboard)	44
US Dance Club Play (Billboard)	39
West Germany (GfK)	5

2021 weekly chart performance for "Ride on Time"
Chart (2021)	Peak position
Hungary (Single Top 40)	36

=== Year-end charts ===
1989 year-end chart performance for "Ride on Time"
Chart (1989)	Position
Belgium (Ultratop 50 Flanders)	50
Europe (Eurochart Hot 100)	6
Israel (Israeli Singles Chart)	6
UK Singles (OCC)	1
West Germany (Media Control)	42

1990 year-end chart performance for "Ride on Time"
Chart (1990)	Position
Australia (ARIA)	14
Europe (Eurochart Hot 100)	81
Germany (Media Control)	52
New Zealand (RIANZ)	13
Switzerland (Schweizer Hitparade)	25

== Certifications and sales ==
Certifications for "Ride on Time"
Region	Certification	Certified units/sales
Australia (ARIA)	Platinum	70,000^{^}
France (SNEP)	Silver	200,000^{*}
New Zealand (RMNZ)	Gold	15,000^{‡}
Sweden (GLF)	Gold	25,000^{^}
United Kingdom (BPI)	Platinum	1,092,718
^{*} Sales figures based on certification alone.^{^} Shipments figures based on certification alone.^{‡} Sales+streaming figures based on certification alone.

== See also ==
- List of number-one singles of 1989 (Ireland)
- List of UK Singles Chart number ones of the 1980s
- List of best-selling singles by year in the United Kingdom
