= Martha Wash (album) =

Studio album by Martha Wash
- Released: February 23, 1993
- Recorded: 1992
- Genre: House; R&B; soul
- Length: 63:25
- Label: RCA
- Producer: Alexandra Forbes; The Basement Boys; Brian Alexander Morgan; Eric Beall; Eric Robinson; Steve Skinner; Todd Terry

Martha Wash chronology
Martha Wash (1993)	Something Good (2013)

Singles from Martha Wash
- 1. "Carry On" Released: October 30, 1992; 2. "Give It to You" Released: January 8, 1993; 3. "Runaround" Released: May 10, 1993; 4. "So Whatcha Gonna Do" Released: December 3, 1993

Martha Wash is the debut solo studio album by American singer and songwriter Martha Wash. It was released on February 23, 1993, through RCA Records. Recording sessions for the album took place in 1992 at several studios, after leaving her then-group The Weather Girls. The tracks in the album are a mixture of uptempo songs and ballads, which are basically inspired by R&B and house genres; it also features elements of soul and pop music. The album produced two US Billboard Dance chart number-one singles: "Carry On" and "Give It to You", and a top-ten single "Runaround".

== Reception ==
=== Critical ===
Professional ratings
Review scores
Source	Rating
AllMusic	4/5 stars
Entertainment Weekly	C+
Los Angeles Times	2.5/4 stars
Rolling Stone	3/5 stars

In an AllMusic review, Alex Henderson notes that 'Martha Wash's work with the Weather Girls and Black Box was so strong that one couldn't help but greet this debut solo album with high expectations'. Henderson praised the 'dance-floor gems on the album (including "Things We Do for Love," "Leave a Light On" and the soaring "Carry On")' but wrote that 'most of the tracks fall under the heading of decent but not outstanding.' Describing Wash as a 'big-voiced diva', he noted 'album has more going for it than most of the faceless, soundalike releases flooding the urban contemporary market in 1992, but Wash is capable of so much more.'

In Entertainment Weekly, David Browne also praised Wash's voice, expressing 'Martha Wash's voice is diva incarnate, a big, lusty tornado that's like Patti LaBelle without the bombast' but also expressed disappointment, writing 'stretched out over Martha Wash, an album of generic beats and rhyme-by-numbers material, she's merely Zelma Davis with chops'.

=== Commercial ===
Martha Wash peaked at number 169 on the US Billboard 200, where it spent a total of 2 weeks. More successful on the Top R&B/Hip-Hop Albums chart, it spent a total of 10 weeks and peaked at number forty-two.

== Singles ==
The album spawned two consecutive number one hits on the US Hot Dance Club Songs chart; "Carry On" and "Give it to You", which each spent a total of 13 weeks on the chart. Though "Carry On" failed to appear on the US Hot 100 and its ninety-seven peak on the Hot R&B/Hip-Hop Songs chart remains her lowest, the single experienced warmer reception in Europe where it was a top 10 hit in the Netherlands, peaking at number seven. "Carry On" also reached the top 50 of the UK Singles Chart.

"Give It to You" endured greater success in the US, reaching the top 50 of the R&B/Hip-Hop Songs chart with a number forty-eight peak and spending a total of 12 weeks on the chart. Furthermore, the single rose to number ninety on the Hot 100 and was also Wash' first and only appearance on the Radio Songs chart, where it peaked at seventy-five. "Give it to You" also bettered its predecessor's showing in the UK, where it peaked at thirty-seven.

"Runaround" was the last charting single released from the album. It became Wash's third consecutive top ten hit on the Hot Dance Club Play chart, where it spent a total of 9 weeks and third top 50 appearance on the UK Singles Chart.

== Track listing ==
No.	Title	Writer(s)	Producer(s)	Length
1.	"Someone Who Believes In You" (Prelude)	Gerry Goffin, Carole King	Brian Alexander Morgan	1:44
2.	"So Whatcha Gonna Do"	Todd Terry	Todd Terry	4:55
3.	"Give It To You"	Brian Alexander Morgan	Brian Alexander Morgan	3:49
4.	"Runaround"	Eric Robinson, Todd Terry	Todd Terry	4:41
5.	"Now That You're Gone"	Brian Alexander Morgan	Brian Alexander Morgan	6:15
6.	"Things We Do For Love"	Brian Alexander Morgan	Brian Alexander Morgan	4:25
7.	"Just Us (Dancin')"	Eric Robinson, Victor Orsborn	Todd Terry	2:33
8.	"Leave A Light On"	Alexandra Forbes, Eric Beall, Steve Skinner	Alexandra Forbes, Eric Beall, Steve Skinner and "The Basement Boys"	4:22
9.	"Carry On"	Eric Beall	Eric Beall, Steve Skinner	4:17
10.	"Someone Who Believes In You"	Gerry Goffin, Carole King	Brian Alexander Morgan	3:54
11.	"Hold On (Part I)"	Andy Wright, Eric Robinson	Eric Robinson	3:49
12.	"Hold On (Part II)"	Eric Robinson, Frank Collins	Eric Robinson	4:59
13.	"When It's My Heart"	Clifton David Grigsby, Harvey Hughes	Brian Alexander Morgan	4:06
14.	"Just Us (Singin')"	Eric Robinson, Victor Orsborn	Todd Terry	3:26
Total length:				63:25

== Personnel ==
Credits obtained from the album's liner notes.

Managerial

- Executive producers – Skip Miller
- A&R direction – Kenny Ortiz
- Management – DK Productions, Douglas Kibble

Visuals and Imagery

- Art direction – Ria Lewerke
- Design – Norman Moore
- Photography – Len Prince, NYC
- Stylist – Wanda Hayes

Performance credits

- Martha Wash - lead vocals
- Arif St. Michael (track: 9), Biti Strauchn (tracks: 8, 9), Brian Alexander Morgan (tracks: 1, 3, 5, 6, 10, 13), Carl Hall (track: 12), Carmen Gonzales (track: 6), Charlene Moore (track: 13), Damon Horton (tracks: 1, 10), Douglas Kibble (track: 12), Jeanie Tracy (track: 13), Katreese Barnes (track: 8), Linda Pino (track: 9), Marlon Saunders (tracks: 9), Martha Wash (tracks: 1, 5, 8, 10 to 13), Melonie Daniels (tracks: 11, 12) - backing vocals

Instruments

- Anthony Jackson - bass guitar
- Omar Hakim - drums
- Bernard Grubman (track: 5) - acoustic guitar
- Georg Wadenius (tracks: 1, 10), Greg Skaff (tracks: 7, 11, 14), Ira Siegel (tracks: 9) - guitar
- Barry Eastmond (tracks: 1, 10), Brian Alexander Morgan (tracks: 3, 5, 6, 13), Eric Robinson (tracks: 4, 7, 12, 14), Steve Skinner (tracks: 8, 9), Terry Burrus (tracks: 2, 4, 7, 14), Todd Terry (tracks: 2, 4, 7, 14) - keyboards
- Bashiri Johnson - percussion
- Earl Owensby Jr. (track: 5), Roger Byam (tracks: 1, 10) - saxophone
- Brian Alexander Morgan, Barry Eastmond, Eric Rehl - synthesizer

Technical and production

- Arrangement – Barry Eastmond (strings)
- Vocal Arrangement – Brian Alexander Morgan, Jeanie Tracy, Martha Wash
- Conducting – Barry Eastmond (tracks: 1, 10)
- Engineering – Alec Head (tracks: 1, 10), Arty Skye (tracks: 11, 12), Axel Niehaus (track: 9), Bill Klatt (tracks: 2, 4, 7, 14), Brian Alexander Morgan (track: 5), Jim "Bonzai" Caruso (track: 8), Larry Funk (tracks: 1, 3, 5, 6, 10, 13), Pat Green (track: 3), Pavel De Jesus (tracks: 11, 12), Rusty Cutchin (tracks: 11, 12), Steve Skinner (track: 9)
- Engineering assistants – Axel Niehaus (track: 8), Chris Barnett (tracks: 11, 12), David Carpenter (tracks: 2, 4, 7, 14), Jim Farrell (tracks: 11, 12), Nat Foster (tracks: 1, 3, 5, 6, 10, 13), Neill King (track: 13)
- Mastering – Tom Coyne, Hit Factory
- Mixing – Bill Klatt (tracks: 2, 4, 7, 14), Brian Alexander Morgan (tracks: 1, 3, 4, 5, 10, 13), Jim "Bonzai" Caruso (tracks: 8, 9, 11, 12), Larry Funk (tracks: 1, 3, 4, 5, 10, 13), Ray Bardani (tracks: 1, 10), Tony Maserati (tracks: 5)
- Mixing assistants – Axel Niehaus (tracks: 8, 9), Dante Gioia (track: 3), David Carpenter (tracks: 4, 14), Mark Hensley (tracks: 13), Rich July (tracks: 3, 5, 6)
- Production – Alexandra Forbes (track: 8), The Basement Boys (track: 8), Brian Alexander Morgan (tracks: 1, 3, 5, 6, 10, 13), Eric Beall (tracks: 8, 9), Eric Robinson (tracks: 11, 12), Steve Skinner (tracks: 8, 9), Todd Terry (tracks: 2, 4, 7, 14)
- Programming – Brian Alexander Morgan (tracks: 1, 3, 4, 5, 10, 13), Eric Rehl (track: 1, 10), Arty Skye (tracks: 11, 12), Bradley Carroll (track: 12), Pavel De Jesus (tracks: 11, 12), Pete Smith (track: 12), Rusty Cutchin (tracks: 11, 12)

== Charts ==
Chart (1992)	Peak position
US Billboard 200	169
US Top R&B/Hip-Hop Albums (Billboard)	42
