= Love Sensation =

Single by Loleatta Holloway

from the album Love Sensation
- B-side: "Short End of the Stick"
- Released: 1980
- Genre: Disco
- Length: 3:44 (7" version); 6:33 (12" version); 6:15 (album version)
- Label: Gold Mind
- Songwriter: Dan Hartman
- Producer: Dan Hartman

Loleatta Holloway singles chronology
"That's What You Said" (1979)	"Love Sensation" (1980)	"I've Been Loving You Too Long" (1980)

"Love Sensation" is a 1980 song performed by American R&B singer Loleatta Holloway, taken from her album of the same name (1980), which also was her sixth and final album. The song was written and produced by Dan Hartman, arranged by Norman Harris, and mixed by Tom Moulton. It was a hit on the US Hot Dance Club Play chart, where the song spent a week at No. 1 in September 1980. Vocals from the song have been widely sampled, particularly in electronic dance music, such as in the 1989 Black Box song "Ride on Time".

== Development ==
Originally, Hartman envisioned either Bette Midler or Patti LaBelle as singing "Love Sensation". However, after seeing Holloway perform at a nightclub, he approached her instead to sing the vocals. In various interviews, Holloway recalled that Hartman had her perform the song 29 times over a two-day recording session. She lost her voice as a result, and only recovered by putting Vicks VapoRub in her coffee.

== Samples ==
Since the rise of the remix culture during the 1980s, "Love Sensation" has been heavily sampled with large portions of the song incorporated into other works. The original 1989 release of "Ride on Time" by Black Box sampled Holloway's "Thank you baby, 'cause you're right (sic) on time" lyric before a rerecording as well as instrumental portions by the Salsoul Orchestra, and Hartman received a writing credit.

In 1991, "Good Vibrations" by Marky Mark and the Funky Bunch lifted a sample of Holloway's singing. She received a singing credit on the No. 1 song, giving Holloway her highest U.S. pop chart hit. Holloway even made an appearance performing the chorus in the music video. "Good Vibrations" itself has been frequently sampled with the inclusion of Holloway's contribution.

Parts of "Love Sensation" have been sampled and reused in songs such as:

- "I Wanna Have Some Fun" (1988) by Samantha Fox
- "Ride on Time" (1989) by Black Box
- "I Don't Know Anybody Else" (1989) by Black Box/Martha Wash
- "Grand Piano" (1989) by Mixmaster
- "Just Like a Queen" (1989) by Ellis-D
- "Dance 2 Trance" (1990) by Dance 2 Trance
- "We All Feel Better in the Dark" (1990) by the Pet Shop Boys
- "Take Me Away" (1990) by 2 in a Room
- "Take Me Away" (1991) by Cappella (using the same sample as 2 in a Room)
- "Good Vibrations" (1991) by Marky Mark and the Funky Bunch
- "Move" (1993) by Moby
- "(You Got Me) Burnin' Up" (1998) by Cevin Fisher feat. Loleatta Holloway
- "Yappie Feet" (2000) by Deavid Soul
- "Semisation" (2004) by Technical Itch
- "Love Sensation" (2006) by Eddie Thoneick & Kurd Maverick
- "Take Me Away" (2008) by Chase & Status
- "Burning Up" (2009) by Skream
- "Sweep the Floor" (2009) by Joris Voorn
- "Still Speedin'" (2011) by Sway
- "Blind Faith" (2011) by Chase & Status
- "Bootleg Fireworks (Burning Up)" (2012) by Dillon Francis
- "Soul Train" (2012) by Geck-o
- "Devil in Me" (2012) by Alexandra Burke
- "Thank You" by Third Party feat. Loleatta Holloway
- "Semisation 2013" (2013) by Technical Itch vs. The Panacea
- "Overtime" (2013) by Cash Cash
- "Day and Night" feat. Will Miller & Carter Lang (2014) by A Billion Young
- "Good Vibration" (2015) by Majk Spirit & DJ Mad Skill
- "Good Vibes" (2015) by Kryder & the Wulf
- "Temptation" (2015) by Still Young, Simon de Jano & Madwill
- "Gud Vibrations" (2015) by Nghtmre & SLANDER
- "Natural Power" (2015) by Ruiz Cunha
- "Chocolate Sensation" (2015) by Lenny Fontana
- "So Nice!" (2016) by Diserpier
- "World of Our Love" (2016) by Client Liaison
- "Disco Sensation" (2016) by Funkatron
- "Let Me Tell You" (2017) by ANOTR
- "Ketamine Dreams" (2017) by Partiboi69
- "Sensational" (2017) by Sam Feldt
- "Sweet Sensation" (2018) by Flo-Rida
- "Summer Love" (2018) by Liam Berkeley
- "You Get Down" (2019) by Todd Terry
- "Seat Belt" (2019) by ROBPM
- "You Little Beauty" (2019) by Fisher
- "This Is Oh!" (2019) by Elio Riso and Muter & Muter
- "Camba" (2019) by Fer BR
- "Feeling Good" (2019) by Brokenears

== Remixes ==
In addition to Tom Moulton's 1980 remix for the original 12" single release, the song has been subject to a number of other remixes. These include:

- "Love Sensation (Freemasons Remix)" by Freemasons
- "Love Sensation 2006" by Eddie Thoneick & Kurd Maverick (UK: No. 37)
- "Love Sensation 2006 (7th Heaven's Back to 54 Mix)" by 7th Heaven
- "Love Sensation 2008 (Ride on Time)" by ON-X
- "Love Sensation 2010" by Alexander Cruz
- "Love Sensation (Scorccio Hot Mix)" from Dancemania Presents: Scorccio Super Hit Mix
- "Sensational" by Sam Feldt

The Freemasons and Hi_Tack Burnin' Up mixes were put together on a Dutch CD single, "Love Sensation '06". It reached number 22 on a month-long run on the Dutch Top 40, ranking 176 on the 2006 year-end.

== Impact and legacy ==
In 1994, French DJ Laurent Garnier named "Love Sensation" one of his favourites of all time, saying, "She's a disco screaming diva. This is an uplifting, powerful, unbeatable record. Too many people have used the sample and it's getting boring. You can't compete with the original — it's an all-time classic." In 2019, NME ranked it among "The 20 Best Disco Songs of All Time", writing that it "is Loleatta Holloway at her euphoric best". Same year, American DJ and producer Kevin Saunderson ranked it among "The 10 Best Disco Records of All Time", adding, "Just the perfect vocal. So powerful hearing that voice come through radio and club speakers. Another one I got to experience at the Paradise Garage and it brought so much joy to people, including myself. It's amazing what a track like this could do and how it could make you feel." In 2020, Slant Magazine ranked "Love Sensation" number 14 in their list of "The 100 Best Dance Songs of All Time".

== See also ==
- List of number-one dance hits (United States)
