= Fantasy (Earth, Wind & Fire song) =

1978 single by Earth, Wind & Fire

Single by Earth, Wind & Fire

from the album All 'N All
- B-side: "Be Ever Wonderful"
- Released: January 1978
- Genre: R&B; disco
- Length: 4:38 (album version); 3:46 (7-inch version)
- Label: Columbia
- Songwriters: Maurice White; Verdine White; Eddie del Barrio
- Producer: Maurice White

Earth, Wind & Fire singles chronology
"Serpentine Fire" (1977)	"Fantasy" (1978)	"Jupiter" (1978)

Music video
- "Fantasy" on YouTube

"Fantasy" is a song by American band Earth, Wind & Fire, which was issued as a single in 1978 by Columbia Records.

== Overview ==
"Fantasy" was produced by Maurice White, who also composed the song with Eddie Del Barrio and Verdine White. The song took three months to compose, and was only finally finished after Maurice White saw and was inspired by the film Close Encounters of the Third Kind.

The US B-side of the single was a song called "Runnin''", while the UK B-side was a song called "Be Ever Wonderful". "Fantasy", "Be Ever Wonderful", and "Runnin'" were all included on EWF's 1977 studio album All 'n All.

== Critical reception ==
Blues and Soul declared that "Play it loud and it'll fill any dance floor". Joe McEwen of Rolling Stone wrote "The lyrics of 'Fantasy' (“Come to see, victory, in the land called fantasy”) may be hard to swallow, but the music is as close to elegance as any funk song has come. Voices and a light touch of strings suddenly appear over a choppy, propulsive track, swell and swoop, only to disappear at the snap of a finger and pop up moments later for an exciting, powerful finale. White also utilizes an odd instrumental mix that gives equal emphasis to percussion (except the bass drum, which is usually played down), bass, rhythm guitars and stabbing, staccato horn bursts. The result is light but substantial, and it's become a model for many other bands."

Barry Cain of Record Mirror placed "Fantasy" as one of his four Records of the Week saying "Decontaminated warp factor three faar out felony with a smack of glossy metallic reverence, EW&F transcend the oft restricted peaks of disco into the realms of elaborate, effortless slices of electromania fused into chocolate box acceptance. They sure soar these boys, soaring on the soprano solitude of Maurice White, Mastermind, Mother and Despot." Alex Henderson of AllMusic also called "Fantasy" "dreamy". Record World said that "the horn arrangement and soaring vocals are the chief hook."

"Fantasy" was nominated for a Grammy award in the category of Best R&B Song.

== Appearances in other media ==
Fantasy appeared on the soundtrack of the 1981 feature film Private Lessons, the 1997 feature film The Sixth Man, the 2005 feature film Be Cool and the 2006 video game Grand Theft Auto: Vice City Stories. It also appears in the second season of the Bob's Burgers episode "Bad Tina" (2012) and at the end of the 2020 Disney+ film, Godmothered.

== Chart performance ==
The single reached No. 12 on the Billboard Hot Soul Songs chart, No. 32 on the Billboard Hot 100 chart and No. 14 on the UK Singles Chart.

After its release in Japan as a digital single to cellphones in 2009, it was certified gold for 100,000 downloads in May 2011.

== Charts ==
Chart (1978)	Peak position
Australia (Kent Music Report)	25
Belgium (Ultratop)	13
Canada Top Singles (RPM)	37
France (IFOP)	13
Ireland (IRMA)	4
Netherlands (Dutch Single Top 100)	7
New Zealand (RIANZ)	14
South Africa (Springbok)	7
Sweden (Sverigetopplistan)	8
UK Singles (OCC)	14
US Billboard Hot 100	32
US Hot R&B/Hip-Hop Songs (Billboard)	12

== Certifications ==
Region	Certification	Certified units/sales
United Kingdom (BPI)	Silver	200,000^{‡}
^{‡} Sales+streaming figures based on certification alone.

== Black Box version ==
"Fantasy"

Single by Black Box

from the album Dreamland
- B-side: "Get Down"
- Released: October 22, 1990
- Genre: House
- Length: 5:14
- Label: Groove Groove Melody
- Songwriters: Maurice White; Verdine White; Eddie del Barrio
- Producers: Daniele Davoli; Mirko Limoni; Valerio Semplici

Black Box singles chronology
"Everybody Everybody" (1990)	"Fantasy" (1990)	"The Total Mix" (1991)

Music video
- "Fantasy" on YouTube

In 1990, Italian group Black Box recorded a cover of "Fantasy" for their debut studio album, Dreamland (1990). Their version featured Martha Wash on lead vocals, but their music producers initially failed to credit her. It also contains a sample from the drum pattern of Grace Jones' rendition of "La Vie en rose" (1977). Black Box's version of the song charted at number five in the UK Singles Chart, number 16 in Germany, and number three in Australia. The accompanying music video was directed by Neil Thompson. In 2013, Australian music channel Max included Black Box' version of the song in their list of "1000 Greatest Songs of All Time".

=== Critical reception ===
Upon the single release, Bill Coleman from Billboard magazine named it one of the "highlights" from the album. Another Billboard editor, Larry Flick, described it as a "sleaze-speed house rendition" and an "ethereal remix emphasizing plush strings and Martha Wash's unmistakable voice." Ernest Hardy from Cash Box also named the song a "standout" from the album. On the single review, Henderson and DeVaney said it is "an example of dance music as it should be—moving, inspired, richly expressive. A belter, the big-voiced Martha Wash brings a great deal of emotion, depth and soul to this inspired remake."

The Daily Vault's Michael R. Smith felt that it "sounds like a television theme song that you can't get out of your head." Andrew Smith from Melody Maker called it a "nauseous version". Chris Heath from Smash Hits declared it as a "fairly faithful version" of Earth, Wind & Fire's disco classic. In a retrospective review, Matthew Hocter from Albumism stated that the song is "sung to perfection" by Martha Wash, remarking that it "put the band into a different lane. Doing the original version immense justice".

=== Track listings ===
- CD maxi and 12-inch maxi - Remixed
1. "Fantasy" (club mix) – 7:20
2. "Get Down" Black Box featuring "Stepz" (rap mix) – 6:43
3. "Get Down" Black Box featuring "Stepz" (Rappapella) – 3:00
- 7-inch single
1. "Fantasy" – 3:44
2. "Get Down" Black Box featuring "Stepz" (Rappapella) – 3:00
- 7-inch single - Remixed
1. "Fantasy" (Remixed 7-inch) – 3:44
2. "Get Down" Black Box featuring "Stepz" (rap mix edit) – 3:34
- CD maxi - Remixed
1. "Fantasy" (remixed 7-inch) – 3:44
2. "Get Down" Black Box featuring "Stepz" (rap mix) – 6:43
3. "Fantasy" (club mix) – 7:20
- 12-inch maxi
1. "Fantasy" (Big Band remix) – 5:48
2. "Get Down" Black Box featuring "Stepz" (Party remix) – 3:55
3. "Get Down" Black Box featuring "Stepz" (Afro mix) – 4:15

=== Charts ===
==== Weekly charts ====
Chart (1990–1991)	Peak position
Australia (ARIA)	3
Austria (Ö3 Austria Top 40)	4
Belgium (Ultratop 50 Flanders)	20
Europe (Eurochart Hot 100)	13
Finland (Suomen virallinen lista)	10
France (SNEP)	21
Germany (Official German Charts)	16
Ireland (IRMA)	3
Italy (Musica e dischi)	17
Luxembourg (Radio Luxembourg)	4
Netherlands (Dutch Top 40)	16
Netherlands (Single Top 100)	18
New Zealand (Recorded Music NZ)	28
Switzerland (Schweizer Hitparade)	26
UK Singles (OCC)	5
UK Airplay (Music Week)	5

==== Year-end charts ====
Chart (1990)	Position
UK Singles (OCC)	47
UK Club Chart (Record Mirror)	56

Chart (1991)	Position
Australia (ARIA)	17
Austria (Ö3 Austria Top 40)	21
Belgium (Ultratop)	84
Europe (Eurochart Hot 100)	68
Germany (Media Control)	62
Netherlands (Single Top 100)	99

=== Certifications ===
Region	Certification	Certified units/sales
Australia (ARIA)	Gold	35,000^{^}
United Kingdom (BPI)	Silver	200,000^{^}
^{^} Shipments figures based on certification alone.

=== Release history ===
Region	Date	Format(s)	Label(s)	Ref.
United Kingdom	October 22, 1990	7-inch vinyl; 12-inch vinyl; CD; cassette	Deconstruction; RCA	
Australia	November 19, 1990	7-inch vinyl; 12-inch vinyl; cassette	Deconstruction; RCA	
Australia	December 3, 1990	CD	Deconstruction; RCA	
