= Loleatta Holloway =

American singer (1946–2011)

- Holloway in 1976

Background information
- Born: November 5, 1946; Chicago, Illinois, U.S.
- Died: March 21, 2011 (aged 64) Chicago, Illinois, U.S.
- Genres: Disco; R&B; soul; gospel
- Occupation: Singer-songwriter
- Years active: 1967–2003
- Labels: Aware; Gold Mind; Salsoul; DJ International; The Right Stuff
- Spouse: Floyd Smith (divorced)
- Website: Official MySpace page

Loleatta Holloway (/lɒlˈiːtə/, lo-LEE-tə; November 5, 1946 – March 21, 2011) was an American singer known for disco songs such as "Hit and Run" and "Love Sensation". Billboard ranked her the 95th most successful dance artist of all time. According to The Independent, she is the most sampled female singer in popular music; her vocals appear in house and dance tracks including the 1989 Black Box single "Ride on Time".

== Career ==
=== Early career ===
Holloway began singing gospel with her mother in the Holloway Community Singers in Chicago. From 1967 to 1971, she recorded with Albertina Walker in the Caravans. She was a cast member of the Chicago production of Don't Bother Me, I Can't Cope.

In 1971, she recorded "Rainbow '71", a Curtis Mayfield song first recorded by Gene Chandler in 1963. The single was released on the Apache label and picked up for national distribution by Galaxy Records. Its producer, Floyd Smith, became her manager and later her husband.

=== Aware Records ===
In the early 1970s, Holloway signed with Aware, an Atlanta-based soul music label owned by Michael Thevis. She recorded two albums for the label, both produced by Floyd Smith: Loleatta (1973) and Cry to Me (1975). Her single "Cry to Me," a remake of the Solomon Burke hit, reached number 10 on the Billboard R&B chart and number 68 on the Hot 100, but the label soon went out of business.

=== Gold Mind Records ===
Philadelphia producer Norman Harris signed Holloway in 1976 to his new label, Gold Mind, a subsidiary of Salsoul Records. Her first single from the album Loleatta, "Worn Out Broken Heart," reached number 25 on the R&B chart; its B-side, "Dreaming," climbed to number 72 on the pop chart and launched her as a disco act. In 1978, the ballad "Only You," written and produced by Bunny Sigler, reached number 11 R&B.

She contributed vocals to Dan Hartman's "Relight My Fire"; Hartman then wrote and produced the title track of her fourth and final Gold Mind album, Love Sensation (1980). In the early 1980s, she had another dance hit with "Crash Goes Love," which reached number five on the U.S. Dance chart. She also recorded "So Sweet" for the house-music label DJ International Records.

=== "Ride on Time" ===
The Italian house group Black Box sampled Holloway's "Love Sensation" vocals for their 1989 single "Ride on Time". In the UK, it topped the singles chart for six weeks and became the year's bestselling single. The sample was used without permission. Several sources reported that Holloway reached a settlement and was paid damages, but the producer, Daniele Davoli, said in 2018 that only Salsoul Records, the owner of the master recording, received payment.

Holloway resented the use of her vocals: "I've been around for years trying to get this one hit record. It annoyed me knowing that Black Box were number one and I was not getting any credit for it." She also said Black Box was paid more for performances than her, even after she was billed as "the voice of Black Box". Davoli said he regretted not meeting Holloway before her death and would have liked to apologize "for how messy things got".

=== Later career ===
Holloway had her first US number one hit when Marky Mark and the Funky Bunch featured her vocals on "Good Vibrations" (1991). She performed with the group to promote the single and received full vocal credit and a share of the royalties. This followed a backlash against acts like Milli Vanilli and producers who had used Martha Wash's vocals without credit.

In 1992, she was billed alongside Cappella on the single "Take Me Away" (UK number 25). Later dance chart entries included "Share My Joy" and "What Goes Around Comes Around" (both credited to "GTS featuring Loleatta Holloway") in 2000, and "Relight My Fire" (credited to Martin featuring Holloway), which reached number five in 2003. "Love Sensation '06" reached number 37 on the UK Singles Chart.

== Personal life ==
Holloway met Floyd Smith, who would become her producer, manager, and husband, around 1971. The two later divorced. She had four children. Holloway died on March 21, 2011, in Chicago, from heart failure, at the age of 64.

== Discography ==
=== Studio albums ===
Year	Album	Peak chart positions		Record label
Year	Album	US	US R&B	Record label
1973	Loleatta	—	—	Aware
1975	Cry to Me	—	47	Aware
1977	Loleatta	—	—	Gold Mind
1978	Queen of the Night	187	47	Gold Mind
1979	Loleatta Holloway	—	—	Gold Mind
1980	Love Sensation	—	—	Gold Mind
"—" denotes a releases that did not chart.

=== Compilation albums ===
- Greatest Hits (1996, The Right Stuff)
- Queen of the Night: The Ultimate Club Collection (2001, Salsoul)
- The Greatest Performance of My Life: The Best of Loleatta Holloway (2003, Salsoul)
- The Anthology (2005, Suss'd)
- A Tribute to Loleatta Holloway: The Salsoul Years (2013, Salsoul)
- Dreamin': The Loleatta Holloway Anthology 1976–1982 (2014, Big Break)

=== Singles ===
Year	Single	Peak chart positions					Album
Year	Single	US	US R&B	US Dan	AUS	UK	Album
1971	"Rainbow "71""	—	—	—	—	—	—N/a
1973	"Part Time Lover, Full Time Fool"	—	—	—	—	—	Loleatta (1973)
1973	"Mother of Shame"	—	63	—	—	—	Loleatta (1973)
1973	"Our Love"	—	43	—	—	—	Loleatta (1973)
1974	"H•e•l•p M•e M•y L•o•r•d"	—	—	—	—	—	Cry to Me
1975	"Cry to Me"	68	10	—	—	—	Cry to Me
1975	"I Know Where You're Coming From"	—	69	—	—	—	Cry to Me
1975	"Casanova"	—	—	—	—	—	Cry to Me
1976	"Worn Out Broken Heart"	—	25	—	—	—	Loleatta (1977)
1977	"Dreamin'"	72	—	3	—	—	Loleatta (1977)
1977	"Hit and Run"	—	56	3	—	—	Loleatta (1977)
1977	"Ripped Off"	—	—	3	—	—	Loleatta (1977)
1977	"We're Getting Stronger (The Longer We Stay Together)"	—	—	—	—	—	Loleatta (1977)
1978	"Only You" (with Bunny Sigler)	87	11	9	—	—	Queen of the Night
1978	"I May Not Be There When You Want Me (But I'm Right on Time)"	—	—	9	—	—	Queen of the Night
1978	"Catch Me On the Rebound"	—	92	9	—	—	Queen of the Night
1979	"That's What You Said"	—	—	30	—	—	Loleatta Holloway
1980	"Love Sensation"	—	—	1	—	—	Love Sensation
1980	"I've Been Loving You Too Long"	—	—	—	—	—	Love Sensation
1983	"Love Sensation" (re-release)	—	—	45	—	—	
1984	"Crash Goes Love"	—	86	5	—	—	
1992	"Strong Enough"	—	—	35	—	—	
1993	"Love Sensation" (remix)	—	—	32	—	—	
1994	"Stand Up!"	—	—	—	—	68	
1994	"The Queen's Anthem"	—	—	—	—	77	
1995	"I Survived"	—	—	—	—	178	
2000	"Chocolate Sensation" / "Ride on Time" (remix)	—	—	9	—	—	
2000	"Dreamin'" (remix)	—	—	1	—	59	
2005	"Stand Up" (remix)	—	—	44	—	—	
2006	"Love Sensation '06"	—	—	—	49	37	
"—" denotes a recording that did not chart or was not released in that territory.

==== As featured performer ====
Year	Title	Artist	Peak chart positions					Album
Year	Title	Artist	US	US R&B	US Dan	AUS	UK	Album
1977	"Run Away"	Salsoul Orchestra	—	84	3	—	—	Magic Journey
1982	"Seconds"	Salsoul Orchestra	—	—	22	—	—	Heat It Up
1991	"Good Vibrations"	Marky Mark and the Funky Bunch	1	64	10	4	14	Music for the People
1991	"Take Me Away"	Cappella	—	—	—	—	25	—N/a
1994	"Keep the Fire Burnin'"	Dan Hartman	—	—	—	—	49	Keep the Fire Burnin'
1998	"Shout to the Top"	Fire Island	—	—	1	—	23	—N/a
1999	"(You Got Me) Burnin' Up"	Cevin Fisher	—	—	1	—	14	—N/a
1999	"No Apology"	Love to Infinity	—	—	—	—	140	—N/a
2000	"Share My Joy"	GTS	—	—	5	—	—	Re-Birth 2
2001	"What Goes Around Comes Around"	GTS	—	—	3	—	—	01
2003	"Relight My Fire"	Ricky Martin	—	—	5	—	—	—N/a
2003	"A Better World"	AgeHa w/ Jocelyn Brown	—	—	3	—	—	Mix the Vibe: Past–Present–Future
"—" denotes a recording that did not chart or was not released in that territory.

(""Cry to Me" reached #81 in Canada.)

=== Video games ===
- Make My Video: Marky Mark and the Funky Bunch (1992) – Herself (archive footage)

=== TV series ===
- Re-Micks (2011) – Herself (archive footage)

== See also ==
- List of number-one hits (United States)
- List of artists who reached number one on the Hot 100 (U.S.)
- List of number-one dance hits (United States)
- List of artists who reached number one on the U.S. Dance chart
- Club Zanzibar (black electronic music venue in 1980s-era Newark, New Jersey)
