= Black Box (band) =

Italian house music group

Background information
- Origin: Italy
- Genres: Italo house; house; Eurodance
- Years active: 1988–present
- Labels: RCA; Out; Groove Groove Melody; Mercury Records; Manifesto Records (UK)
- Members: Celestine Walcott-Gordon; Daniele Davoli; Valerio Semplici; Mirko Limoni
- Past members: Katrin Quinol; Charvoni Woodson
- Website: blackboxhouse.eu

Black Box is an Italian house music group popular in the late 1980s and early 1990s. It consists of DJ Daniele Davoli, classically trained clarinet teacher Valerio Semplici, keyboardist and electronic musician Mirko Limoni, and vocalist Celestine Walcott-Gordon. French fashion model Katrin Quinol joined the act in 1989 and became the official face of Black Box, appearing on the cover of their single and album releases as well as in music videos, including the hit "Ride on Time", which was the highest-selling single of 1989 in the UK. The following year, it was revealed that Quinol was lip-syncing and had not performed on the recording. American singer Martha Wash performed the majority of the songs on the group's debut album, Dreamland, while being uncredited.

== History ==
=== 1988–1989: Early beginnings ===
Daniele Davoli, Valerio Semplici, and Mirko Limoni formed a production team called Starlight (often credited as Starlight Invention Group). The group's first single was a dance single called "Numero Uno", released in 1988. The song was often credited by their other alias, Groove Groove Melody. "Numero Uno" peaked at number nine on the UK Singles chart. In early 1989, they produced a single called "Vocalizado" for Italian singer Robby Magno. In mid-1989, the group released the maxi-single "Airport 89" under the name Wood Allen. The single peaked at number 99 on the UK Singles chart.

=== 1989–1992: Dreamland ===
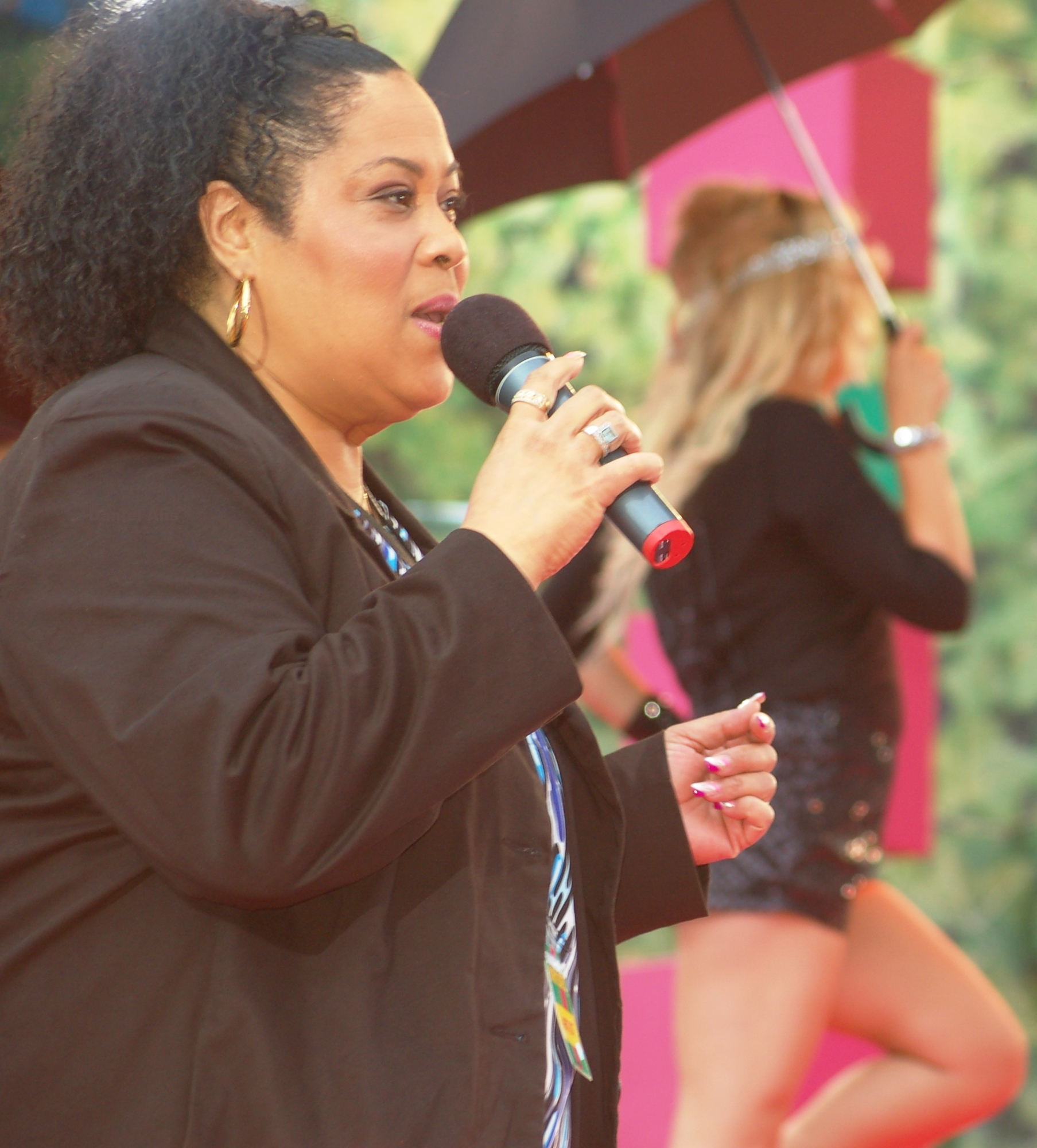
Martha Wash (pictured), uncredited female singer of "Everybody Everybody" and five additional songs.

In 1989, the group changed their name to Black Box and began working on their first album. They added French Caribbean model Katrin Quinol to the lineup as the group's frontwoman. Quinol's contribution was to lip sync songs in music videos and during televised performances. In July 1989, Black Box released their single "Ride on Time". The song became an international hit, reaching number one in three countries, including the UK, where it became the UK's best-selling single of 1989, selling over 1.5 million copies worldwide. In November 1989, they released the single "Grand Piano" under the alias Mixmaster. The song peaked at number nine on the UK Singles chart. In December 1989, they released the follow-up single "I Don't Know Anybody Else". The song became an international top-ten hit and gave the group their first number-one song on Billboard's Dance chart. In March 1990, they released their fourth single, "Everybody Everybody". Like its predecessors, the song also became an international hit and earned the group their second number one on the Dance chart.

In May 1990, they released their debut album Dreamland. Despite its moderate performance on the charts, the album became certified gold in the United Kingdom and United States and peaked at number one in the Australian chart. In late 1990, the album's fourth single, "Fantasy", a cover of the 1978 hit by Earth, Wind & Fire, peaked at number five on the UK Singles chart and became certified silver in the United Kingdom.

In February 1991, "Strike It Up" was released as the album's fifth single. The song became another international top-ten hit for the group and earned them their third number-one single on the Dance chart. The album's final singles "Open Your Eyes" and "Hold On" performed moderately well on the charts. In the same year, Black Box released a re-issue of "Ride on Time" called "Bright on Time". Quinol, who did not contribute vocally or musically to the group's music, left Black Box in late 1991 after the band became the subject of a media backlash involving lip-syncing scandals and lawsuits.

=== 1993–1999: Positive Vibration and lineup changes ===
In 1993, Black Box added American singer Charvoni Woodson to the lineup. They released the single "Rockin' to the Music", which performed poorly on the charts. In 1995, Black Box released their second album, Positive Vibration, which failed to chart or rise to the same level of success as their previous record. The album spawned the singles "Not Anyone" and "A Positive Vibration", both of which fared well on the charts. In 1997, the album was re-issued with three additional singles: "I Got the Vibration", "Native New Yorker", and "Fall into My Love".

In April 1998, Black Box released a compilation album, Strike It Up: The Best of Black Box. In June 1998, they released another compilation, Hits & Mixes. In 1999, a maxi single of remixes for "Bright on Time" was exclusively released in France.

=== 2003–present ===
Woodson continued touring and performing as the lead vocalist of the group periodically until 2015. That year, Celestine Walcott-Gordon began performing live as the new lead vocalist. In 2018, the group released the single "Everyone Will Follow", featuring vocals by Walcott-Gordon.

== Lip-syncing scandals and lawsuits ==
In 1990, American singer Loleatta Holloway and American producer Dan Hartman sued Black Box for copyright infringement and unauthorized sampling. "Ride on Time" sampled Holloway's 1980 song "Love Sensation", which was written and produced by Hartman. Neither Holloway nor Hartman were consulted for permission to sample the song, and Black Box failed to credit Holloway's vocals in the song. Additionally, Black Box had used Quinol to lip-sync Holloway's vocals in the music video for "Ride on Time", which led the public to believe Quinol was the actual singer. Holloway and Hartman eventually received an undisclosed out-of-court settlement. As a result, Black Box re-issued "Ride on Time", removing Holloway's vocals and featuring newly recorded vocals by English singer Heather Small. The group still retained the original version on their re-issued album Dreamland and added Holloway's name as the featured vocalist on "Ride on Time" as well as giving Hartman songwriting credits. Black Box would later issue another new version of the song called "Bright on Time" in 1991.

In September 1990, American singer Martha Wash sued Black Box and RCA Records for commercial appropriation after she became aware of the lip-sync scandal perpetrated by the group. During the recording session of their album Dreamland in 1989, Wash was recruited as a session singer to simply demo songs produced by Black Box. Unbeknownst to her, Black Box retained Wash's vocals on a total of six songs, including "Everybody Everybody", "Open Your Eyes", "Hold On", "I Don't Know Anybody Else", "Strike It Up", and "Fantasy" on the album Dreamland. Despite Wash's contributions to the songs, Black Box never credited her for her vocals and instead used Quinol to lip-sync Wash's vocals during music videos, televised performances, and concert performances. RCA settled the case out of court in December 1990, agreeing to pay Wash a "substantial" fee. The company also signed her to an eight-album recording contract and financed her national tour. Wash's lawsuit also resulted in federal legislation in the United States, making vocal credit mandatory for all albums and music videos.

== Discography ==
=== Studio albums ===
Title	Album details	Peak chart positions										Certifications
Title	Album details	AUS	CAN	FRA	GER	NZ	NOR	SWE	SWI	UK	US	Certifications
Dreamland	Released: 8 May 1990; Label: RCA; Formats: CD, LP, cassette	1	18	35	36	4	8	15	9	14	56	ARIA: Platinum; BPI: Gold; IFPI SWI: Gold; MC: 2× Platinum; RIAA: Gold
Positive Vibration	Released: 23 August 1995; Label: Clubstitute; Formats: CD	—	—	—	—	—	—	—	—	—	—	
"—" denotes releases that did not chart

=== Compilation albums ===
Title	Album details
Strike It Up: The Best of Black Box	Released: 14 April 1998; Label: BMG; Formats: CD, cassette
Hits & Mixes	Released: 30 June 1998; Label: BMG; Formats: CD

=== Remix albums ===
Title	Album details	Peak chart positions
Title	Album details	NLD
Remixland	Released: 1990; Label: Polydor; Formats: CD, LP, cassette	58
Mixed Up!	Released: 12 November 1991; Label: RCA; Formats: CD, LP, cassette	—
Dreamlanders	Released: 7 May 2021; Label: Groove Groove Melody; Formats: Digital download	—
"—" denotes releases that did not chart

=== Singles ===
Title	Year	Peak chart positions										Certifications	Album
Title	Year	ITA	AUS	BEL (FLA)	FRA	GER	NZ	SWE	UK	US	US Dance	Certifications	Album
"Numero Uno" (Note: Released under the alias Starlight.)	1988	—	23	—	—	—	—	—	9	—	—		Non-album single
"Airport 89" (Note: Released under the alias Wood Allen.)	1989	—	—	—	—	—	—	—	99	—	—		Non-album single
"Megamix" (featuring Lelewel)	1989	—	—	—	15	—	—	—	—	—	—		Non-album single
"Ride on Time" (featuring Loleatta Holloway)	1989	10	2	7	3	5	2	2	1	—	39	ARIA: Platinum; BPI: Gold; IFPI SWE: Gold; SNEP: Silver	Dreamland
"Grand Piano" (Note: Released under the alias Mixmaster.)	1989	—	—	—	—	12	—	—	9	—	—		Non-album single
"I Don't Know Anybody Else" (featuring Martha Wash)	1989	12	6	—	9	12	25	8	4	23	1	ARIA: Gold	Dreamland
"Everybody Everybody" (featuring Martha Wash)	1990	7	35	39	11	41	—	—	16	8	1		Dreamland
"Fantasy" (featuring Martha Wash)	1990	17	3	—	21	16	—	—	5	—	—	ARIA: Gold; BPI: Silver	Dreamland
"The Total Mix"	1990	—	24	—	—	—	39	—	12	—	—		Remixland
"Megamix"	1991	—	—	—	34	33	—	—	—	—	—		Remixland
"Bright on Time"	1991	—	—	48	—	—	—	—	—	—	—		Remixland
"Strike It Up" (featuring Martha Wash)	1991	—	20	13	26	26	29	—	16	8	1		Dreamland
"Open Your Eyes" (featuring Martha Wash)	1991	12	60	—	45	44	—	32	48	—	—		Dreamland
"Hold On" (featuring Martha Wash)	1992	—	—	—	—	—	—	—	—	—	—		Dreamland
"Rockin' to the Music"	1993	—	103	—	—	—	—	14	39	—	—		Positive Vibration
"Not Anyone"	1995	—	151	—	—	—	—	—	31	—	—		Positive Vibration
"A Positive Vibration"	1995	13	—	—	—	—	—	—	—	—	—		Positive Vibration
"I Got the Vibration"	1996	—	—	—	—	—	—	—	21	—	—		Positive Vibration
"Native New Yorker"	1997	—	—	—	—	—	—	—	46	—	—		Positive Vibration
"Fall Into My Love"	1997	—	—	—	—	—	—	—	—	—	—		Positive Vibration
"The Beat of Your Heart"	1997	—	—	—	—	—	—	—	—	—	—		
"Bright on Time ('99 Mix)"	1999	—	—	—	77	—	—	—	—	—	—		Non-album single
"Ride on Time (2003 Mix)"	2003	—	—	—	—	—	—	—	—	—	—		Non-album single
"Everybody Everybody 2007"	2007	—	—	—	—	—	—	—	—	—	—		Non-album single
"Ride on Time (20th Anniversary Mix)"	2009	—	—	—	—	—	—	—	—	—	—		Non-album single
"Everyone Will Follow"	2018	—	—	—	—	—	—	—	—	—	—		Superbest
"—" denotes the single failed to chart or was not released

== See also ==
- List of artists who reached number one on the U.S. Dance chart
