= Floyd Smith (musician) =

American jazz guitarist (1917–1982)

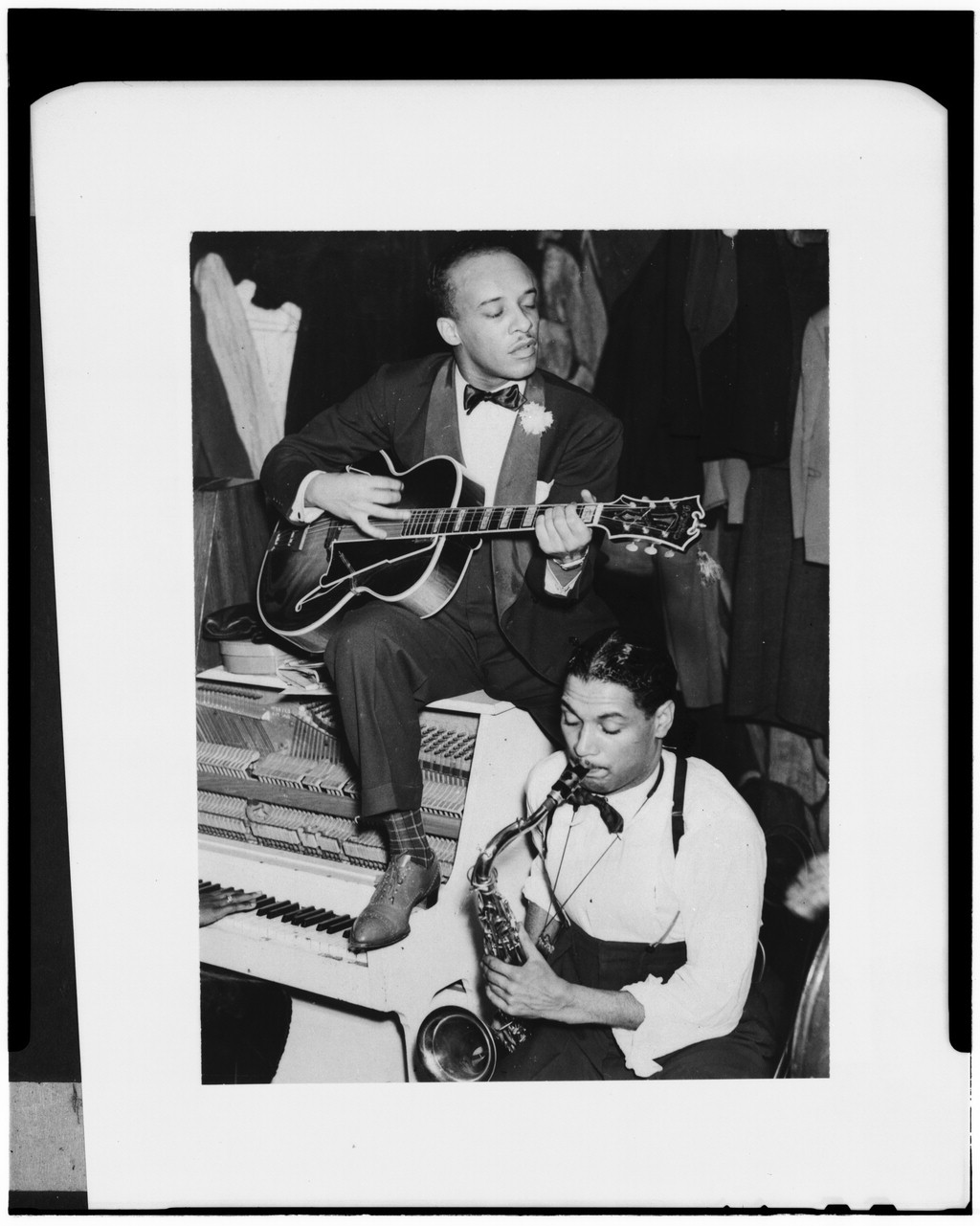
- Smith (top) with Dick Wilson at the Howard Theatre, Washington, D.C., c. 1941

Background information
- Also known as: Floyd "Guitar" Smith
- Born: Floyd George Smith; January 25, 1917; St. Louis, Missouri, U.S.
- Died: March 29, 1982 (aged 65) Indianapolis, Indiana, U.S.
- Genres: Jazz; R&B
- Occupations: Musician; record producer
- Instrument: Guitar
- Years active: 1930s–1970s

Floyd George Smith (January 25, 1917 – March 29, 1982), sometimes credited as Floyd "Guitar" Smith, was an American jazz guitarist and record producer.

== Biography ==
Born in St. Louis, Missouri, Smith studied music theory as a teenager and learned the ukulele as a child before taking up guitar. He spent his early career in territory bands, playing in groups such as Eddie Johnson's Crackerjacks, the Jeter–Pillars Orchestra, the Sunset Royal Orchestra, the Brown Skin Models, and Andy Kirk's 12 Clouds of Joy. His composition "Floyd's Guitar Blues", recorded with Andy Kirk's orchestra in March 1939, has been claimed as the first hit record to feature a blues solo on electric guitar.

Smith enlisted during World War II and was stationed in Britain as a sergeant. He also met and played with Django Reinhardt in Paris. Following the war, he rejoined Andy Kirk's band before forming his own small ensembles. He played with Wild Bill Davis in the 1950s, Bill Doggett in the early 1960s, and also recorded occasionally with drummer Chris Columbo's bands during the late 1950s and early 1960s. He later settled in Indianapolis and formed his own jazz trio.

In the 1970s, Smith moved into writing songs and record production, working with Dakar/Brunswick Records in Chicago, for which he recorded a few singles. He produced two albums with R&B star Loleatta Holloway for Aware Records of Atlanta, as well as two (one completed, but unissued when the label folded) with John Edwards, who later became lead singer of the Detroit Spinners. He produced two Top 10 R&B hits on Aware with Edwards ("Careful Man", No. 8 in 1974) and Holloway ("Cry To Me", No. 10 in 1975). In the late 1970s, he produced tracks on several albums with Loleatta Holloway for Gold Mine / Salsoul Records. He managed the former gospel singer and later married her.

He died in Indianapolis, Indiana, in March 1982 at the age of 65. He was buried in the New Crown Cemetery.

== Discography ==
=== As leader ===
- "Floyd's Guitar Blues" // "I'm Weak For You" (Hy-Tone 29, 1947) – with Jo Jo Adams
- "Around The Watch, Part 1" // "Around The Watch, Part 2" (Hy-Tone 30, 1947) – with Jo Jo Adams
- "I Get The Blues Every Morning" // "Voodit" (Hy-Tone 31, 1947) – with Jo Jo Adams
- "Blue Moods" // "Saturday Nite Boogie" (Aristocrat 409, 1950; reissue: Chess 1439)
- "Gloomy Evening" // "Floydynasty" (Decca 48257, 1951) – with Horace Henderson
- "After Hours" // "Me And You" (Decca 28208, 1952) – with Horace Henderson
- "Don't Cry Baby" // "You May Be Trash To Someone (But Baby You're A Queen To Me)" (Decca 28801, 1953) – note: B-side by the Billy Valentine Trio (with Mickey Baker on guitar).
- "Grandpa's Gully Rock" // "This Is A Miracle" (Fortune 540, 1961) – with The Montclairs
- "Getting Nowhere Fast" // "Soul Strut" (Dakar 604, 1968)
- Floyd's Guitar Blues (Disques Black & Blue 33.046, 1972) – with Wild Bill Davis and Chris Columbo; reissued on CD as Relaxin' With Floyd (The Definitive Black & Blue Sessions) in 1996 by Black & Blue (BB-875).
- "The Bump" // "I Want 'Cha To Let Me Come Home" (Aware/GRC 042, 1974)
- "I Just Can't Give You Up" // "I Just Can't Give You Up (Instrumental Version)" (Salsoul 2001, 1975)

=== As sideman ===
With Jo Jo Adams (featured vocalist with Floyd Smith's Combo)

- The Chronological Jo Jo Adams 1946–1953 (Classics 'Blues & Rhythm Series' #5083, 2004) – includes Smith's December 1946 six-side Hy-Tone session featuring the classic re-recording of "Floyd's Guitar Blues".

With Mildred Bailey and Her Oxford Greys

- The Chronological Mildred Bailey 1939 (Classics #1187, 2002) – includes Bailey's March 1939 six-side Vocalion session with Mary Lou Williams, Floyd Smith, John Williams, Eddie Dougherty.

With Krazy Kris / Chris Columbo and The Swinging Gentlemen

- "Floyd's Guitar Blues" // "Wishy Washy" (King 4991, 1956)
- "Oh Yeah!, Pt. 1" // "Oh Yeah!, Pt. 2" (King 5012, 1957) – with Johnny Hammond Smith

With Wild Bill Davis Trio

- Here's Wild Bill Davis (Epic LG-1004 [10" LP], 1954)
- On The Loose (Epic LN-1121 [10" LP], 1954)
- Wild Bill Davis At Birdland (Epic LN-3118, 1955) – reissued as Lullaby Of Birdland in 1972.
- Evening Concerto (Epic LN-3308, 1955)
- Wild Bill Davis On Broadway (Imperial LP-9010, 1956)
- Wild Bill Davis In Hollywood (Imperial LP-9015, 1956)
- Impulsions (Disques Black & Blue 33.037, 1972) – reissued on CD in 1987 by Black & Blue (233.037).
- Midnight Slows Vol. 2 (Disques Black & Blue 33.045, 1972)

With Bill Doggett and His Combo

- Oops! The Swinging Sounds Of Bill Doggett (Columbia CL-1814/CS-8614, 1962)

With Dizzy Gillespie and His Orchestra

- The Chronological Dizzy Gillespie And His Orchestra 1949–1950 (Classics #1168, 2002) – includes the 18-piece Gillespie orchestra's January 1950 four-side Capitol session.

With Al Grey

- Al Grey & Wild Bill Davis (Disques Black & Blue 33.041, 1972) – with Eddie "Cleanhead" Vinson

With Earl Hines Swingtette

- The Chronological Earl Hines And His Orchestra 1947–1949 (Classics #1120, 2000) – includes Hines' December 1948 four-side MGM session with Floyd Smith, Arvell Shaw, Sid Catlett.

With Andy Kirk and His Clouds Of Joy

- The Chronological Andy Kirk And His 12 Clouds Of Joy 1939–1940 (Classics #640, 1992) – includes the Kirk orchestra's original Decca recording of "Floyd's Guitar Blues".
- The Chronological Andy Kirk And His Clouds Of Joy 1940–1942 (Classics #681, 1993)
- The Chronological Andy Kirk And His Orchestra 1943–1949 (Classics #1075, 2000)

With Johnny "Hammond" Smith

- The Stinger (Prestige PR-7408, 1965) – reissued on CD as Good 'Nuff in 2003 by Prestige (24282).

With Buddy Tate

- Buddy Tate & Wild Bill Davis (Disques Black & Blue 33.054, 1972) – reissued on CD as Broadway in 1987 by Black & Blue (233.054).

With Noble "Thin Man" Watts Quintet

- Honkin', Shakin' & Slidin' (A Singles Collection 1954–1962) (Jasmine #3115, 2019) – includes Watts' first session ("Mashing Potatoes" // "Pig Ears And Rice" on DeLuxe 6066, 1954) as a leader with backing by the Wild Bill Davis Trio (Davis/Floyd Smith/Chris Columbo).

With Mary Lou Williams (featured pianist with Six Men & A Girl)

- The Chronological Mary Lou Williams 1927–1940 (Classics #630, 1992) – includes Williams' January 1940 four-side Varsity session with Earl Thompson, Buddy Miller, Dick Wilson, Floyd Smith, Booker Collins, Ben Thigpen.
