= List of number-one singles of 1971 (Canada) =

This is a list of the weekly Canadian RPM magazine (Note: The magazine's weekly record charts were digitized by the AV Trust. The collection is archived by Library and Archives Canada here. The PDF text search does not work unless you have additional software installed. You must view each entry on the chart for a match.) number one Top Singles chart of 1971. (Note: A collection of all the .pdf files cited is available here.) (Note: On 21 March 1966, the chart became the RPM 100, as expanded to the top 100 singles.)

Volume:Issue	Issue Date(s)	Song	Artist
14:20	2 January	"Isn't It a Pity"	George Harrison
14:21	9 January	"Isn't It a Pity"	George Harrison
14:22	16 January	"Isn't It a Pity"	George Harrison
14:23	23 January	"Knock Three Times"	Dawn with Tony Orlando
14:24	30 January	"Knock Three Times"	Dawn with Tony Orlando
14:25	6 February	"Lonely Days"	Bee Gees
14:26	13 February	"(I Never Promised You a) Rose Garden"	Lynn Anderson
15:1	20 February	"If You Could Read My Mind"	Gordon Lightfoot
15:2	27 February	"One Bad Apple"	The Osmonds
15:3	6 March	"One Bad Apple"	The Osmonds
15:4	13 March	"Have You Ever Seen the Rain?"	Creedence Clearwater Revival
15:5	20 March	"Have You Ever Seen the Rain?"	Creedence Clearwater Revival
15:6	27 March	"Doesn't Somebody Want to Be Wanted"	The Partridge Family
15:7	3 April	"She's a Lady"	Tom Jones
15:8	10 April	"Stay Awhile"	The Bells
15:9	17 April	"Stay Awhile"	The Bells
15:10	24 April	"Joy to the World"	Three Dog Night
15:11	1 May	"Joy to the World"	Three Dog Night
15:12	8 May	"Joy to the World"	Three Dog Night
15:13	15 May	"Joy to the World"	Three Dog Night
15:14	22 May	"Joy to the World"	Three Dog Night
15:15	29 May	"Joy to the World"	Three Dog Night
15:16	5 June	"Brown Sugar"	The Rolling Stones
15:17	12 June	"Brown Sugar"	The Rolling Stones
15:18	19 June	"Brown Sugar"	The Rolling Stones
15:19	26 June	"It Don't Come Easy"	Ringo Starr
15:20	3 July	"It Don't Come Easy"	Ringo Starr
15:21	10 July	"It's Too Late"	Carole King
15:22	17 July	"It's Too Late"	Carole King
15:23	24 July	"It's Too Late"	Carole King
15:24	31 July	"Don't Pull Your Love"	Hamilton, Joe Frank & Reynolds
15:25	7 August	"Sweet City Woman"	The Stampeders
15:26	14 August	"Sweet City Woman"	The Stampeders
16:1	21 August	"Sweet City Woman"	The Stampeders
16:2	28 August	"How Can You Mend a Broken Heart?"	Bee Gees
16:3	4 September	"How Can You Mend a Broken Heart?"	Bee Gees
16:4	11 September	"Sweet Hitch-Hiker"	Creedence Clearwater Revival
16:5	18 September	"Uncle Albert/Admiral Halsey"	Paul and Linda McCartney
16:6	25 September	"Uncle Albert/Admiral Halsey"	Paul and Linda McCartney
16:7	2 October	"Uncle Albert/Admiral Halsey"	Paul and Linda McCartney
16:8	9 October	"Maggie May"	Rod Stewart
16:9	16 October	"Go Away Little Girl"	Donny Osmond
16:10	23 October	"Go Away Little Girl"	Donny Osmond
16:11	30 October	"Yo-Yo"	The Osmonds
16:12	6 November	"Gypsys, Tramps & Thieves"	Cher
16:13	13 November	"Gypsys, Tramps & Thieves"	Cher
16:14	20 November	"Gypsys, Tramps & Thieves"	Cher
16:15	27 November	"Imagine"	John Lennon
16:16	4 December	"Imagine"	John Lennon
16:17	11 December	"Theme from Shaft"	Isaac Hayes
16:18	18 December (Note: RPM did not publish on 1 January 1972, or indicate an issue number covering this date, therefore charting for that week is implied. January 15th was "No. 21 & 2".)	"Family Affair"	Sly & the Family Stone
16:19	25 December	"Family Affair"	Sly & the Family Stone

== See also ==
- 1971 in music
- List of Billboard Hot 100 number ones of 1971
- List of Cashbox Top 100 number-one singles of 1971
