= Billboard Year-End Hot Soul Singles of 1974 =

American music chart

This is a list of Billboard magazine's Top Hot Soul Singles of 1974.

No.	Title	Artist(s)
1	"Feel Like Makin' Love"	Roberta Flack
2	"Boogie Down"	Eddie Kendricks
3	"Jungle Boogie"	Kool & the Gang
4	"Best Thing That Ever Happened to Me"	Gladys Knight & the Pips
5	"Lookin' for a Love"	Bobby Womack
6	"Rock Your Baby"	George McCrae
7	"The Payback"	James Brown
8	"Mighty Love"	The Spinners
9	"Dancing Machine"	The Jackson 5
10	"Sexy Mama"	The Moments
11	"Put Your Hands Together"	The O'Jays
12	"Rock the Boat"	The Hues Corporation
13	"TSOP (The Sound of Philadelphia)"	MFSB featuring The Three Degrees
14	"I'm in Love"	Aretha Franklin
15	"Can't Get Enough of Your Love, Babe"	Barry White
16	"Trying to Hold on to My Woman"	Lamont Dozier
17	"Outside Woman"	Bloodstone
18	"Be Thankful for What You Got"	William DeVaughn
19	"Tell Me Something Good"	Rufus featuring Chaka Khan
20	"Livin' for You"	Al Green
21	"Let Your Hair Down"	The Temptations
22	"I Like to Live the Love"	B. B. King
23	"Until You Come Back to Me (That's What I'm Gonna Do)"	Aretha Franklin
24	"If You're Ready (Come Go with Me)"	The Staple Singers
25	"Hang On in There Baby"	Johnny Bristol
26	"I'll Be the Other Woman"	The Soul Children
27	"Living for the City"	Stevie Wonder
28	"Let's Get Married"	Al Green
29	"Touch a Hand, Make a Friend"	The Staple Singers
30	"I've Got to Use My Imagination"	Gladys Knight & the Pips
31	"Hollywood Swinging"	Kool & the Gang
32	"Mighty Mighty"	Earth, Wind & Fire
33	"Just Don't Want to Be Lonely"	The Main Ingredient
34	"You Haven't Done Nothin'"	Stevie Wonder
35	"We're Getting Careless with Our Love"	Johnnie Taylor
36	"Sideshow"	Blue Magic
37	"On and On"	Gladys Knight & the Pips
38	"Homely Girl"	The Chi-Lites
39	"Can This Be Real"	The Natural Four
40	"You Make Me Feel Brand New"	The Stylistics
41	"Kung Fu"	Curtis Mayfield
42	"It's Been a Long Time"	New Birth
43	"Honey Please, Can't Ya See"	Barry White
44	"Don't You Worry 'bout a Thing"	Stevie Wonder
45	"Stoned to the Bone"	James Brown
46	"Do It Baby"	The Miracles
47	"Thanks for Saving My Life"	Billy Paul
48	"Love's Theme"	The Love Unlimited Orchestra
49	"Joy"	Isaac Hayes
50	"Baby Come Close"	Smokey Robinson

== See also ==
- 1974 in music
- Billboard Year-End Hot 100 singles of 1974
- List of Hot Soul Singles number ones of 1974
