= List of Hot Soul Singles number ones of 1974 =

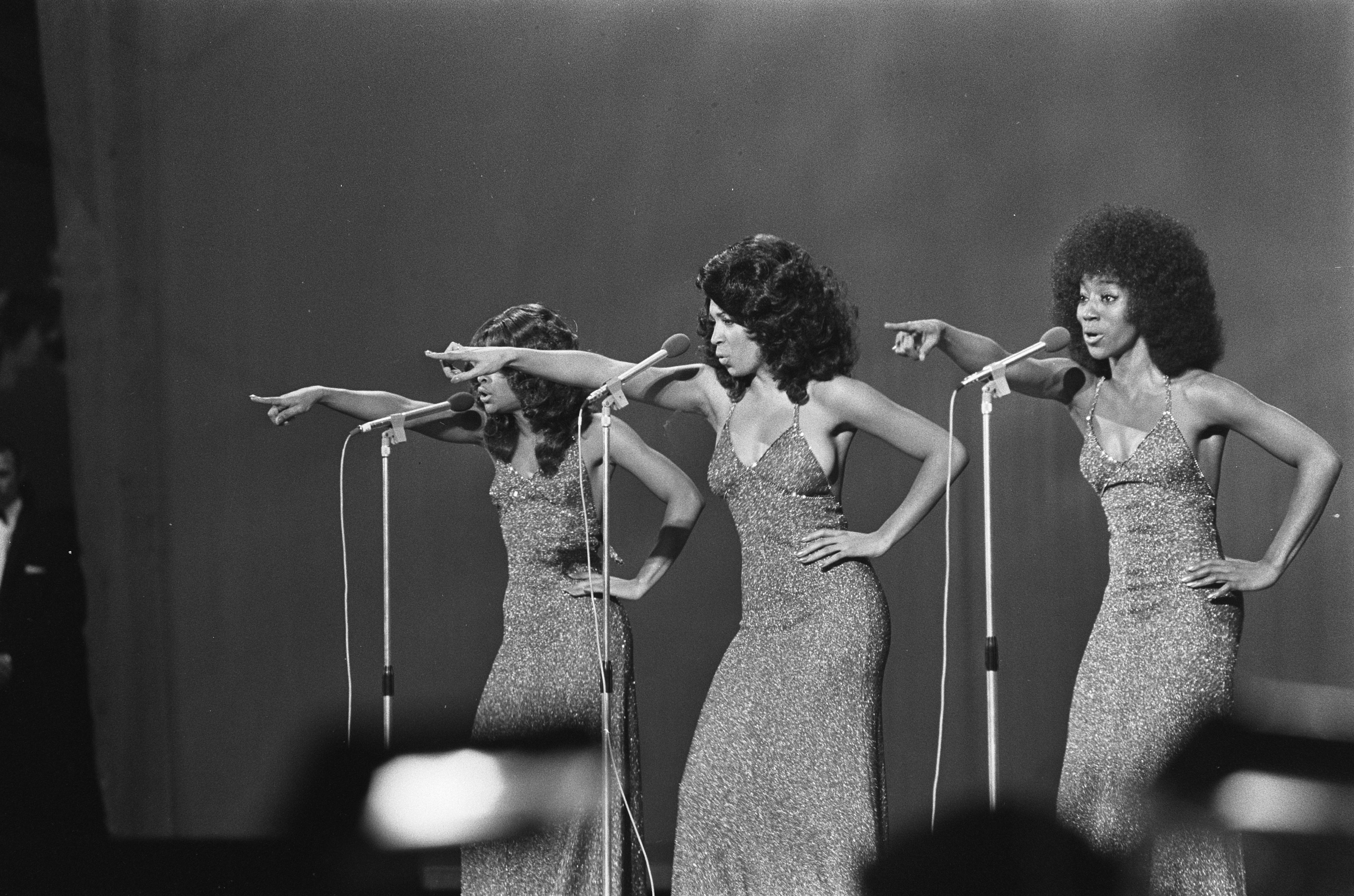
The Three Degrees provided the vocals on the chart-topping single "TSOP (The Sound of Philadelphia)" by MFSB.

Billboard published a weekly chart in 1974 ranking the top-performing singles in the United States in soul music and related African American-oriented music genres; the chart has undergone various name changes over the decades to reflect the evolution of such genres and since 2005 has been published as Hot R&B/Hip-Hop Songs. In 1974, it was published under the title Hot Soul Singles, and 30 different singles topped the chart.

Stevie Wonder had both the first and last number ones of 1974. In the issue of Billboard dated January 5, Wonder spent his second week at number one with "Living for the City". He returned to the top spot in September with "You Haven't Done Nothin'", and gained his third chart-topper of the year when "Boogie On Reggae Woman" reached the peak position in the issue dated December 28, making it the year's final number one. Wonder was one of three acts to take three different singles to number one during 1974, along with James Brown and Gladys Knight & the Pips. The latter two acts each spent a cumulative total of five weeks at number one, placing them in a three-way tie with Roberta Flack for 1974's highest number of weeks atop the chart. Flack's "Feel Like Makin' Love" topped the chart for five consecutive weeks, the year's longest unbroken run at number one, and was ranked by Billboard as the year's best-performing soul single.

Two of 1974's Hot Soul Singles number ones showcased the emerging disco genre, which would go on to dominate American popular music in the latter half of the 1970s. In April, MFSB, the house band at the recording studio operated by producers Kenny Gamble and Leon Huff, topped the chart with "TSOP (The Sound of Philadelphia)", the theme tune from the TV show Soul Train; the song also featured vocals by the girl group the Three Degrees, who had previously entered the top ten twice in their own right. Three months later, George McCrae reached number one with another disco song, "Rock Your Baby"; both singles also topped the all-genre Hot 100 chart. "Can't Get Enough of Your Love, Babe" by Barry White and Stevie Wonder's "You Haven't Done Nothin'" also topped both charts. MFSB, the Three Degrees and McCrae all gained the first number ones of their respective careers in 1974, as did a large number of other acts. William DeVaughn, Kool & the Gang, Blue Magic, B. T. Express, Latimore, Shirley Brown, Rufus featuring Chaka Khan, and Tavares all made their first appearances at the top of the chart during the year.

== Chart history ==
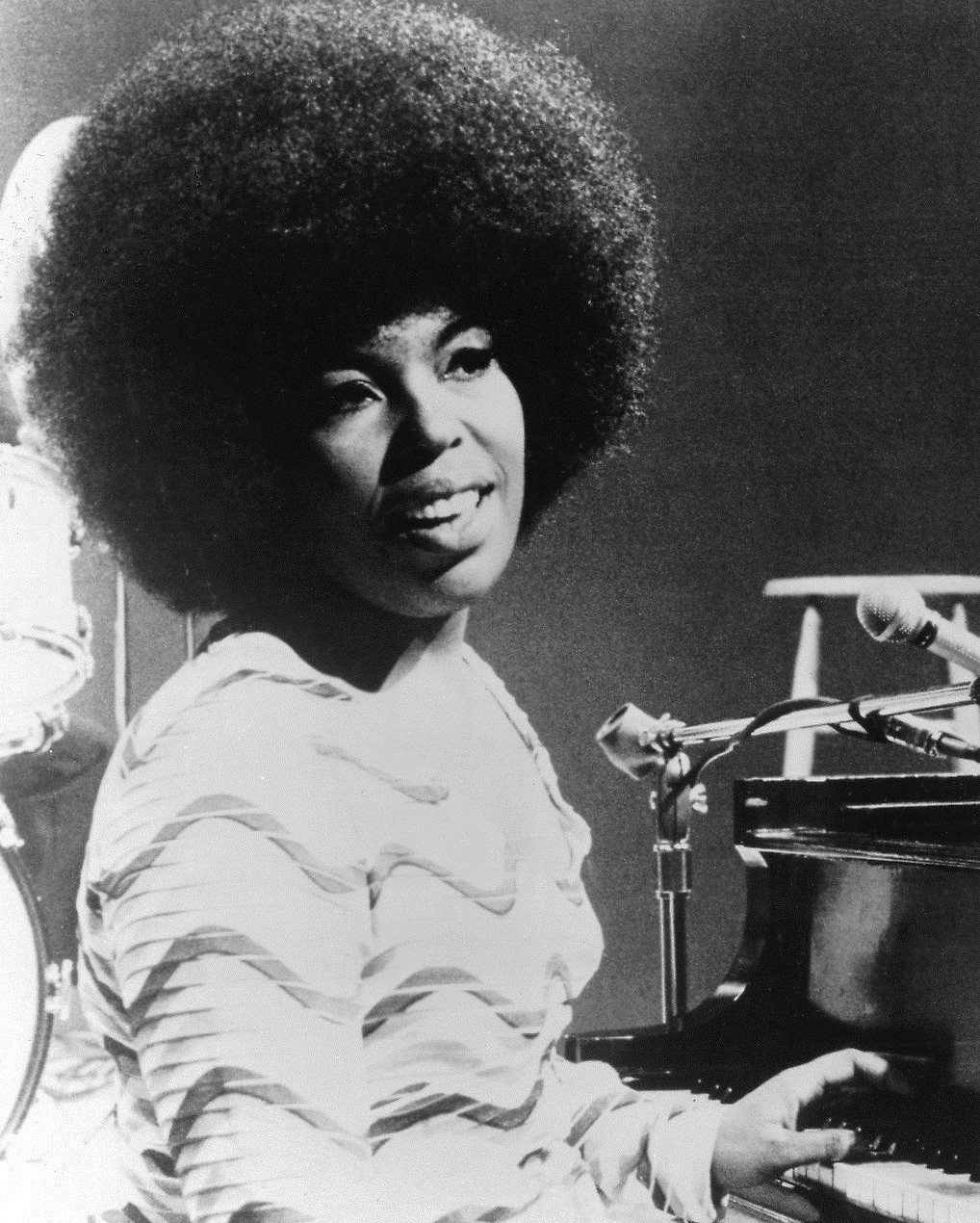
Roberta Flack spent five weeks at number one with "Feel Like Makin' Love", which Billboard ranked as the best-performing soul single of the year.

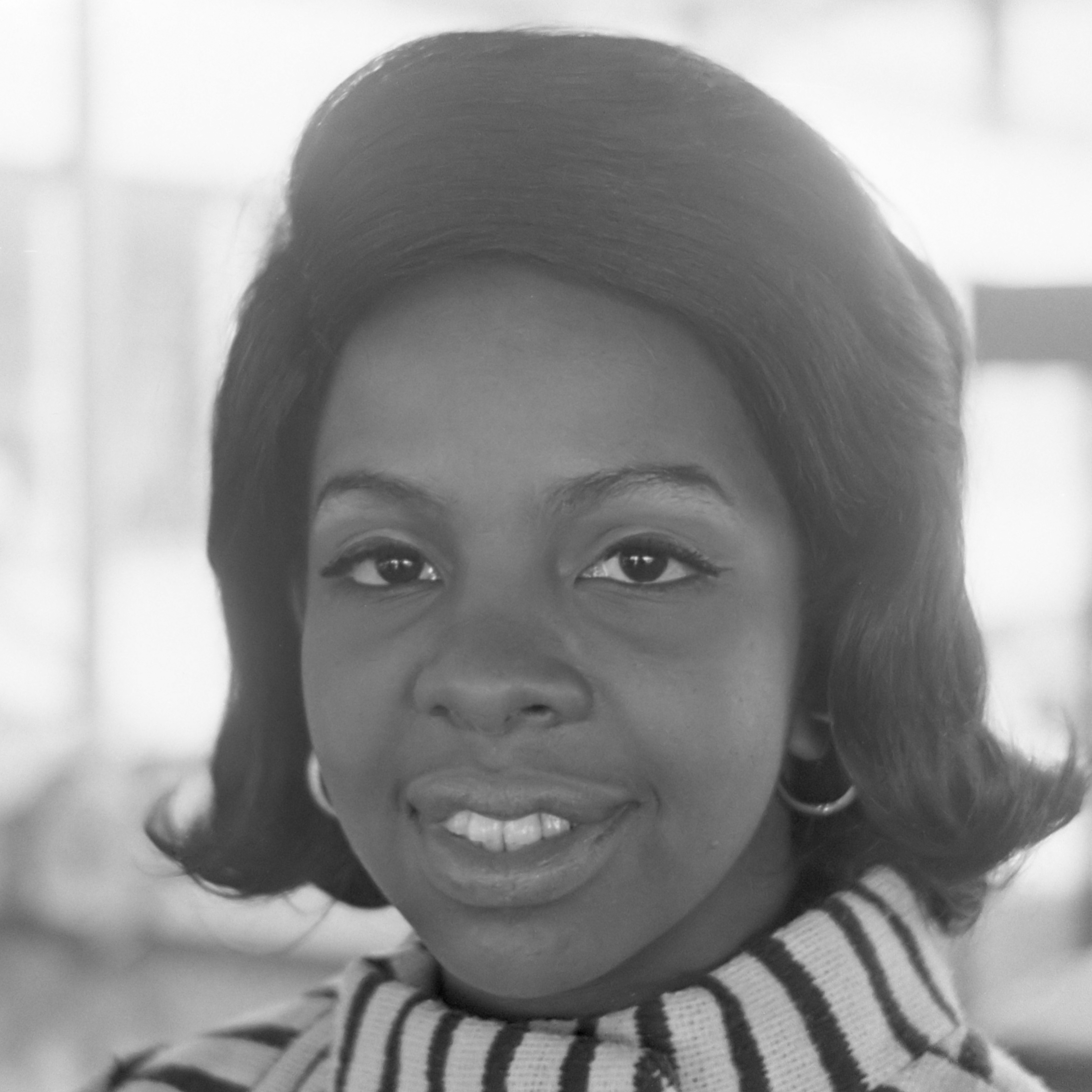
Gladys Knight & the Pips (Knight pictured) had three number ones in 1974.

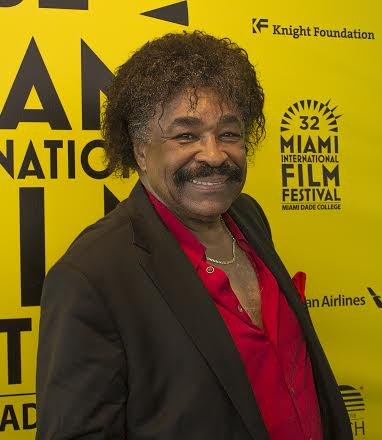
"Rock Your Baby" by George McCrae (pictured in later life) topped both the soul chart and the all-genre Hot 100 listing.

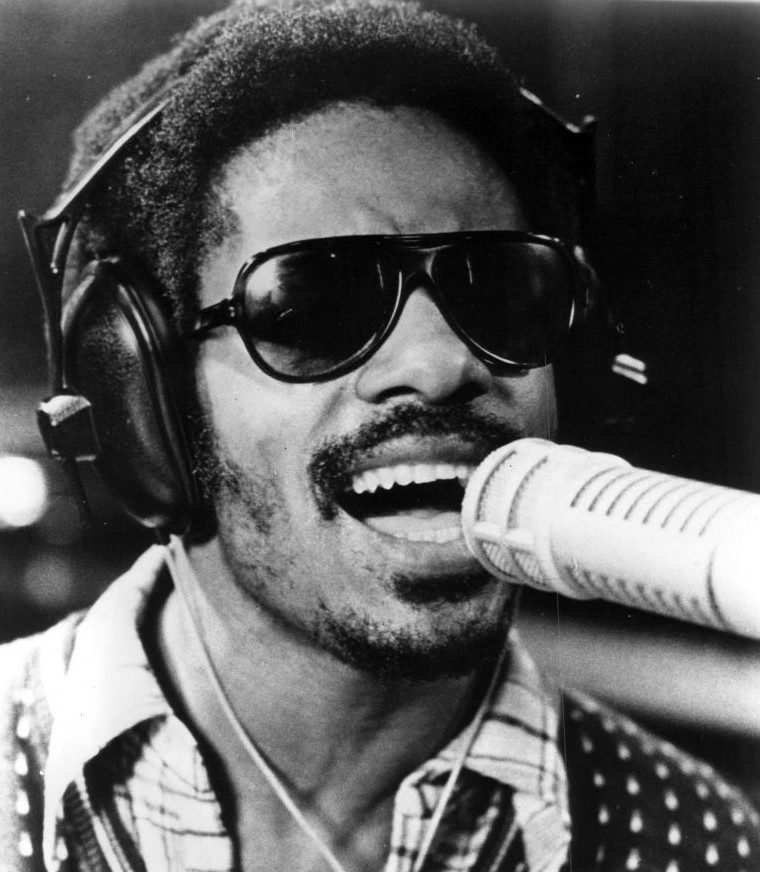
Stevie Wonder had three number ones in 1974.

Key
†	Indicates number 1 on Billboard's year-end soul chart

Chart history
Issue date	Title	Artist(s)	Ref.
January 5	"Living for the City"	Stevie Wonder	
January 12	"Until You Come Back to Me (That's What I'm Gonna Do)"	Aretha Franklin	
January 19	"I've Got to Use My Imagination"	Gladys Knight & the Pips	
January 26	"Livin' for You"	Al Green	
February 2	"Let Your Hair Down"	The Temptations	
February 9	"Boogie Down"	Eddie Kendricks	
February 16	"Boogie Down"	Eddie Kendricks	
February 23	"Boogie Down"	Eddie Kendricks	
March 2	"Mighty Love"	The Spinners	
March 9	"Mighty Love"	The Spinners	
March 16	"Lookin' for a Love"	Bobby Womack	
March 23	"Lookin' for a Love"	Bobby Womack	
March 30	"Lookin' for a Love"	Bobby Womack	
April 6	"Best Thing That Ever Happened to Me"	Gladys Knight & the Pips	
April 13	"Best Thing That Ever Happened to Me"	Gladys Knight & the Pips	
April 20	"TSOP (The Sound of Philadelphia)"	MFSB with The Three Degrees	
April 27	"The Payback, Pt. 1"	James Brown	
May 4	"The Payback, Pt. 1"	James Brown	
May 11	"Dancing Machine"	The Jackson 5	
May 18	"I'm in Love"	Aretha Franklin	
May 25	"I'm in Love"	Aretha Franklin	
June 1	"Be Thankful for What You Got"	William DeVaughn	
June 8	"Hollywood Swinging"	Kool & the Gang	
June 15	"Sideshow"	Blue Magic	
June 22	"Finally Got Myself Together (I'm a Changed Man)"	The Impressions	
June 29	"Finally Got Myself Together (I'm a Changed Man)"	The Impressions	
July 6	"Rock Your Baby"	George McCrae	
July 13	"Rock Your Baby"	George McCrae	
July 20	"My Thang (Part 1)"	James Brown	
July 27	"My Thang (Part 1)"	James Brown	
August 3	"Feel Like Makin' Love" †	Roberta Flack	
August 10	"Feel Like Makin' Love" †	Roberta Flack	
August 17	"Feel Like Makin' Love" †	Roberta Flack	
August 24	"Feel Like Makin' Love" †	Roberta Flack	
August 31	"Feel Like Makin' Love" †	Roberta Flack	
September 7	"Can't Get Enough of Your Love, Babe"	Barry White	
September 14	"Can't Get Enough of Your Love, Babe"	Barry White	
September 21	"Can't Get Enough of Your Love, Babe"	Barry White	
September 28	"You Haven't Done Nothin'"	Stevie Wonder	
October 5	"You Haven't Done Nothin'"	Stevie Wonder	
October 12	"Papa Don't Take No Mess (Part 1)"	James Brown	
October 19	"Do It ('Til You're Satisfied)"	B.T. Express	
October 26	"Higher Plane"	Kool & the Gang	
November 2	"Let's Straighten It Out"	Latimore	
November 9	"Let's Straighten It Out"	Latimore	
November 16	"Woman to Woman"	Shirley Brown	
November 23	"Woman to Woman"	Shirley Brown	
November 30	"I Feel a Song (In My Heart)"	Gladys Knight & the Pips	
December 7	"I Feel a Song (In My Heart)"	Gladys Knight & the Pips	
December 14	"You Got the Love"	Rufus featuring Chaka Khan	
December 21	"She's Gone"	Tavares	
December 28	"Boogie On Reggae Woman"	Stevie Wonder	

== See also ==
- Billboard Year-End Hot Soul Singles of 1974
- List of Billboard Hot 100 number-one singles of 1974
