= List of Billboard number-one R&B albums of 1974 =

These are the Billboard magazine R&B albums that reached number-one in 1974.

== Chart history ==
| Issue date | Album | Artist |
|---|---|---|
| January 5 | Imagination | Gladys Knight & the Pips |
| January 12 | Imagination | Gladys Knight & the Pips |
| January 19 | Imagination | Gladys Knight & the Pips |
| January 26 | Imagination | Gladys Knight & the Pips |
| February 2 | Stone Gon' | Barry White |
| February 9 | Stone Gon' | Barry White |
| February 16 | Ship Ahoy | The O'Jays |
| February 23 | Livin' for You | Al Green |
| March 2 | Ship Ahoy | The O'Jays |
| March 9 | Ship Ahoy | The O'Jays |
| March 16 | Love Is the Message | MFSB |
| March 23 | Love Is the Message | MFSB |
| March 30 | Love Is the Message | MFSB |
| April 6 | Love Is the Message | MFSB |
| April 13 | Love Is the Message | MFSB |
| April 20 | Love Is the Message | MFSB |
| April 27 | Boogie Down! | Eddie Kendricks |
| May 4 | The Payback | James Brown |
| May 11 | The Payback | James Brown |
| May 18 | Let Me in Your Life | Aretha Franklin |
| May 25 | Open Our Eyes | Earth, Wind & Fire |
| June 1 | Mighty Love | The Spinners |
| June 8 | Ship Ahoy | The O'Jays |
| June 15 | Ship Ahoy | The O'Jays |
| June 22 | War Live | War |
| June 29 | War Live | War |
| July 6 | Body Heat | Quincy Jones |
| July 13 | Claudine | Soundtrack / Gladys Knight & the Pips |
| July 20 | Skin Tight | The Ohio Players |
| July 27 | Skin Tight | The Ohio Players |
| August 3 | Skin Tight | The Ohio Players |
| August 10 | Skin Tight | The Ohio Players |
| August 17 | Skin Tight | The Ohio Players |
| August 24 | Skin Tight | The Ohio Players |
| August 31 | Marvin Gaye Live! | Marvin Gaye |
| September 7 | That Nigger's Crazy | Richard Pryor |
| September 14 | That Nigger's Crazy | Richard Pryor |
| September 21 | That Nigger's Crazy | Richard Pryor |
| September 28 | That Nigger's Crazy | Richard Pryor |
| October 5 | Fulfillingness' First Finale | Stevie Wonder |
| October 12 | Fulfillingness' First Finale | Stevie Wonder |
| October 19 | Fulfillingness' First Finale | Stevie Wonder |
| October 26 | Fulfillingness' First Finale | Stevie Wonder |
| November 2 | Fulfillingness' First Finale | Stevie Wonder |
| November 9 | Marvin Gaye Live! | Marvin Gaye |
| November 16 | Live It Up | The Isley Brothers |
| November 23 | Can't Get Enough | Barry White |
| November 30 | Can't Get Enough | Barry White |
| December 7 | Fulfillingness' First Finale | Stevie Wonder |
| December 14 | Fulfillingness' First Finale | Stevie Wonder |
| December 21 | Fulfillingness' First Finale | Stevie Wonder |
| December 28 | I Feel a Song | Gladys Knight & the Pips |

== See also ==
- 1974 in music
- R&B number-one hits of 1974 (USA)
