= List of Cash Box Top 100 number-one singles of 1971 =

These are the singles that reached number one on the Top 100 singles chart in 1971 as published in Cashbox magazine.

Issue date	Song	Artist
January 2	"My Sweet Lord"	George Harrison
January 9	"My Sweet Lord"	George Harrison
January 16	"Knock Three Times"	Dawn
January 23	"Knock Three Times"	Dawn
January 30	"Lonely Days"	Bee Gees
February 6	"Rose Garden"	Lynn Anderson
February 13	"One Bad Apple"	The Osmonds
February 20	"One Bad Apple"	The Osmonds
February 27	"One Bad Apple"	The Osmonds
March 6	"Mama's Pearl"	The Jackson 5
March 13	"One Bad Apple"	The Osmonds
March 20	"Just My Imagination (Running Away with Me)"	The Temptations
March 27	"She's a Lady"	Tom Jones
April 3	"Doesn't Somebody Want to Be Wanted"	The Partridge Family
April 10	"What's Going On"	Marvin Gaye
April 17	"Joy to the World"	Three Dog Night
April 24	"Joy to the World"	Three Dog Night
May 1	"Joy to the World"	Three Dog Night
May 8	"Joy to the World"	Three Dog Night
May 15	"Joy to the World"	Three Dog Night
May 22	"Joy to the World"	Three Dog Night
May 29	"Never Can Say Goodbye"	The Jackson 5
June 5	"Want Ads"	The Honey Cone
June 12	"Want Ads"	The Honey Cone
June 19	"It Don't Come Easy"	Ringo Starr
June 26	"It's Too Late"	Carole King
July 3	"It's Too Late"	Carole King
July 10	"It's Too Late"	Carole King
July 17	"It's Too Late"	Carole King
July 24	"Indian Reservation (The Lament of the Cherokee Reservation Indian)"	The Raiders
July 31	"Don't Pull Your Love"	Hamilton, Joe Frank & Reynolds
August 7	"You've Got a Friend"	James Taylor
August 14	"How Can You Mend a Broken Heart?"	Bee Gees
August 21	"How Can You Mend a Broken Heart?"	Bee Gees
August 28	"How Can You Mend a Broken Heart?"	Bee Gees
September 4	"Take Me Home, Country Roads"	John Denver
September 11	"Spanish Harlem"	Aretha Franklin
September 18	"Smiling Faces Sometimes"	Undisputed Truth
September 25	"Uncle Albert/Admiral Halsey"	Paul & Linda McCartney
October 2	"Go Away Little Girl"	Donny Osmond
October 9	"Maggie May"	Rod Stewart
October 16	"Maggie May"	Rod Stewart
October 23	"Maggie May"	Rod Stewart
October 30	"Gypsys, Tramps & Thieves"	Cher
November 6	"Gypsys, Tramps & Thieves"	Cher
November 13	"Theme from Shaft"	Isaac Hayes
November 20	"Theme from Shaft"	Isaac Hayes
November 27	"Family Affair"	Sly & the Family Stone
December 4	"Family Affair"	Sly & the Family Stone
December 11	"Family Affair"	Sly & the Family Stone
December 18	"Family Affair"	Sly & the Family Stone
December 25	"Brand New Key"	Melanie

== See also ==
- 1971 in music
- List of Hot 100 number-one singles of 1971 (U.S.)
