= Precious: Original Motion Picture Soundtrack =

Soundtrack album by various artists
- Released: November 3, 2009
- Recorded: 2009
- Genre: Soul; R&B
- Length: 51:30
- Label: Lionsgate Studios; Matriarch; Geffen
- Producer: Raphael Saadiq; Mary J. Blige

Singles from Precious: Original Motion Picture Soundtrack
- 1. "I Can See in Color" Released: October 13, 2009

Precious: Original Motion Picture Soundtrack is the soundtrack album that accompanied the 2009 film Precious directed by Lee Daniels, released through Matriarch Records and Geffen Records in association with Lionsgate Records on November 3, 2009. The album featured songs performed by various artists, which is a compilation of original songs and covers. Mary J. Blige co-wrote and performed the original song "I Can See in Color" that was released separately as a single.

== Background ==
The accompanying soundtrack featured songs performed by various artists: LaBelle (Nona Hendryx, Sarah Dash, and Patti LaBelle), Donna Allen, Jean Carn, Sunny Gale, MFSB, Queen Latifah, Mahalia Jackson and Grace Hightower. It is a compilation of covers and original songs written specifically for the album. A critic from People, in his review, noted that the film "mainly had a music supervised soundtrack, but not much of a score, so there were popular songs placed in the movie." Regarding the selection of the artists, Daniels recalled that they "resonate not only in Precious's world, but speak to your soul no matter who you are."

Composer Robin Thicke, then married to the film's costar Paula Patton, wrote and produced "Push", the film's original main theme music. However, the song was eventually replaced with another original song "I Can See in Color", performed by Mary J. Blige who co-wrote it with Raphael Saadiq and LaNeah Menzies; Saadiq also produced the song. Daniels confirmed that the song would be released as a single from the album, which was eventually released on October 13, 2009.

The soundtrack was distributed through Lionsgate Records, in association with Blige's music label Matriarch Records and Geffen Records. It was released digitally on November 3, 2009 and in stores on November 24.

== Track listing ==
No.	Title	Writer(s)	Artist	Length
1.	"I Can See in Color"	Mary J. Blige, Raphael Saadiq and LaNeah Menzies	Mary J. Blige	5:33
2.	"He Is the Joy"	Marc Pomeroy, Brian Tappert	Donna Allen	7:45
3.	"Was That All It Was"	Jerry Butler, John Usry Jr., Linda Conlon	Jean Carn	3:43
4.	"Did You Ever See a Dream Walking?"	Harry Revel, Mack Gordon	Sunny Gale	2:27
5.	"Come Into My House"	Dana Owens, Mark James	Queen Latifah	4:12
6.	"Just a Closer Walk with Thee"	Traditional	Mahalia Jackson	1:51
7.	"Love Is the Message"	Kenneth Gamble, Leon Huff	MFSB feat. The Three Degrees	4:06
8.	"Now That I Know Who I Am"	Nona Hendryx	Nona Hendryx	4:17
9.	"System"	Nona Hendryx	Labelle	5:33
10.	"Somethin's Comin' My Way"	Dan Manjovi	Grace Hightower	4:33
11.	"It Took a Long Time"	Bob Crewe, Lawrence Russell Brown, Raymond Bloodworth	Labelle	4:03
12.	"Letters"	Mario Grigorov	Mario Grigorov	3:54
Total length:				51:30

== Reception ==
Peter Travers of Rolling Stone praised the album, and described the song, "I Can See In Color" as being "...a knockout song...expressing the goal of Precious to see the world in color." Writing for Allmusic, James Christopher Monger described the album as featuring "solid offerings from both contemporary and classic", crediting the contributions from Latifah, Hightower, Jackson and LaBelle, and stated that the album resulted "in a solid and empowering collection that (in the words of [the film's director Lee] Daniels) "resonate not only in Precious's world, but speak to your soul no matter who you are." Todd Martens and Margaret Wappler of The Seattle Times described it as "an upbeat collection of self-discovery songs, modern-day gospel for the therapy crowd". Sasha Tandlich of Collider wrote "The film's soundtrack is used as a way to blend Precious's imagination with the reality of her terrifying home life, bridging the two aspects together."

== Additional music ==
The trailer features the song "Destiny" taken from Blige's 2001 album No More Drama. Leona Lewis's song, "Happy" (from her album Echo) is featured in the film's trailer. A song titled "My Good Lovin' (Back Like That Remix)", featuring Da Brat and Lil' Mo, was featured in the film but exempted from the soundtrack.

== Accolades ==
At the 14th Satellite Awards, the song "I Can See in Color" performed by Blige, was nominated for Best Original Song.
