= MFSB (album) =

Studio album by MFSB
- Released: 1973
- Recorded: 1972
- Studio: Sigma Sound, Philadelphia, Pennsylvania
- Genre: Philadelphia soul
- Length: 33:09
- Label: Philadelphia International
- Producer: Kenneth Gamble, Leon Huff

MFSB chronology
MFSB (1973)	Love Is the Message (1973)

MFSB is the debut album by Philadelphia International Records houseband MFSB, released in 1973.

== Reception ==
Professional ratings
Review scores
Source	Rating
AllMusic	3/5 stars
Pitchfork	7.6/10

It also included instrumental covers of "Back Stabbers" by The O'Jays, "Family Affair" by Sly & The Family Stone, and "Freddie's Dead" by Curtis Mayfield.

The 2002 reissue on Epic/Legacy Records adds a live version of "TSOP (The Sound of Philadelphia)". The only single from the album was "Family Affair", having "Lay In Low", as a B-side. The third track, "Something for Nothing" was sampled by Groove Armada (feat. Jeru the Damaja) for their track Suntoucher, Tracey Lee on his 1997 album Many Facez with the song "Keep Your Hands High" featuring The Notorious B.I.G, as well as Jay-Z's 2003 song "What More Can I Say", Canibus' song "How We Roll" and JoJo's "Breezy" from her debut album.

== Track listing ==
1. "Freddie's Dead" (Curtis Mayfield) - 7:12
2. "Family Affair" (Sylvester Stewart) - 4:21
3. "Something for Nothing" (Kenneth Gamble, Roland Chambers, Thom Bell) - 2:59
4. "Back Stabbers" (Gene McFadden, John Whitehead, Leon Huff) - 6:30
5. "Lay In Low" (Leon Huff) - 3:43
6. "Poinciana" (Buddy Bernier, Nat Simon) - 5:50

=== 2002 Reissue ===
7. "TSOP (The Sound of Philadelphia)" (Kenneth Gamble, Leon Huff) - 3:54

== Personnel ==
MFSB

- Bobby Eli, Norman Harris, Reggie Lucas, Roland Chambers, T.J. Tindall - guitar
- Anthony Jackson, Ron Baker - bass
- Leon Huff, Lenny Pakula, Eddie Green, Harold "Ivory" Williams - keyboards
- Earl Young, Karl Chambers, Norman Farrington - drums
- Larry Washington - percussion
- Vincent Montana, Jr. - vibraphone
- Zach Zachery, Tony Williams - saxophone
- Don Renaldo and his Strings and Horns

== Charts ==
Chart (1973)	Peak
U.S. Billboard Top LPs	131
U.S. Billboard Top Soul LPs	20
