= Addams Family Values (soundtrack) =

Addams Family Values: Music from the Motion Picture

Soundtrack album by various artists
- Released: November 16, 1993
- Genre: Hip hop; R&B; funk
- Length: 48:46
- Label: Atlas
- Producer: Salaam Remi; Ralph Sall; P.M. Dawn

Professional ratings
Review scores
Source	Rating
AllMusic	2/5 stars
Los Angeles Times	3/4 stars
Music Week	3/5 stars
The Philadelphia Inquirer	2.5/4 stars

The Addams Family Values: Music from the Motion Picture album was released on Atlas Records in late 1993 to promote Addams Family Values, a sequel to the 1991 film The Addams Family.

== Overview ==
The album features several hip-hop and R&B based cover songs of 1970s funk/soul songs by artists, including:

- Charles & Eddie, who cover Ben E. King's "Supernatural Thing" (composed by Haras Fyre)
- H-Town, who cover The Isley Brothers' "It's Your Thing"
- Shabba Ranks, Patra, and Terri & Monica, who cover Sly & the Family Stone's "Family Affair"
- R. Kelly and Mad Cobra (who cover Isaac Hayes' "Do Your Thing").

A remixed version of Tag Team's then-current hit "Whoomp! (There It Is)", "Addams Family (Whoomp!)", was used as the lead single.

Paramount Pictures had signed Michael Jackson to record a horror-themed song for the film and to promote it with a video. In an attempt to cope with the negative publicity from accusations of child molestation, Jackson turned to prescription drugs and had to undergo a lengthy rehabilitation. He was unable to finish the video and his song, "Family Thing", was dropped from the film.

== Track listing ==
1. "It's Your Thing", performed by H-Town – 3:59
2. "Be Thankful for What You Got", performed by Portrait – 4:37
3. "Express Yourself", performed by Roger and Fu-Schnickens – 5:31
4. "Whatcha See Is Whatcha Get", performed by RuPaul – 4:50
5. "Family Affair", performed by Shabba Ranks, Patra, with Terri & Monica – 4:29
6. "Night People", performed by Brian McKnight – 4:29
7. "Supernatural Thing", performed by Charles & Eddie – 4:35
8. "Do Your Thing (Love On)", performed by R. Kelly and Mad Cobra – 4:35
9. "Do It Any Way You Wanna (It's on You)", performed by Guru – 4:28
10. "May You Always Drink Bizarre", performed by P.M. Dawn – 3:23
11. "Addams Family (Whoomp!)", performed by Tag Team – 3:50
