= Ship Ahoy (album) =

Studio album by the O'Jays
- Released: November 10, 1973
- Studios: Sigma Sound, Philadelphia, Pennsylvania
- Genre: Soul
- Length: 48:13
- Label: Philadelphia International
- Producers: Kenny Gamble, Leon Huff

The O'Jays chronology
Back Stabbers (1972)	Ship Ahoy (1973)	Survival (1975)

Ship Ahoy is the seventh album by Philadelphia soul group the O'Jays, released in 1973 on Philadelphia International Records. The album was a critical and commercial success, entering Billboard on November 10, and reaching No. 11. It reached No. 1 on the "Black Albums" chart and launched two hit singles, "For the Love of Money" and "Put Your Hands Together." Conceived as a theme album built around the title track, Ship Ahoy includes socially relevant tracks and love songs under a cover that is itself notable for its serious subject matter. The album, which achieved RIAA platinum certification in 1992 for over 1 million copies sold, has been reissued multiple times, including in a 2003 edition with a bonus track. Ship Ahoy was the highest selling R&B album on the Billboard Year-End chart for 1974.

== Songs and music ==
The songs on Ship Ahoy balance the romantic with the politically and socially conscious. In its review of the 2003 re-issue, Rolling Stone noted that the album's "main achievement was proving that it was indeed possible to be thoughtful and articulate without losing your funk."

The album's lead single was "Put Your Hands Together," a song urging cooperation and optimistic prayer for "a better day to come." Rickey Vincent, author of Funk: The Music, the People, and the Rhythm of the One, describes the song as "fairly standard musically", "with a strong gospel feel." The second single, "For the Love of Money," is a protest against materialism with a groove that Rolling Stone described as "downright orgiastic". The song was written around a bass line composed by Anthony Jackson, which in 2005 Bass Player Magazine described as "landmark." Bass Player went on to note that the song has "become one of the most recycled singles ever, sampled continually by rappers, and appearing on over 75 compilation CDs, numerous movie soundtracks, and, most recently, the theme for TV's The Apprentice."

The album's almost ten-minute long title song, "Ship Ahoy," was built around the theme of African captives being transported in a slave ship as part of the Middle Passage of the Atlantic slave trade. It had originally been penned by Gamble and Huff for inclusion in the soundtrack to Shaft in Africa, but the producers decided instead to give it to the O'Jays as part of a concept album centered around slavery. The song brought in the sounds of waves and cracking whips to add immediacy to lyrics which, according to PopMatters, personalized "the 'voyage' in ways that few black popular artifacts had previously done so—some three years before the publication of Alex Haley's Roots. The book A Change is Gonna Come: Music, Race and the Soul of America notes that unlike the seminal work by Haley, "Ship Ahoy" is a hopeless, ominous song that offers "no sense that things are going to work out fine." In its 1974 review of the album, The New York Times characterized the song as "dark and occasionally spine-chilling." In 1993, The Miami Herald called it "a dark, atmospheric, frightening masterpiece that'll send a shiver up your spine."

In 1995, The Los Angeles Times dubbed "Ship Ahoy", along with the song "Don't Call Me Brother" as among "[t]he cream of the vocal trio's angry music." "Don't Call Me Brother" is a nearly nine-minute long album track that protests hypocritical claims of racial unity from backstabbers.

== Artwork ==
The cover of the album depicted the band in a slave hold with illustrations of slaves. In its review, PopMatters commented that the use by producers Gamble and Huff of this imagery demonstrated not only their freedom as the heads of Philadelphia International Records, but also "how seriously the duo viewed popular music as a vehicle to 'teach and preach'." According to The Greatest Album Covers of All Time, the production of such politically conscious imagery from a band known for its popular music "was enough to make even the most myopic of white music fans take note that something was changing." Illustrator James Barkley was otherwise better known for illustrating children's books and a postage stamp—a 1972 image of Denali, Alaska—along with commercial design and other nature paintings.

== Reception ==
Professional ratings
Review scores
Source	Rating
AllMusic	4.5/5 stars
Christgau's Record Guide	B
Mojo	(favorable)
The Music Box	4/5 stars
The New York Times	(favorable)
PopMatters	(favorable)
Rolling Stone 1974	(favorable)
Rolling Stone 2003	4/5 stars
Rolling Stone 2004	4.5/5 stars
Yahoo! Music	(favorable)

Ship Ahoy reached No. 1 on Billboard's "Black Albums" chart and No. 11 on the "Pop Albums" chart and contained two hit singles, "For the Love of Money" (No. 3 "Black Singles", No. 9 "Pop Singles") and "Put Your Hands Together" (No. 2 "Black Singles", No. 10 "Pop Singles"). The album certified "Gold" by the RIAA on January 21, 1974, and "Platinum" on August 11, 1992.

In addition to its commercial success, the album was critically well received. In a 1974 review, The New York Times described it as "[a] fine recent album" representing producers "Gamble and Huff at their creative best". AllMusic describes the album in its review as "[t]he "other" O'Jays album masterpiece", with "shattering message tracks and stunning love songs".

== Releases ==
The album has been reissued multiple times by Philadelphia International as well as Epic Records, Legacy Records, Columbia Records, Sony Records and Sis Records. In 2003, it was re-released by Sony and Epic with a bonus track, a live version of "Put Your Hands Together" recorded in London in 1974.

== Track listing ==
All tracks written by Kenneth Gamble and Leon Huff, except where noted.

Side one

1. "Put Your Hands Together" – 4:07
2. "Ship Ahoy" – 9:41
3. "This Air I Breathe" (Gamble, Bunny Sigler) – 3:53
4. "You Got Your Hooks in Me" (Sigler) – 5:34

Side two

1. "For the Love of Money" (Gamble, Huff, Anthony Jackson) – 7:19
2. "Now That We Found Love" – 4:41
3. "Don't Call Me Brother" (Gamble, Sigler) – 8:58
4. "People Keep Tellin' Me" (John Whitehead, Gene McFadden, Victor Carstarphen) – 4:00

== Personnel ==
Performers

- Lenny Pakula – arranger
- Leon Isley Brooks – keyboards
- Anthony Jackson – bass
- Eddie Levert – vocals
- MFSB – orchestra, various instruments
- William Powell – vocals
- Walter Williams – vocals
- Rocco Bene – trumpet solos

Production

- James Barkley – illustration
- Steven Berkowitz – A&R
- Kenny Gamble – producer, surround mix
- Norman Harris – arranger
- Leon Huff – producer, surround mix
- Don Hunstein – photography
- Ed Lee – art direction
- Bobby Martin – arranger
- Lenny Pakula – arranger
- Joseph M. Palmaccio – mastering
- Darcy Proper – mastering
- Al Quaglieri – remix producer
- Leo Sacks – reissue producer
- Joe Tarsia – engineer

== Charts ==
=== Weekly charts ===
Chart (1973–1974)	Peak position
US Billboard 200	11
US Top R&B/Hip-Hop Albums (Billboard)	1

=== Year-end charts ===
Chart (1974)	Position
US Billboard 200	18
US Top R&B/Hip-Hop Albums (Billboard)	1

== See also ==
- List of number-one R&B albums of 1974 (U.S.)
