= Love Is the Message (MFSB album) =

Studio album by MFSB
- Released: 1973
- Recorded: 1973
- Studios: Sigma Sound, Philadelphia, Pennsylvania
- Genres: Philadelphia soul; disco
- Length: 35:06
- Label: Philadelphia International
- Producers: Kenneth Gamble, Leon Huff, Vince Montana, Bruce Hawes, Jack Faith

MFSB chronology
MFSB (1973)	Love Is the Message (1973)	Universal Love (1975)

Singles from Love Is the Message
- 1. "TSOP (The Sound of Philadelphia)" Released: February 6, 1974; 2. "Love Is the Message" Released: June 7, 1974

Professional ratings
Review scores
Source	Rating
AllMusic	4.5/5 stars

Love Is the Message is the second album by Philadelphia International Records’ house band MFSB, released in 1973. The album includes the number one pop, R&B, and adult contemporary hit and winner of the 1974 Grammy for Best R&B Instrumental Performance, "TSOP (The Sound of Philadelphia)". The song was the theme song for the television show Soul Train. In 2022, Rolling Stone ranked "Love Is the Message" number 53 in their list of the "200 Greatest Dance Songs of All Time".

== Late 1970s resurgence ==
In the transition period between disco and the up-and-coming hip hop movement, the title track became a staple at house and block party events in the summers of 1978 and 1979. That track later became the basis for the last Salsoul Orchestra single "Ooh, I Love It (Love Break)", released in 1983.

== Track listing ==
Side one
No.	Title	Writer(s)	Length
1.	"Zack's Fanfare"	Burton Lane, Frank Loesser	0:23
2.	"Love Is the Message"	Kenneth Gamble, Leon Huff	6:35
3.	"Cheaper to Keep Her"	Mack Rice	6:52
4.	"My One and Only Love"	Guy Wood, Robert Mellin	4:34

Side two
No.	Title	Writer(s)	Length
5.	"TSOP (The Sound of Philadelphia)" (Theme from the television show Soul Train)	Kenneth Gamble, Leon Huff	3:43
6.	"Zack's Fanfare (I Hear Music)"	Burton Lane, Frank Loesser	0:50
7.	"Touch Me in the Morning"	Michael Masser, Ron Miller	6:21
8.	"Bitter Sweet"	Bruce Hawes, Jack Faith	5:26

== Personnel ==
MFSB

- Bobby Eli, Norman Harris, Reggie Lucas, Roland Chambers, T.J. Tindall - guitar
- Anthony Jackson, Ron Baker - bass
- Leon Huff, Lenny Pakula, Eddie Green, Harold "Ivory" Williams - keyboards
- Earl Young, Karl Chambers, Norman Farrington - drums
- Larry Washington - percussion
- Vincent Montana, Jr. - vibraphone
- Zach Zachery, Tony Williams - saxophone
- Don Renaldo and his Strings and Horns
- The Three Degrees - vocals (5)

== Charts ==
Chart (1974)	Peak position
Australia (Kent Music Report)	55
Canada Top Albums (RPM)	6
US Billboard Top LPs	4
US Top Soul LPs (Billboard)	1
US Top Jazz LPs (Billboard)	4

=== Year-end charts ===
Chart (1974)	Position
Canada (RPM)	52

=== Singles ===
Year	Single	Peak chart positions		
Year	Single	US	US R&B	US A/C
1974	"TSOP (The Sound of Philadelphia)"	1	1	1
1974	"Love Is the Message"	85	42	—

== Certifications ==
Region	Certification	Certified units/sales
United States (RIAA)	Gold	500,000^{^}
^{^} Shipments figures based on certification alone.

== See also ==
- List of number-one R&B albums of 1974 (U.S.)
