= As Long as I Have You (album) =

Studio album by Roger Daltrey
- Released: 1 June 2018
- Recorded: March 2014–2018
- Length: 37:19
- Label: Polydor
- Producer: Dave Eringa

Roger Daltrey chronology
Going Back Home (2014)	As Long as I Have You (2018)

Singles from As Long as I Have You
- 1. "As Long as I Have You" Released: 15 March 2018; 2. "How Far" Released: 11 May 2018

As Long as I Have You is the tenth solo studio album by the English rock singer Roger Daltrey, released on 1 June 2018 by Polydor Records.

== Overview ==
Work on As Long as I Have You was started shortly after Going Back Home was released in March 2014. Following his seven-month battle with viral meningitis, Daltrey planned on shelving the project until Pete Townshend heard the early mixes and expressed interest in playing rhythm and lead guitar. Recording continued during breaks on the Who's 50th anniversary tour, The Who Hits 50!

As Long as I Have You features Townshend's guitar on seven tracks as well as guest performances from Mick Talbot of the Style Council on keyboards and Sean Genockey on lead guitar.

The album is a mixture of self-penned tracks such as "Certified Rose" and the soulful ballad "Always Heading Home" along with songs that have inspired Daltrey over the years including Nick Cave's "Into My Arms", "You Haven't Done Nothing" by Stevie Wonder, Stephen Stills' "How Far" and the title track originally recorded by Garnet Mimms in 1964, the year that Roger Daltrey, Pete Townshend, John Entwistle and Keith Moon changed their name from the High Numbers and became the Who.

== Release ==
As Long as I Have You is available on a number of formats: CD, 180g black vinyl, limited 180g red vinyl housed in a Polydor disco bag, and digitally (download and streaming). All those who pre-ordered the album in any format were also entered in a contest to receive one out of ten test vinyl pressings signed by Daltrey.

== Critical reception ==
Professional ratings
Aggregate scores
Source	Rating
Metacritic	76/100
Review scores
Source	Rating
AllMusic	4/5 stars
Paste	6.8/10
Rolling Stone	3.5/5 stars

As Long as I Have You received generally positive reviews from critics. At Metacritic, which assigns a normalized rating out of 100 to reviews from mainstream publications, the album received an average score of 76 based on 8 reviews. Aggregator Album of the Year gave the release a 61 out of 100 based on a critical consensus of 6 reviews.

== Track listing ==
No.	Title	Writer(s)	Length
1.	"As Long as I Have You"	Bob Elgin, Jerry Ragovoy	3:18
2.	"How Far"	Stephen Stills (credited as Steve Stills)	3:03
3.	"Where Is a Man to Go?" (original title: "Where Is a Woman to Go?")	Jerry Gillespie, K. T. Oslin	4:04
4.	"Get On Out of the Rain" (original title: "Come In Out of the Rain")	Ruth Copeland, Clyde Wilson, Roger Daltrey	3:31
5.	"I've Got Your Love"	Boz Scaggs	3:29
6.	"Into My Arms"	Nick Cave	4:09
7.	"You Haven't Done Nothing"	Stevie Wonder	3:57
8.	"Out of Sight, Out of Mind"	Clyde Otis, Ivy Jo Hunter	2:04
9.	"Certified Rose"	Daltrey, Gerard McMahon	3:14
10.	"The Love You Save"	Joe Tex	3:06
11.	"Always Heading Home"	Daltrey, Nigel Hinton	3:26
Total length:			37:19

Japanese edition bonus track
No.	Title	Writer(s)	Length
12.	"How Far" (Acoustic)	Stephen Stills (credited as Steve Stills)	3:03
Total length:			40:28

== Personnel ==
- Roger Daltrey – lead vocals (all tracks)
- Pete Townshend – acoustic & electric guitars (tracks 1–5, 7, 9)
- John Hogg – bass (tracks 1–4, 7–10); acoustic guitar (tracks 2, 9); backing vocals (tracks 1–4)
- Jeremy Stacey – drums & percussion (tracks 1–4, 7–8, 10)
- Regina McCrary – backing vocals (tracks 1, 3–5, 7–8, 10); tambourine (track 4)
- Beverly Ann McCrary – backing vocals (tracks 1, 3–5, 7–8, 10)
- Alfreda McCrary – backing vocals (tracks 1, 3–5, 7–8, 10)
- Deborah McCrary – backing vocals (tracks 1, 3–5, 7–8, 10)
- Matt Holland – trumpet (tracks 1, 7–10); all brass arrangements
- Martin Winning – saxophone (tracks 1, 4, 7–10)
- Roy Agee – trombone (tracks 1, 7–8, 10)
- David Catlin-Birch – bass (track 5)
- Liam Genockey – drums (tracks 5, 9)
- Jon Button – double bass (tracks 6, 11)
- Barnaby Dickinson – trombone (tracks 8–9)
- Geraint Watkins – piano (track 11)
- Andy Cutting – melodian (track 11)
- Ian Burdge – cello (track 11)
- Dave Eringa – additional percussion & programming (tracks 1–5, 7–11); tubular bells (track 6)
- Sean Genockey – guitars (as guest musician) [tracks 1–5, 7–10]
- Mick Talbot – keyboards (as guest musician) [tracks 1, 3–10]

== Charts ==
Chart (2018)	Peak position
Austrian Albums (Ö3 Austria)	34
Belgian Albums (Ultratop Flanders)	64
Belgian Albums (Ultratop Wallonia)	102
German Albums (Offizielle Top 100)	26
Japanese Albums (Oricon)	148
New Zealand Heatseeker Albums (RMNZ)	9
Scottish Albums (Official Charts)	4
Swiss Albums (Schweizer Hitparade)	34
UK Albums (Official Charts)	8
US Billboard 200	194
US Top Album Sales (Billboard)	28
US Top Rock Albums (Billboard)	40
US Indie Store Album Sales (Billboard)	11

== See also ==
- Roger Daltrey discography
