= Universal Love =

Studio album by MFSB
- Released: 1975
- Recorded: 1974–1975
- Studios: Sigma Sound, Philadelphia, Pennsylvania
- Genres: Philadelphia soul; disco
- Label: Philadelphia International
- Producers: Kenneth Gamble, Leon Huff, Bruce Hawes, Bobby Martin, Broadway Eddie

MFSB chronology
| Love Is the Message (1973) | Universal Love (1975) | Philadelphia Freedom (1975) |

Professional ratings
Review scores
| Source | Rating |
|---|---|
| AllMusic | 4/5 stars |

Universal Love is the third album released by Philadelphia International Records houseband MFSB.

"My Mood" is used on the closing credits on Friday evenings on NBC4, WRC-TV in Washington, DC.

Included is a cover of The Nite-Liters's 1971 single "K-Jee" which was included in the 1977 movie and soundtrack Saturday Night Fever.

== Track listing ==
Side one
| No. | Title | Writer(s) | Length |
|---|---|---|---|
| 1. | "Sexy" | Kenneth Gamble, Leon Huff | 3:33 |
| 2. | "MFSB" | Kenneth Gamble, Leon Huff | 3:42 |
| 3. | "Human Machine" | Leon Huff, Ronnie Baker | 3:52 |
| 4. | "Love Has No Time or Place" | Cynthia Biggs, Bruce Hawes | 6:18 |

Side two
| No. | Title | Writer(s) | Length |
|---|---|---|---|
| 5. | "T.L.C. (Tender Lovin' Care)" | Bobby Martin, Norman Harris | 3:41 |
| 6. | "Let's Go Disco" | John Whitehead, Kenneth Gamble, Leon Huff, Gene McFadden, Victor Carstarphen, Cary Gilbert | 4:14 |
| 7. | "K-Jee" | Charles Hearndon | 4:15 |
| 8. | "My Mood" | Kenneth Gamble, Leon Huff | 4:10 |

== Personnel ==
MFSB

- Bobby Eli, Norman Harris, Reggie Lucas, Roland Chambers, T.J. Tindall – guitar
- Anthony Jackson, Ron Baker – bass
- Leon Huff, Lenny Pakula, Eddie Green, Harold "Ivory" Williams – keyboards
- Earl Young, Karl Chambers, Norman Farrington – drums
- Larry Washington – percussion
- Vincent Montana, Jr. – vibraphone
- Zach Zachery, Tony Williams – saxophone
- Don Renaldo and his Strings and Horns

== Charts ==
| Chart (1975) | Peak |
|---|---|
| U.S. Billboard Top LPs | 44 |
| U.S. Billboard Top Soul LPs | 2 |

=== Singles ===
| Year | Single | Peak chart positions | | |
| Year | Single | US | US R&B | US Dance |
|---|---|---|---|---|
| 1975 | "Sexy" | 42 | 2 | 2 |
| 1975 | "T.L.C. (Tender Lovin' Care)" | — | 54 | — |
| 1975 | "K-Jee" | — | — | 18 |
