= Fulfillingness' First Finale =

1974 studio album by Stevie Wonder

Studio album by Stevie Wonder
- Released: July 22, 1974
- Studio: Record Plant, Los Angeles; Westlake, Los Angeles; Mediasound, New York City; Electric Lady, New York City
- Genre: Progressive soul
- Length: 42:21
- Label: Tamla
- Producer: Stevie Wonder; Robert Margouleff (assoc.); Malcolm Cecil (assoc.)

Stevie Wonder chronology
Innervisions (1973)	Fulfillingness' First Finale (1974)	Songs in the Key of Life (1976)

Singles from Fulfillingness' First Finale
- 1. "You Haven't Done Nothin'" Released: August 1974; 2. "Boogie On Reggae Woman" Released: November 1974

"Boogie On Reggae Woman"
"Boogie On Reggae Woman" (album version sample)

Fulfillingness' First Finale is the seventeenth studio album by American singer, songwriter, musician, and producer Stevie Wonder, released on July 22, 1974, by Tamla, a subsidiary of Motown Records. It is the fourth of five albums from what is considered Wonder's "classic period".

The album was Wonder's second to top the Billboard Top LPs & Tape chart, where it remained for two weeks, and also reached number one on the Billboard Soul LPs chart, where it spent eight non-consecutive weeks between October 5 and Christmas 1974. At the 17th Annual Grammy Awards, it won in three categories: Album of the Year (Wonder's second consecutive win in this category), Best Male Pop Vocal, and Best Male Rhythm and Blues Vocal Performance (for "Boogie On Reggae Woman") at the ceremony held in 1975. Retrospectively, the album was voted number 413 in the third edition of Colin Larkin's All Time Top 1000 Albums (2000) and included in the book 1001 Albums You Must Hear Before You Die.

Professional ratings
Review scores
Source	Rating
AllMusic	4.5/5 stars
The Austin Chronicle	3.5/5 stars
Christgau's Record Guide	A−
Encyclopedia of Popular Music	5/5 stars
The Great Rock Discography	7/10
Los Angeles Times	4/4 stars
MusicHound Rock	4/5
Q	4/5 stars
The Rolling Stone Album Guide	4/5 stars
The Village Voice	B+

== Recording ==
Following the epic scope and social consciousness themes of Innervisions, Fulfillingness' First Finale, in contrast, projected a more reflective, personal, and somber tone. The musical arrangements used in several songs, especially the bleak "They Won't Go When I Go" and the understated "Creepin'", were sparse compared to those of some of Wonder's other 1970s tracks. Wonder had not completely foregone social commentary, as evidenced by the Billboard Hot 100 number-one single "You Haven't Done Nothin'", which launched a pointed criticism of the Nixon administration bolstered by clavinet, drum machine, and a cameo by the Jackson 5.

== Track listing ==
All songs written by Stevie Wonder, except "They Won't Go When I Go", written by Wonder and Yvonne Wright.

Side one

1. "Smile Please" – 3:26
2. "Heaven Is 10 Zillion Light Years Away" – 5:01
3. "Too Shy to Say" – 3:31
4. "Boogie On Reggae Woman" – 4:54
5. "Creepin'" – 4:17

Side two

1. "You Haven't Done Nothin'" – 3:27
2. "It Ain't No Use" – 3:58
3. "They Won't Go When I Go" – 5:59
4. "Bird of Beauty" – 3:46
5. "Please Don't Go" – 4:06

== Personnel ==
"Smile Please"

- Stevie Wonder – lead vocal, background vocal, Fender Rhodes, drums
- Michael Sembello – electric guitar
- Reggie McBride – electric bass
- Bobbye Hall – congas, bongos
- Jim Gilstrap – background vocals
- Deniece Williams (credited as Denise) – background vocals

"Heaven Is 10 Zillion Years Away"

- Stevie Wonder – lead vocal, background vocal, Hohner clavinet, drums, Moog bass
- Paul Anka – background vocal
- Syreeta Wright – background vocal
- Shirley Brewer – background vocal
- Larry "Nastyee" Latimer – background vocal

"Too Shy to Say"

- Stevie Wonder – lead vocal, piano
- James Jamerson – acoustic bass
- Sneaky Pete Kleinow – pedal steel guitar

"Boogie On Reggae Woman"

- Stevie Wonder – lead vocal, Fender Rhodes, piano, harmonica, drums, Moog bass
- Rocky Dzidzornu – congas

"Creepin'"

- Stevie Wonder – lead vocal, background vocal, Fender Rhodes, harmonica, drums, Moog bass, T.O.N.T.O. synthesizer
- Minnie Riperton – background vocal

"You Haven't Done Nothin"

- Stevie Wonder – lead vocal, Hohner clavinet, bass drum, hi-hat, cymbal
- Reggie McBride – electric bass
- The Jackson 5 – background vocals
- Robert Margouleff and Malcolm Cecil – synthesizers
- Horns, drum machine – uncredited

"It Ain't No Use"

- Stevie Wonder – lead vocal, background vocal, Fender Rhodes, drums, Moog bass
- Lani Groves – background vocal
- Minnie Riperton – background vocal
- Deniece Williams – background vocal

"They Won't Go When I Go"

- Stevie Wonder – lead vocal, background vocal, piano, T.O.N.T.O. synthesizer
- Bob and Malcolm – programming Moog

"Bird of Beauty"

- Stevie Wonder – lead vocal, Fender Rhodes, Hohner clavinet, drums, percussions, Moog bass
- Bobbye Hall – cuíca
- Shirley Brewer – background vocal
- Lani Groves – background vocal
- Deniece Williams – background vocal
- Sérgio Mendes – Portuguese lyrics
- Drum machine – uncredited

"Please Don't Go"

- Stevie Wonder – lead vocal, piano, Fender Rhodes, harmonica, handclaps, drums, hi-hat, Moog bass
- Michael Sembello – acoustic guitar
- The Persuasions – background vocal
- Shirley Brewer – background vocal
- Deniece Williams – background vocal

== Charts ==
=== Weekly charts ===
Year	Chart	Position
1974	Soul Albums	1
1974	Top LP's & Tape	1

=== Singles ===
Year	Single	Billboard Hot 100	Billboard Hot Soul Singles
1974	"You Haven't Done Nothin'"	1	1
1974	"Boogie on Reggae Woman"	3	1

== See also ==
- List of 1970s albums considered the best
- List of number-one albums of 1974 (U.S.)
- List of number-one R&B albums of 1974 (U.S.)
