= They Won't Go When I Go =

1974 song performed by Stevie Wonder

Song by Stevie Wonder

from the album Fulfillingness' First Finale
- Released: July 22, 1974
- Recorded: 1974
- Genre: Soul
- Length: 5:59
- Label: Motown
- Songwriters: Stevie Wonder; Yvonne Wright

"They Won't Go When I Go" is a song co-written and performed by Stevie Wonder from his 1974 album Fulfillingness' First Finale.

This song is the only one on the album that Wonder did not write by himself. His co-writer was Yvonne Wright, who co-wrote songs with Wonder for other albums.

Wonder performed this song, along with "Never Dreamed You'd Leave in Summer", at Michael Jackson's memorial service on July 7, 2009.

In June 2026, CBS News included the song in its list of the 250 essential American songs of the past 250 years.

== Composition ==
The song has been considered a "retro composition", where comparisons of the piano part to the style of Chopin and the Baroque passacaglia or chaconne technique—a repeating bassline in a minor key and in triple metre—can be drawn. The song is also noted to have a "funeral march" like tone. There is clear allusion to the 1850 German chorale tune "O mein Jesu," the setting of Thomas Kelly's 1805 Protestant hymn "Stricken, smitten, and afflicted." Critics noted that the song takes a more dramatic tone than most of Wonder's other compositions. The fact that the song specifically says "They won't go when I go" was said to imply the friends Wonder is talking about may get to heaven eventually, just not before he does. Interpreted more broadly as a hymn, the song is the cry not just of Wonder, but the faithful in general, awaiting a second coming where they are taken and others are not. Many consider this song to be a dark consequence of Wonder's 1973 car accident.

== Cover versions ==
- George Michael covered the song for his second solo album, Listen Without Prejudice Vol. 1, in 1990.
- Josh Groban covered the song on the Japanese bonus track edition of his fifth studio album, Illuminations, in 2010.
- Kanye West opened his set at the Museum of Modern Art's "Party in the Garden" event with a cover of the song on May 10, 2011.
- Camille recorded the song for her second studio album, I Sing Stevie: The Stevie Wonder Songbook, which received an Independent Music Award nomination for Best Tribute Album, in 2014.
- Chance the Rapper did a cover of the song as part of a surprise NPR Tiny Desk Concert in early June 2017.
