= Boogie On Reggae Woman =

1974 single by Stevie Wonder

Single by Stevie Wonder

from the album Fulfillingness' First Finale
- B-side: "Seems So Long"
- Released: November 1974
- Genre: Funk
- Length: 4:55 (album version); 4:05 (1974 single); 5:14 (1999 version)
- Label: Tamla
- Songwriter: Stevie Wonder

Stevie Wonder singles chronology
"You Haven't Done Nothin'" (1974)	"Boogie On Reggae Woman" (1974)	"I Wish" (1976)

Audio video
- "Boogie On Reggae Woman" on YouTube

"Boogie On Reggae Woman" is a 1974 funk song by American Motown artist Stevie Wonder, released as the second single from his seventeenth studio album, Fulfillingness' First Finale, issued that same year. Despite the song's title, its style is firmly funk/R&B and neither boogie nor reggae. It continued Wonder's successful Top Ten streak on the pop charts, reaching number three and also spent two weeks at number one on the soul charts. Billboard ranked it as the No. 26 song for 1975. At the 17th Grammy Awards, Stevie Wonder won the Best R&B Vocal Performance, Male for this song.

The single spent eight weeks on the UK Singles Chart, peaking at No. 12.

It features Wonder's distinctive harmonica, although not his usual chromatic type, but instead a diatonic A-flat "blues harp". The song is also notable for Wonder's pulsating Moog synthesizer bassline. The lyrics are designed as a dialogue between "nice" and "naughty" intent, including the introduction to his harmonica break, which incorporates Wonder's casual but repeated question: "Can I play?"

Following conclusion of the vocal, the harmonica is reprised for the remaining 70 seconds, and concluding 30 bars of the tune, to the fade.

The B-side "Seems So Long" was another song composed by Wonder, which had appeared on his 1972 album Music of My Mind.

== Critical reception ==
Writing for AllMusic, Ed Hogan said: "'Boogie on Reggae Woman' was light and bouncy, strutting along on a funky, percolating pulse. Johnny Nash's 1972 number one pop gold single 'I Can See Clearly Now' had primed the mainstream audience for the reggae sound that Wonder employed on the cut." Billboard said the song has an "irresistible beat", "infectious melody" and "Caribbean flavor". Cash Box said that "a taste of reggae flavoring spices this ditty with Stevie's inimitable vocal style" and "the Wonder man comes across with just the right funk and instrumentation." Record World said that "Stevie brings his 'Fingertips' facile harmonica style back in the spotlight."

== Personnel ==
- Stevie Wonder – lead vocal, Fender Rhodes, piano, harmonica, drums, Moog bass
- Rocky Dzidzornu – congas

== Charts ==
Chart (1974–1975)	Peak position
Canada Top Singles (RPM)	8
Finland (Suomen virallinen lista)	30
US Billboard Hot 100	3
US Hot R&B/Hip-Hop Songs (Billboard)	1
UK Singles (OCC)	12

== See also ==
- List of number-one R&B singles of 1974 (U.S.)
