= Philadelphia Freedom (album) =

1975 album by MFSB

Studio album by MFSB
- Released: November 1975
- Recorded: 1975
- Studio: Sigma Sound, Philadelphia, Pennsylvania
- Genre: Philadelphia soul; disco
- Length: 44:28
- Label: Philadelphia International
- Producer: Kenneth Gamble, Leon Huff, Dexter Wansel, Roland Chambers, Bobby Martin, Jack Faith

MFSB chronology
Universal Love (1975)	Philadelphia Freedom (1975)	Summertime (1976)

Philadelphia Freedom is the fourth album to be released by Philadelphia International Records house-band MFSB. It is also noted as the debut of PIR producer, artist and musician Dexter Wansel. Of the songs on this album, the bassline of the song "Smile Happy" was used in the song "It Wasn't Me" by Shaggy.

Professional ratings
Review scores
Source	Rating
AllMusic	3/5 stars

== Track listing ==
1. "Zach's Fanfare #2" 1:03
2. "Get Down with The Philly Sound" (Roland Chambers) 4:29
3. "Philadelphia Freedom" (Elton John, Bernie Taupin) 6:00
4. "South Philly" (Kenneth Gamble, Leon Huff) 4:28
5. "Ferry Avenue" (Gene McFadden, John Whitehead, Leon Huff, Victor Carstarphen) 4:01
6. "Interlude 1" 0:52
7. "When Your Love Is Gone" (Dexter Wansel) 4:11
8. "Morning Tears" (Dexter Wansel) 5:15
9. "Brothers and Sisters" (Bobby Martin, Kenneth Gamble, Harold Johnson) 3:50
10. "Smile Happy" (War) 5:52
11. "The Zip" (Kenneth Gamble, Leon Huff) 3:51

== Personnel ==
MFSB

- Bobby Eli, Norman Harris, Reggie Lucas, Roland Chambers, T.J. Tindall - guitar
- Anthony Jackson, Ron Baker - bass
- Leon Huff, Lenny Pakula, Eddie Green, Harold "Ivory" Williams - keyboards
- Earl Young, Karl Chambers, Norman Farrington - drums
- Larry Washington - percussion
- Vincent Montana, Jr. - vibraphone
- John E. "Monster" Davis (tenor), Zach Zachery (alto), Tony Williams - saxophone
- Don Renaldo and his Strings and Horns

== Charts ==
Chart (1975)	Peak
U.S. Billboard Top LPs	39
U.S. Billboard Top Soul LPs	14
U.S. Billboard Top Jazz LPs	30

=== Singles ===
Year	Single	Peak chart positions	
Year	Single	US	US R&B
1975	"The Zip"	91	72
