= K-Jee =

Single by the Nite-Liters

from the album Morning, Noon & the Nite-Liters
- Released: 1971
- Recorded: 1971
- Studio: RCA Mid-America Center, Chicago
- Genre: Soul, funk, proto disco
- Label: RCA
- Songwriters: Harvey Fuqua, Charlie Hearndon
- Producer: Harvey Fuqua

"K-Jee" is a 1971 instrumental song by American soul and funk band the Nite-Liters. Written by Harvey Fuqua and Charlie Hearndon, it charted in 1971 at No. 17 on the US Billboard R&B chart. It spent 16 weeks on the US Billboard Hot 100, debuting at number 93 the week of July 3, 1971 and peaking at No. 39 the week of September 11, 1971. The song gained some notoriety again when it was included on the successful Saturday Night Fever soundtrack in 1977, from the eponymous film.

== Charts ==
Year	Single	Chart positions	
Year	Single	US	US R&B
1971	"K-Jee"	39	17

== Personnel ==
- James Baker
- Tony Churchill
- Robert Downs
- Allen Frey
- Charles Hearndon
- Robert Jackson
- Austin Lander
- LeRoy Taylor
- Londee Wiggins

== Cover versions ==
- In 1975, MFSB covered the song on their Universal Love album, charting at No. 18 on the Disco File Top 20 chart. This version was used briefly in the 1977 film Saturday Night Fever and was featured on the accompanying soundtrack.

== Use in other media ==
The instrumental has also appeared as a theme for newscasts presented on KMSP-TV in Minneapolis/St. Paul, Minnesota, WKAB in Montgomery, Alabama, and WMAR-TV in Baltimore, Maryland. It also used for Today In Chicago on WMAQ-TV in Chicago. It was also used by WTVM in Columbus, GA as the opening theme for their Action 9 News broadcast in the late 70s. In the early 80s, the start of the song was used as "bumper" music (going into the commercial break) on WICZ-TV 40 in Binghamton, NY.
