= Summertime (MFSB album) =

Studio album by MFSB
- Released: 1976
- Recorded: 1976
- Studio: Sigma Sound, Philadelphia, Pennsylvania
- Genre: Philadelphia soul; disco
- Length: 34:43
- Label: Philadelphia International
- Producer: Kenneth Gamble, Leon Huff, Gene McFadden, John Whitehead, Victor Carstarphen

MFSB chronology
Philadelphia Freedom (1975)	Summertime (1976)	End of Phase I: A Collection of Greatest Hits (1977)

Summertime is the fifth album to be released by Philadelphia International Records houseband MFSB.

Professional ratings
Review scores
Source	Rating
Allmusic	2/5 stars

== Track listing ==
All tracks composed by Kenneth Gamble and Leon Huff; except where indicated

1. "Picnic in the Park" 4:10
2. "Summertime" (George Gershwin) 4:53
3. "Plenty Good Lovin'" 4:33
4. "Sunnin' and Funnin'" (John Whitehead, Gene McFadden, Victor Carstarphen) 4:14
5. "Summertime and I'm Feelin' Mellow" (John Whitehead, Gene McFadden, Victor Carstarphen) 4:00
6. "I'm on Your Side" 3:30
7. "Hot Summer Nights" 4:25
8. "We Got the Time" (John Whitehead, Gene McFadden, Victor Carstarphen) 4:41

== Personnel ==
MFSB

- Bobby Eli, Norman Harris, Reggie Lucas, Roland Chambers, T.J. Tindall - guitar
- Anthony Jackson, Ron Baker - bass
- Leon Huff, Lenny Pakula, Eddie Green, Harold "Ivory" Williams - keyboards
- Earl Young, Karl Chambers, Norman Farrington - drums
- Larry Washington - percussion
- Vincent Montana, Jr. - vibraphone
- Zach Zachery, Tony Williams - saxophone
- Don Renaldo and his Strings and Horns
- Barbara Ingram, Carla Benson, Evette Benton, Gene McFadden, John Whitehead, Victor Carstarphen - backing vocals

== Charts ==
Year	Album	Chart positions		
Year	Album	US	US R&B	Jazz Albums
1976	Summertime	106	18	21

=== Singles ===
Year	Single	Chart positions	
Year	Single	US R&B	US Dance
1976	"Picnic In The Park"	—	1
1976	"Summertime"	65	1
