= She's a Lady =

Single by Tom Jones

from the album Tom Jones Sings She's a Lady
- B-side: "My Way"
- Released: January 1971
- Recorded: 1970
- Genre: Pop
- Length: 2:53
- Label: Decca (UK), Parrot (US and Canada)
- Songwriter: Paul Anka
- Producer: Gordon Mills

Tom Jones UK singles chronology
"I (Who Have Nothing)" (1970)	"She's a Lady" (1971)	"Puppet Man" (1971)

Audio
- "She's a Lady" by Tom Jones on YouTube

Performance video
- "She's a Lady" by Tom Jones and Paul Anka in The Midnight Special, aired on December 6, 1974 on YouTube

"She's a Lady" is a song written by Paul Anka and released on his album Paul Anka '70s (RCA 4309, 1970). The most successful recording was performed by Tom Jones and released at the beginning of 1971. It is Jones's highest-charting single in the U.S. (and his 5th and final Billboard top 10 hit).

== Chart performance ==
"She's a Lady" hit No. 1 in Cash Box magazine for a week and spent one week at No. 2 on the Billboard Hot 100 chart, behind "Me and Bobby McGee" by Janis Joplin. The song was also a No. 4 hit on the US Billboard Easy Listening chart. Billboard ranked it as the #25 song for 1971. In Canada, the single reached No. 1 on the RPM 100 national singles chart.

== Paul Anka's recording of the song ==
The song was re-released in 2013 on Paul Anka's Duets CD with a new rendition featuring Tom Jones. Anka rewrote the first verse of the song (recorded with Jones) because he disliked its chauvinistic sentiments.

== B-side track ==
The single's B-side track was "My Way" whose lyrics were also written by Paul Anka.

== Chart history ==
=== Weekly charts ===
Chart (1971)	Peak position
Australia (Kent Music Report)	1
Austria (Ö3 Austria Top 40)	12
Belgium (Ultratop 50 Flanders)	3
Belgium (Ultratop 50 Wallonia)	3
Canada Top Singles (RPM)	1
Canada RPM Adult Contemporary	10
Finland (Suomen virallinen lista)	18
Germany (GfK)	7
Ireland (IRMA)	13
Netherlands (Single Top 100)	8
New Zealand (Listener)	7
Norway (VG-lista)	6
South Africa (Springbok)	5
UK Singles (Official Charts)	13
US Billboard Hot 100	2
US Adult Contemporary (Billboard)	4
U.S. Cash Box Top 100	1

=== Year-end charts ===
Chart (1971)	Rank
Australia	22
Canada	25
U.S. Billboard Hot 100	25
U.S. Adult Contemporary (Billboard)	29
U.S. Cash Box	5

== Certifications ==
Region	Certification	Certified units/sales
New Zealand (RMNZ)	Gold	15,000^{‡}
United Kingdom (BPI)	Silver	200,000^{‡}
United States (RIAA)	Gold	1,000,000^{^}
^{^} Shipments figures based on certification alone.^{‡} Sales+streaming figures based on certification alone.
