= Patra (singer) =

Jamaican reggae/dancehall singer (born 1972)

- Born: Dorothy Smith; 22 November 1972 (age 53); Kingston, Jamaica
- Genres: Reggae; dancehall; reggae fusion; dirty rap
- Occupations: Singer; Deejay
- Instrument: Vocals
- Years active: 1991–present
- Label: Epic

Dorothy Smith (born 22 November 1972), better known by her stage name Patra, is a Jamaican reggae/dancehall singer.

== Career ==
In her beginnings as a female dancehall deejay in the late 1980s, she used the stage name Lady Patra. She originally got her name from her cousin who thought of Cleopatra. Patra first made an impression on the US charts as a featured singer on the Shabba Ranks song, "Family Affair", which hit No. 84 on the Billboard Hot 100 in 1994. In 1993, Patra released her debut album Queen of The Pack (No. 1 on the Reggae albums chart). It was led by the single "Think (About It)" in 1993, which peaked at No. 21 on the Billboard Rap Singles chart and No. 89 on R&B. Her follow-up single "Worker Man" became a bigger hit, reaching No. 53 on the Hot 100, the Top 20 on the R&B chart and No. 1 on the U.S. Dance chart. The album's third and final single, "Romantic Call" (No. 55 U.S., No. 21 U.S. Dance), was a collaboration with emcee Yo-Yo.

In 1995, Patra released her single "Pull Up to the Bumper" which was a remake of the Grace Jones song and peaked at No. 60 on the Hot 100, No. 21 R&B, and No. 15 on the Dance chart. Her second album, Scent of Attraction followed later that year, and peaked at No. 151 on the Billboard 200, No. 28 on the R&B/Hip Hop Albums, and No. 2 on the Reggae charts. The set's single, "Scent of Attraction" featuring R&B musician Aaron Hall peaked at No. 82 on the Hot 100, and became her fourth Top 40 (peak: No. 31) R&B hit. "Dip and Fall Back" was also released as a single off the album but failed to chart.

Patra also performed on the 1995 Panther movie soundtrack with the song "Freedom (Theme from Panther)", a collaboration between the American music industry's leading urban female vocalists. She also performed on C+C Music Factory's remix of its hit single "Take a Toke" that same year. After a few years to spend time with family, she released her third studio album The Great Escape in 2003, preceded by the single "Pressure Me." The following year, she appeared on the Two Culture Clash project, where she was featured on the album's lead single, "How Do You Love" featuring fellow reggae artist, Danny English. Her fourth studio album, Where I've Been, was released in 2005, preceded by the single "Man Dem Thriller" and released through the independent record label, Wall Street Entertainment. A follow-up single, "Black Cinderella" was also released.

Soon after, Patra took some time off once again from the music industry, becoming more spiritually connected to God and completing a bachelor's degree in history and political science. In 2012, she signed with Veal-Steen Music. That year, she did a series of shows and interviews, and began work on her fifth studio album with a 12-track set planned with A&R executive/producer, Rich Nice. She released a buzz track "Bad Inna Bed" ahead of the album's first single, "Come Ova" (featuring Delus) which premiered in June 2012. The music video premiered on August 24, 2012, on YouTube. In 2013, she announced a new single off the album "Sweet Reggae Music," which premiered in April. The album Patra: The Continuation was released on February 18, 2014.

In 2024, Patra had a role in the British television series Get Millie Black, which premiered on Channel 4 in the U.K. and on HBO in the U.S.. In the crime drama, Patra portrays a powerful owner of a dance club in Kingston, Jamaica named Hit Girl.

== Personal ==
In April 2005, Patra was arrested for charges of fraud, but was shortly released on bail.

== Discography ==
=== Albums ===
- Queen of the Pack (1993) – US No. 103
- Scent of Attraction (1995) – US No. 151
- The Great Escape (2003)
- Where I've Been (2005) (Unreleased)
- Patra: The Continuation (2014)

=== Singles ===
| Year | Title | Chart positions | | | | | | | Album |
| Year | Title | AUS | NZ | UK | US Billboard Hot 100 | US R&B | US Rap | US Dance | Album |
|---|---|---|---|---|---|---|---|---|---|
| 1993 | "Think (About It)" (featuring Lyn Collins) | – | – | – | – | 89 | 21 | – | Queen of the Pack |
| 1994 | "Worker Man" | – | – | 84 | 53 | 20 | 5 | 1 | Queen of the Pack |
| 1994 | "Romantic Call" (featuring Yo-Yo) | – | – | – | 55 | 35 | 9 | 21 | Queen of the Pack |
| 1995 | "Pull Up to the Bumper" | 78 | 12 | 50 | 60 | 21 | – | 15 | Scent of Attraction |
| 1995 | "Dip and Fall Back" | – | – | – | – | – | – | – | Scent of Attraction |
| 1996 | "Scent of Attraction" (featuring Aaron Hall) | – | – | – | 82 | 31 | – | – | Scent of Attraction |
| 1996 | "Work Mi Body" (Monkey Mafia featuring Patra) | – | – | 75 | – | – | – | – | Non-album single |
| 2003 | "Pressure Me" | – | – | – | – | – | – | – | The Great Escape |
| 2005 | "Man Dem Thriller" | – | – | – | – | – | – | – | Where I've Been |
| 2005 | "Black Cinderella" | – | – | – | – | – | – | – | Where I've Been |
| 2012 | "Come Ova" (featuring Delus) | – | – | – | – | – | – | – | Patra: The Continuation |
| 2013 | "Sweet Reggae Music" | – | – | – | – | – | – | – | Patra: The Continuation |

== See also ==
- List of number-one dance hits (United States)
- List of artists who reached number one on the US Dance chart
