= Put Your Hands Together (The O'Jays song) =

Single by The O'Jays

from the album Ship Ahoy
- B-side: "You Got Your Hooks in Me"
- Released: December 1973
- Recorded: 1973
- Studio: Sigma Sound, Philadelphia, Pennsylvania
- Genre: R&B, Philadelphia soul
- Length: 4:07
- Label: Philadelphia International
- Songwriters: Kenneth Gamble, Leon Huff
- Producers: Kenny Gamble, Leon Huff

The O'Jays singles chronology
"Time to Get Down" (1973)	"Put Your Hands Together" (1973)	"For the Love of Money" (1974)

"Put Your Hands Together" is a song recorded by The O'Jays song in 1973 for their album Ship Ahoy, which peaked at number 10 on the Billboard Hot 100 and number 2 on the Billboard Hot Soul Singles chart. The song reached #47 in Canada. It is their third song to reach the top 10 of the Hot 100 after "Back Stabbers" and "Love Train".
