= List of Billboard Hot 100 number ones of 1971 =

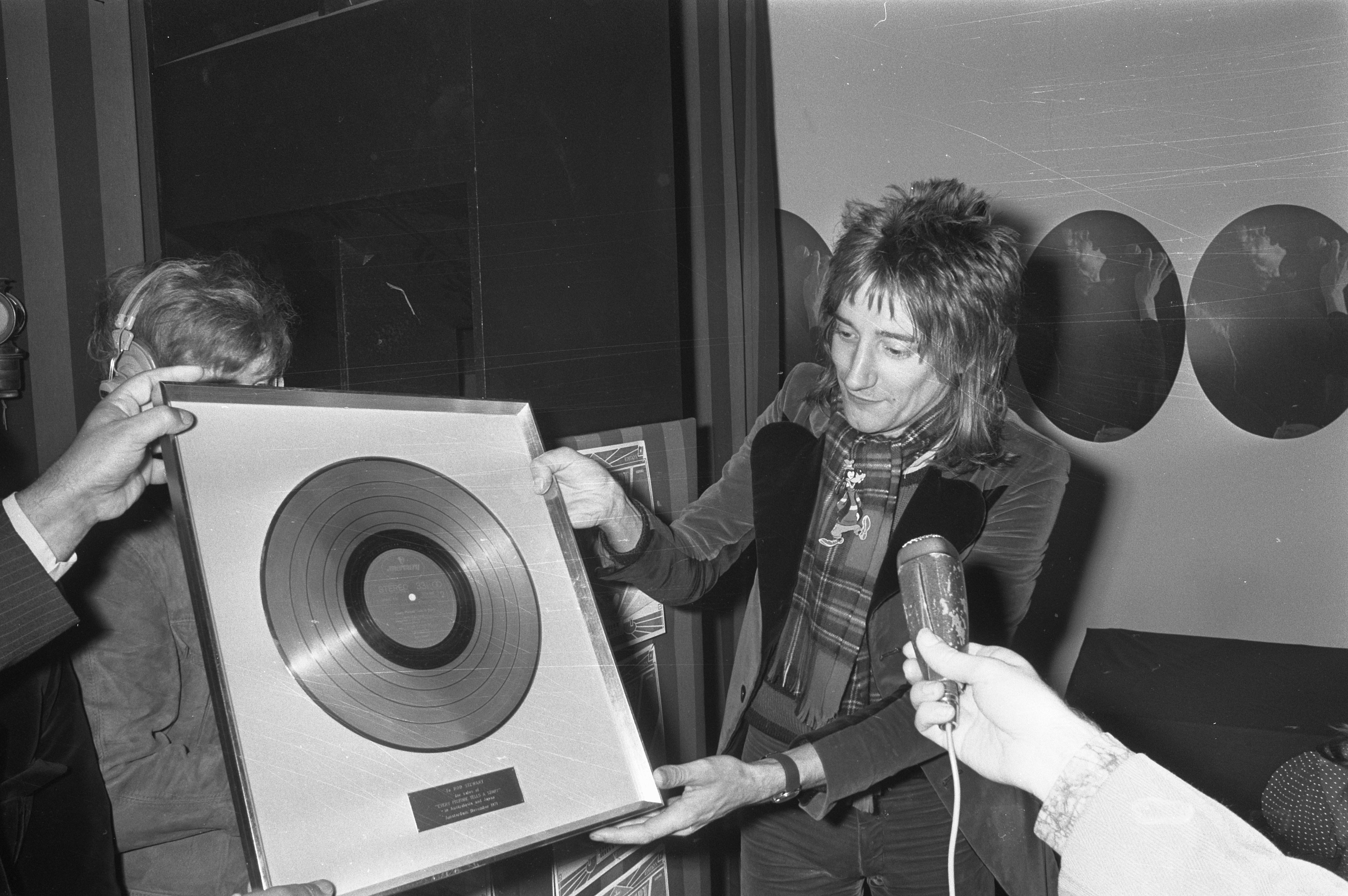
Rod Stewart topped the Hot 100 for the first time in 1971.

The Billboard Hot 100 is a chart published since August 1958 by Billboard magazine which ranks the best-performing singles in the United States. In 1971, it was compiled based on a combination of sales and airplay data sourced from surveys of retail outlets and playlists submitted by radio stations respectively. During the year, 19 different singles spent time at number one.

In the issue of Billboard dated January 2, George Harrison was at number one with the double A-sided single "My Sweet Lord" / "Isn't It a Pity", retaining the position from the final chart of 1970. The single held the top spot for a further two weeks before being displaced by "Knock Three Times", the first number one for the group Dawn. In the issue dated February 13, "One Bad Apple" gave the Osmonds their first chart-topper. The brothers had appeared regularly on the television variety shows The Andy Williams Show and The Jerry Lewis Show during the 1960s, but their recording career did not take off until 1971. Later in the year, 13-year-old Donny Osmond topped the chart as a soloist for the first time with "Go Away Little Girl". The song was the first to be a Hot 100 number one for two different artists; Steve Lawrence had taken the song to the peak position in 1963. In the issue dated March 20, Janis Joplin's "Me and Bobby McGee" was the third consecutive first-time chart-topper. It was a posthumous achievement, as Joplin had died the previous October at the age of 27.

The band Three Dog Night reached number one in April with "Joy to the World"; the track spent six consecutive weeks in the top spot, making it the longest-running chart-topper of 1971. As no act achieved more than one number one during the year, Three Dog Night also had the highest total number of weeks atop the Hot 100 in 1971. Between June and August, Honey Cone, Carole King, the Raiders, James Taylor, and the Bee Gees all reached number one for the first time. King had previously co-written the number ones "Will You Love Me Tomorrow" by the Shirelles, "Take Good Care of My Baby" by Bobby Vee (both 1961), "The Loco-Motion" by Little Eva (1962), and "Go Away Little Girl", but the double A-sided single "It's Too Late" / "I Feel the Earth Move" was her first number one as a performer. Both tracks were taken from King's album Tapestry, which also included another of her self-penned songs, "You've Got a Friend"; two weeks after King's single left the top spot, Taylor reached number one with his version of the latter song, which he had recorded almost simultaneously with King's version. In September, Paul McCartney became the second member of the Beatles (after Harrison) to top the Hot 100 as a soloist when the song "Uncle Albert/Admiral Halsey" spent a single week in the top spot; it was a collaboration with his wife Linda McCartney, giving her her first number one. She later joined her husband in the band Wings, which achieved much chart success, but "Uncle Albert/Admiral Halsey" was the only Hot 100 entry on which she was individually credited. Four weeks later, Rod Stewart, one of the most successful vocalists of all time, gained his first U.S. number one with the double A-side "Maggie May" / "Reason to Believe". Cher, another singer with a long and successful career, achieved her first solo number one with "Gypsys, Tramps & Thieves", six years after she topped the chart as one half of the duo Sonny & Cher. In the last quarter of the year, Isaac Hayes and Melanie both topped the Hot 100 for the first and only time; Melanie's "Brand New Key" was the year's final number one.

== Chart history ==
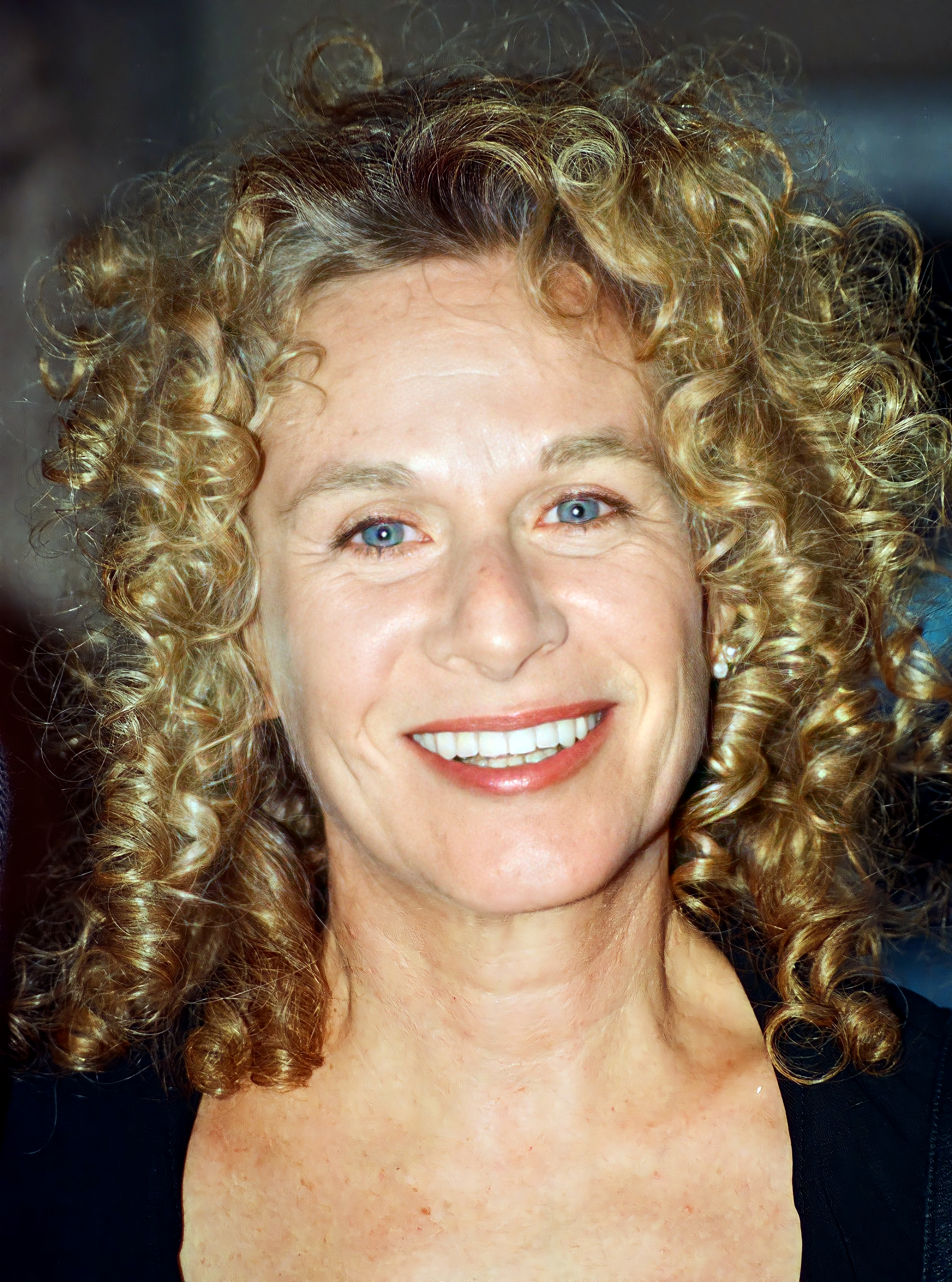
Carole King wrote three songs which topped the chart in June and July.

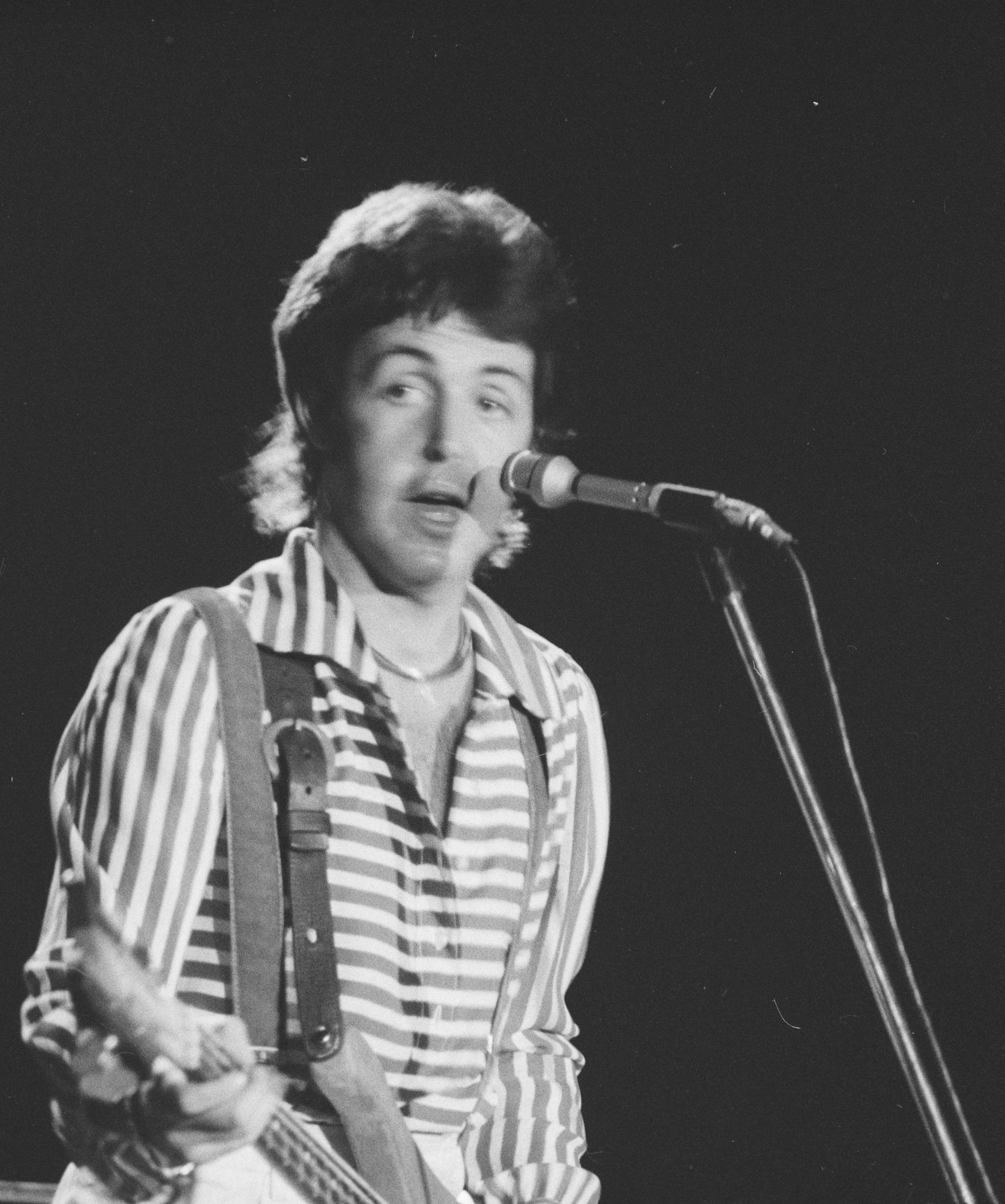
Paul McCartney had his first solo number one in 1971.

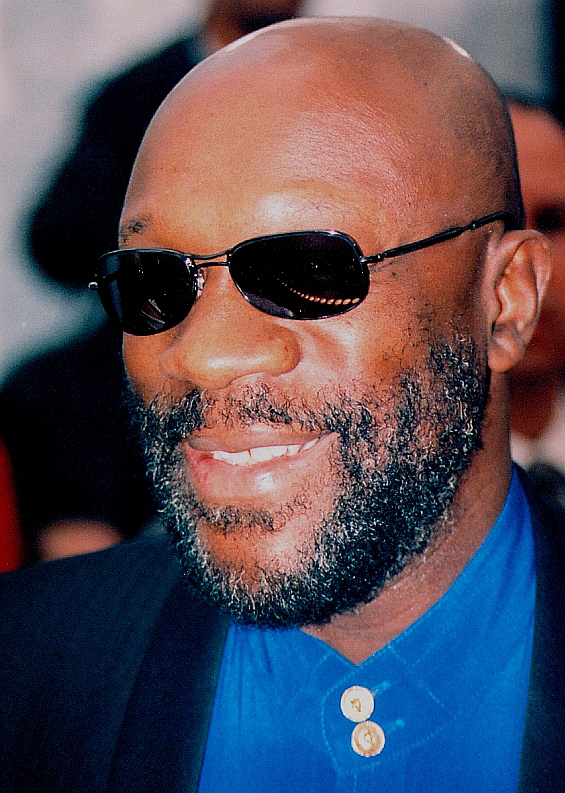
Isaac Hayes topped the chart with "Theme from Shaft".

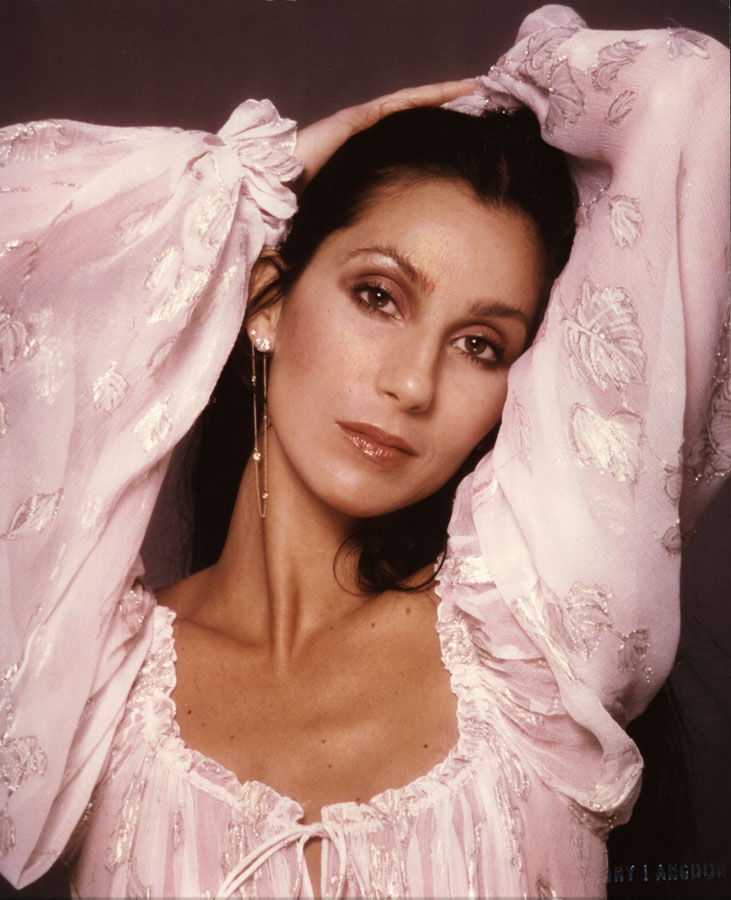
"Gypsys, Tramps & Thieves" was the first solo number one for Cher.

Chart history
No. (Note: The "No." column indicates the numerical sequence of number ones in Hot 100 history.)	Issue date	Title	Artist(s)	Ref.
247	January 2	"My Sweet Lord" / "Isn't It a Pity" (Note: Double A-sided single)	George Harrison	
247	January 9	"My Sweet Lord" / "Isn't It a Pity"	George Harrison	
247	January 16	"My Sweet Lord" / "Isn't It a Pity"	George Harrison	
248	January 23	"Knock Three Times"	Dawn	
248	January 30	"Knock Three Times"	Dawn	
248	February 6	"Knock Three Times"	Dawn	
249	February 13	"One Bad Apple"	The Osmonds	
249	February 20	"One Bad Apple"	The Osmonds	
249	February 27	"One Bad Apple"	The Osmonds	
249	March 6	"One Bad Apple"	The Osmonds	
249	March 13	"One Bad Apple"	The Osmonds	
250	March 20	"Me and Bobby McGee"	Janis Joplin	
250	March 27	"Me and Bobby McGee"	Janis Joplin	
251	April 3	"Just My Imagination (Running Away with Me)"	The Temptations	
251	April 10	"Just My Imagination (Running Away with Me)"	The Temptations	
252	April 17	"Joy to the World"	Three Dog Night	
252	April 24	"Joy to the World"	Three Dog Night	
252	May 1	"Joy to the World"	Three Dog Night	
252	May 8	"Joy to the World"	Three Dog Night	
252	May 15	"Joy to the World"	Three Dog Night	
252	May 22	"Joy to the World"	Three Dog Night	
253	May 29	"Brown Sugar"	The Rolling Stones	
253	June 5	"Brown Sugar"	The Rolling Stones	
254	June 12	"Want Ads"	Honey Cone	
255	June 19	"It's Too Late" / "I Feel the Earth Move"	Carole King	
255	June 26	"It's Too Late" / "I Feel the Earth Move"	Carole King	
255	July 3	"It's Too Late" / "I Feel the Earth Move"	Carole King	
255	July 10	"It's Too Late" / "I Feel the Earth Move"	Carole King	
255	July 17	"It's Too Late" / "I Feel the Earth Move"	Carole King	
256	July 24	"Indian Reservation (The Lament of the Cherokee Reservation Indian)"	The Raiders	
257	July 31	"You've Got a Friend"	James Taylor	
258	August 7	"How Can You Mend a Broken Heart"	Bee Gees	
258	August 14	"How Can You Mend a Broken Heart"	Bee Gees	
258	August 21	"How Can You Mend a Broken Heart"	Bee Gees	
258	August 28	"How Can You Mend a Broken Heart"	Bee Gees	
259	September 4	"Uncle Albert/Admiral Halsey"	Paul & Linda McCartney	
260	September 11	"Go Away Little Girl"	Donny Osmond	
260	September 18	"Go Away Little Girl"	Donny Osmond	
260	September 25	"Go Away Little Girl"	Donny Osmond	
261	October 2	"Maggie May" / "Reason to Believe"	Rod Stewart	
261	October 9	"Maggie May" / "Reason to Believe"	Rod Stewart	
261	October 16	"Maggie May" / "Reason to Believe"	Rod Stewart	
261	October 23	"Maggie May" / "Reason to Believe"	Rod Stewart	
261	October 30	"Maggie May" / "Reason to Believe"	Rod Stewart	
262	November 6	"Gypsys, Tramps & Thieves"	Cher	
262	November 13	"Gypsys, Tramps & Thieves"	Cher	
263	November 20	"Theme from Shaft"	Isaac Hayes	
263	November 27	"Theme from Shaft"	Isaac Hayes	
264	December 4	"Family Affair"	Sly and the Family Stone	
264	December 11	"Family Affair"	Sly and the Family Stone	
264	December 18	"Family Affair"	Sly and the Family Stone	
265	December 25	"Brand New Key"	Melanie	

== Number-one artists ==
List of number-one artists by total weeks at number one
Weeks at No. 1	Artist
6	Three Dog Night
5	The Osmonds
5	Carole King
5	Rod Stewart
4	Bee Gees
3	George Harrison
3	Dawn
3	Donny Osmond
3	Sly and the Family Stone
2	Janis Joplin
2	The Temptations
2	The Rolling Stones
2	Cher
2	Isaac Hayes
1	Honey Cone
1	The Raiders
1	James Taylor
1	Paul McCartney
1	Linda McCartney
1	Melanie

== See also ==
- 1971 in music
- Lists of Billboard number-one singles
- List of Cash Box Top 100 number-one singles of 1971
- List of Billboard Hot 100 number-one singles of the 1970s
