= Love Is the Message (MFSB song) =

Single by MFSB featuring The Three Degrees

from the album Love is the Message
- B-side: "My One and Only Love"
- Released: June 7, 1974
- Recorded: 1973
- Genre: Proto-disco
- Length: 6:37 (album cut); 2:39 (single version); 11:30 (12" version)
- Label: Philadelphia International Records
- Songwriter: Gamble and Huff
- Producers: Kenneth Gamble and Leon Huff

MFSB featuring The Three Degrees singles chronology
"TSOP (The Sound of Philadelphia)" (1974)	"Love Is the Message" (1974)	"Sexy" (1975)

"Love Is the Message" is a song by MFSB featuring vocals by The Three Degrees. Written by Gamble and Huff, the song is the title track of their 1973 album and the follow-up sngle to their No. 1 hit TSOP (The Sound of Philadelphia). It reached No. 85 on the Billboard Hot 100 in 1974.

== Weekly charts ==
Chart (1973–74)	Peak position
Canada Top Singles (RPM)	37
US Billboard Hot 100	85
US Hot R&B/Hip-Hop Songs (Billboard)	42
