= Family Affair (Sly and the Family Stone song) =

1971 single by Sly and the Family Stone

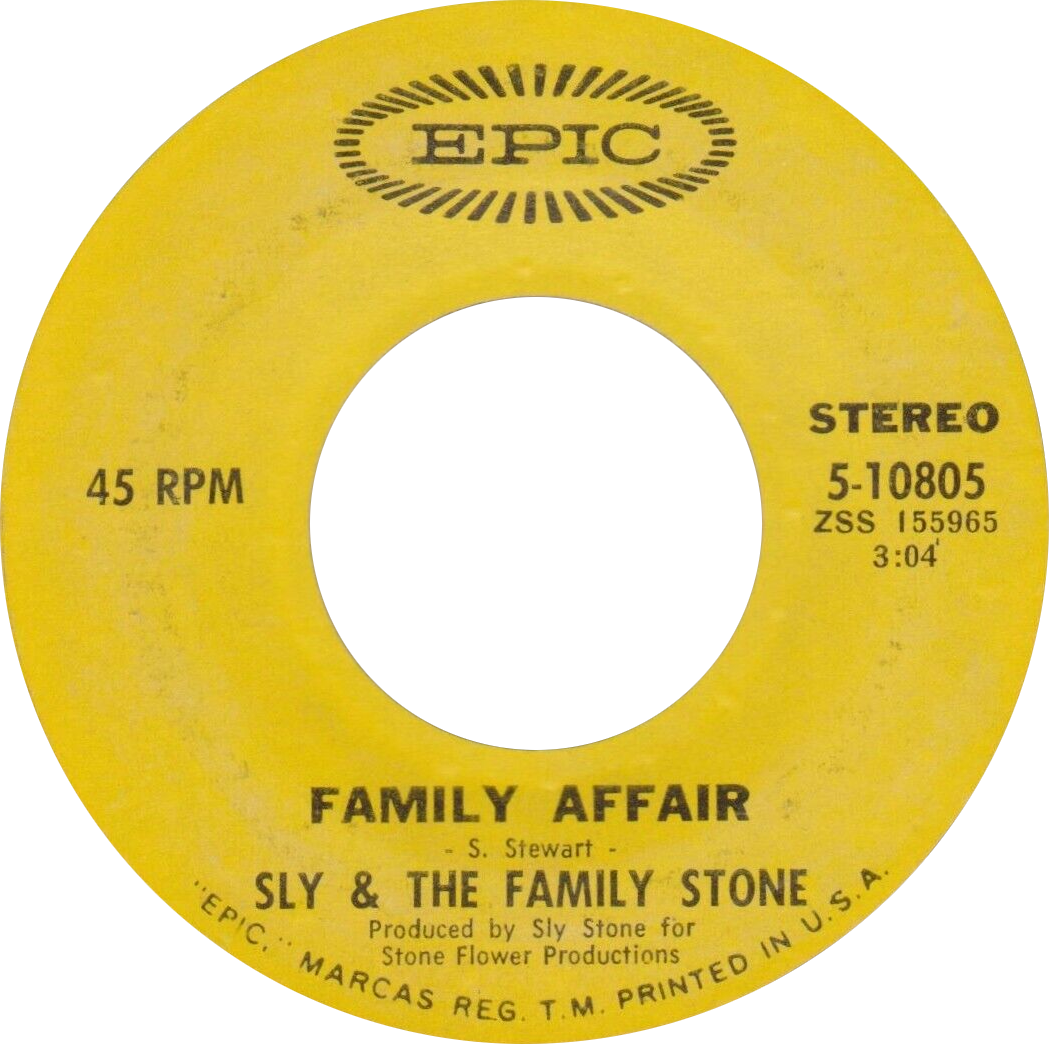
- One of side-A labels of the US single

Single by Sly and the Family Stone

from the album There's a Riot Goin' On
- B-side: "Luv N' Haight"
- Released: November 6, 1971
- Recorded: 1971
- Genre: Funk; psychedelic soul; R&B
- Length: 3:05
- Label: Epic; 5-10805
- Songwriter: Sly Stone
- Producer: Sly Stone

Sly and the Family Stone singles chronology
"Thank You (Falettinme Be Mice Elf Agin)" / "Everybody Is a Star" (1969)	"Family Affair" (1971)	"Runnin' Away" (1972)

Music video
- "Family Affair" (audio) on YouTube

"Family Affair" is a 1971 number-one hit single recorded by American funk band Sly and the Family Stone for the Epic Records label. Their first new material since the double A-sided single "Thank You (Falettinme Be Mice Elf Agin)"/ "Everybody Is a Star" nearly two years prior, "Family Affair" became the third and final number-one pop single for the band. In 2021, Rolling Stone magazine ranked the song 57th on their list of the 500 Greatest Songs of All Time. The cover version by John Legend, Joss Stone, and Van Hunt, won the Grammy Award for Best R&B Performance by a Duo or Group with Vocals at 49th Annual Grammy Awards.

== Overview ==
Released on November 6, 1971, "Family Affair" was markedly different from the earlier Sly & the Family Stone hits. Songwriter Sly Stone stated in his autobiography Thank You (Falettinme Be Mice Elf Agin): A Memoir that the lyrics were inspired not so much by his own family but by future wife Kathy Silva and her sister. Engineering consultant Richard Tilles muted most of Sly Stone's guitar parts while emphasizing the Hohner Pianet electric piano played by Billy Preston and "edit[ing] the rhythm box to sound like a heartbeat," according to David Hepworth. Family Affair was written in the key of D minor.

"Family Affair" was the most successful hit of Sly & the Family Stone's career, peaking at number-one on the Billboard Hot 100 for three weeks, while achieving the same on the Billboard R&B Singles chart for five weeks. Billboard ranked it as the No. 79 song for 1972.

Around 2022, a longer version of "Family Affair" emerged which included musical content from the original session that was not heard on the original release. It appears to be what was heard on the Multitrack Playback: Family Affair clip that featured the original members years later listening to their work in a studio.

== Charts ==
=== Weekly charts ===
Chart (1971–1972)	Peak position
Australia (Kent Music Report)	46
Canada Top Singles (RPM)	1
New Zealand (Listener)	11
UK Singles (OCC)	15
US Billboard Hot 100	1
US Hot R&B (Billboard)	1
US Cash Box Top 100	1

=== Year-end charts ===
Chart (1971)	Rank
Canada Top Singles (RPM)	16
US (Joel Whitburn's Pop Annual)	9

Chart (1972)	Rank
US Billboard Hot 100	79
US Hot R&B (Billboard)	28
US Cash Box Top 100	11

== Certifications ==
Region	Certification	Certified units/sales
United States (RIAA)	Platinum	1,000,000^{‡}
^{‡} Sales+streaming figures based on certification alone.

== Personnel ==
- Sly Stone — vocals, bass guitar, electric guitar, drums and rhythm machine pre-set
- Rose Stone — vocals
- Billy Preston — Hohner Pianet
- Bobby Womack — rhythm guitar

== Notable covers and derivative recordings ==
"Family Affair" has been heavily covered, with versions by Tyrone Davis, The Brothers Johnson, MFSB, Iggy Pop, Bunny Wailer, Andrew Roachford, and many more. The song's drum machine-created rhythm was duplicated in several early to mid-1970s recordings, in particular The Temptations' "Let Your Hair Down" (1973), and Stevie Wonder's "You Haven't Done Nothin'" (1974).

Chuck Brown & the Soul Searchers performed a Go-go rendition for the album Go Go Swing Live (1986).

Madonna featured this song as an intro to "Keep It Together" on her Blond Ambition Tour in 1990. Australian singer Stephen Cummings released a version as the second single from his fifth studio album, Good Humour. A rap-infused, danceable cover was released by German Milli Vanilli spinoff band Try 'N' B in 1992. Prince sampled the song on his track "Y Should Eye Do That When Eye Can Do This?".

=== MFSB version ===
"Family Affair"

Single by MFSB

from the album MFSB
- Released: 1973
- Recorded: 1972
- Genre: Philadelphia soul; jazz; soul jazz
- Length: 2:15
- Label: Philadelphia International
- Songwriter: Sly Stone
- Producer: Kenneth Gamble and Leon Huff

Official audio
- "Family Affair" on YouTube

MFSB recorded an instrumental version of "Family Affair" as their debut single, from their 1973 debut album MFSB.

==== Track listings ====
- 7" single
1. "Family Affair" 2:17
2. "Lay In Low" 3:46

=== Shabba Ranks version ===
"Family Affair"

Single by Shabba Ranks featuring Patra and Terri & Monica

from the album Addams Family Values
- Released: December 24, 1993
- Recorded: 1992
- Genre: Reggae fusion; dancehall
- Length: 4:02
- Label: Epic
- Songwriter: Sly Stone
- Producer: Salaam Remi

Shabba Ranks featuring Patra and Terri & Monica singles chronology
"What'cha Gonna Do" (1993)	"Family Affair" (1993)	"Let's Get It On" (1995)

Official audio
- "Family Affair" on YouTube

In 1993, Jamaican dancehall musician Shabba Ranks featuring Patra and Terri & Monica released a cover of "Family Affair" as a single for the Addams Family Values soundtrack. This version charted on the US Billboard pop chart at number 84, number 16 on the Billboard R&B chart, and number-six on the Billboard Hot Rap Tracks chart. Compared to the original, this version also includes rap passages. In the music video, Shabba Ranks performs the song in different scenes.

==== Track listings ====
- Maxi-CD
1. "Family Affair" (Album Version) 4:00
2. "Family Affair" (Extended Affair) 5:16
3. "Family Affair" (Dead Man's Graveyard Mix) 5:10
4. "Family Affair" (Old School Retro Mix) 4:29

==== Charts ====
Chart (1993–1994)	Peak position
Canada Retail Singles (The Record)	9
Europe (European Dance Radio)	8
UK Airplay (Music Week)	35
UK Club Chart (Music Week)	32
US Billboard Hot 100	84
US Hot R&B/Hip-Hop Singles & Tracks (Billboard)	16
US Hot Rap Tracks (Billboard)	6
US Hot Dance Music/Maxi-Singles Sales (Billboard)	11

== See also ==
- List of Billboard Hot 100 number ones of 1971
- List of Best Selling Soul Singles number ones of 1971
- List of Best Selling Soul Singles number ones of 1972
