= TSOP (The Sound of Philadelphia) =

Single by MFSB featuring The Three Degrees

from the album Love is the Message
- B-side: "Something for Nothing"
- Released: February 6, 1974 (U.S.); March 29, 1974 (UK)
- Recorded: 1973
- Studio: Sigma Sound, Philadelphia, Pennsylvania
- Genre: Philadelphia soul; disco
- Length: 3:43 (album cut); 3:29 (single version); 5:48 (12" version)
- Label: Philadelphia International Records
- Songwriter: Gamble and Huff
- Producers: Kenneth Gamble and Leon Huff

MFSB featuring The Three Degrees singles chronology
"Family Affair" (1973)	"TSOP (The Sound of Philadelphia)" (1974)	"Love Is the Message" (1974)

"TSOP (The Sound of Philadelphia)" is a 1974 recording by MFSB featuring vocals by The Three Degrees. It was written by Gamble and Huff as the theme for the American musical television program Soul Train, which specialized in African American musical performers. The single was released on the Philadelphia International Records label. It was the first television theme song to reach No. 1 on the Billboard Hot 100.

At the 17th Annual Grammy Awards in 1975, the song won the Grammy for Best R&B Instrumental Performance.

== Background ==
The song is an instrumental, featuring a blend of string instruments and a horn section. There are two vocal parts: a passage where The Three Degrees sing "People all over the world" and "Let's get it on. It's time to get down". The words "People all over the world" are not heard in the original version. The version heard on Soul Train, released on a 1975 Three Degrees album, International, had the series title sung over the first four notes of the melody, "Soul Train, Soul Train".

"TSOP" hit No. 1 on the U.S. Billboard Hot 100 in 1974 and remained there for two weeks, the first television theme song to do so.

Don Cornelius, the creator and host of Soul Train, refused to allow any references to the name of the television series when the single was released, leading Gamble and Huff to adopt the alternate title for the release.

Although it was rerecorded for future versions of the show and different themes were used during the 1970s and 1980s, "TSOP" returned in the 1980s and remained the theme song for Soul Train.

== Covers and samples ==
"TSOP" was covered by Dexys Midnight Runners and released as a B-side on the 12" version of the "Jackie Wilson Said" single, and was issued on the remastered version of the album Too-Rye-Ay.

In 1978, the song was covered by reggae band Inner Circle.

George Duke covered the song in 1986 and Sampson covered it in 1999.

In 1998, German act BMR featuring Dutch singer Felicia Uwaje sampled the single in their song Check It Out.

A similar melody is used in the anime series Haré+Guu.

== Uses of the song ==
The song is played at Citizens Bank Park in Philadelphia prior to every Philadelphia Phillies home game. It was played after Vancouver Whitecaps (1974–1984) NASL home games at Empire Stadium in the 1970s and 1980s, and after Vancouver Whitecaps (1986–2010) CSL home games in the 1980s and 1990s.

Game Ka Na Ba?, a Philippines game show hosted by actor/politician Edu Manzano, used an adaptation of "TSOP" called "Papayo Yowza" as its theme. The opening was sampled as program identification for Philadelphia 76ers games broadcast on WPHT in the 1970s and during timeouts and before commercial breaks for NBA on CBS games in the 1975 NBA playoffs until the 1976 NBA Finals.

== Charts ==
=== Weekly charts ===
Chart (1973–1974)	Peak position
Australia (Kent Music Report)	12
Austria (Ö3 Austria Top 40)	17
Belgium (Ultratop 50 Wallonia)	19
Canada Adult Contemporary (RPM)	24
Canada Top Singles (RPM)	1
Netherlands (Dutch Top 40)	20
Netherlands (Single Top 100)	18
New Zealand (Listener)	13
South Africa (Springbok)	13
Spain (AFE)	1
Switzerland (Schweizer Hitparade)	3
UK Singles (Official Charts)	22
US Billboard Hot 100	1
US Easy Listening (Billboard)	1
US Hot Soul Singles (Billboard)	1
US Cash Box Top 100	1
West Germany (GfK)	5

=== Year-end charts ===
Chart (1974)	Rank
Australia (Kent Music Report)	90
Canada	14
US Billboard Hot 100	7
US Cash Box Top 100	17

== Certifications ==
Region	Certification	Certified units/sales
United States (RIAA)	Gold	1,000,000^{^}
^{^} Shipments figures based on certification alone.
