= Theme from Shaft =

1971 song by Isaac Hayes

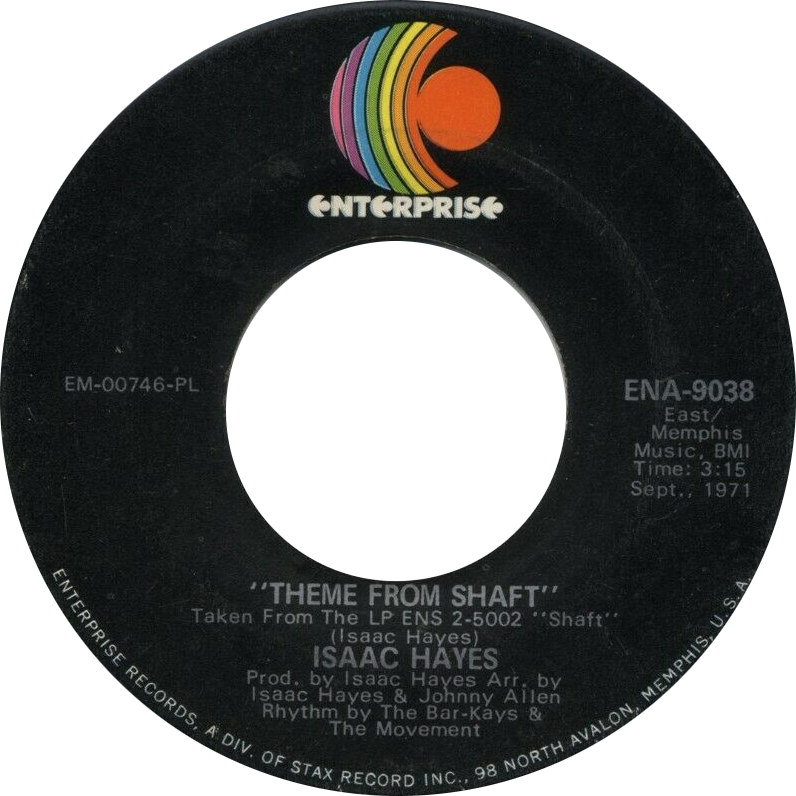
- One of side-A labels of the US single

Single by Isaac Hayes

from the album Shaft
- B-side: "Cafe Regio's"
- Released: September 30, 1971
- Recorded: 1971
- Studio: Stax Recording Studios, Memphis, Tennessee
- Genre: Soul; funk; proto-disco
- Length: 3:15 (single edit); 4:34 (album version)
- Label: Enterprise; ENA-9038
- Songwriter: Isaac Hayes
- Producer: Isaac Hayes

Isaac Hayes singles chronology
"Never Can Say Goodbye" / "I Can't Help It" (1971)	"Theme from Shaft" (1971)	"Do Your Thing" / "Ellie's Love Theme" (1972)

Lyric video
- Isaac Hayes – "Theme from Shaft" (single version) on YouTube

"Theme from Shaft", written and recorded by Isaac Hayes in 1971, is the soul and funk-styled theme song to the Metro-Goldwyn-Mayer film Shaft. The theme was released as a single (shortened and edited from the longer album version) two months after the movie's soundtrack by Stax Records' Enterprise label. "Theme from Shaft" went to no. 2 on the Billboard Soul Singles chart (behind "Inner City Blues (Make Me Wanna Holler)" by Marvin Gaye) and to number one on the Billboard Hot 100 in the United States in November 1971, and no. 1 in Canada in December. The song was also well received by adult audiences, reaching number six on Billboard's Easy Listening chart and no. 4 in Canada. The song is considered by some to be one of the first disco singles.

The following year, "Theme from Shaft" won the Academy Award for Best Original Song, with Hayes becoming the first African American to win that honor – or any Academy Award in a non-acting category – as well as the first recipient of the award who both wrote and performed the winning song. Since then, the song has appeared in numerous television shows, commercials, and other movies, including the 2000 sequel Shaft, for which Hayes re-recorded the song. In 2004, the original finished at number 38 in AFI's 100 Years...100 Songs survey of top songs in American cinema.

In 1972, at the 14th Annual Grammy Awards, Isaac Hayes won two Grammys, one for Best Instrumental Arrangement for "Theme from Shaft" and one for Best Original Score Written for a Motion Picture or a Television Special for Shaft.

In 1999, the 1971 recording was inducted into the Grammy Hall of Fame.

In 2014, the song, as part of the album which it was released on was added to the National Recording Registry by the Library of Congress for being "culturally, historically, or aesthetically significant."

== Composition and history ==
In 2000, Hayes told National Public Radio that he had only agreed to write and record the Shaft score after the film's producer, Joel Freeman, promised him an audition for the lead role, which was taken by a then-unknown Richard Roundtree. Hayes, who also had no acting experience, never got the chance to audition, but kept his end of the deal anyway. Director Gordon Parks also had a hand in composing the theme, describing the character of John Shaft (the "black private dick/who's a sex machine/to all the chicks") to Hayes and explaining that the song had to familiarize the audience with him. Hayes recorded the rhythm parts on the theme first, scored the entire rest of the film, then returned to the theme song.

Hayes told Mojo in 1995:

"As this was my first such undertaking, at the initial meeting I had with the producer and director in New York you could see the anxiety on their faces. They tested me by giving me the opening scene – footage of Shaft coming out of the subway – to take away and see how I got on. I remembered a guitar line I had in a tune I'd never used, got it off the shelf and had our guitarist play it exactly the same, but with a wah-wah. Then I got our drummer to play 16-note sequences on the hi-hat and we had it. The core rhythm for the tune, the springboard for the whole soundtrack, we'd cut in under two hours."

The opening sixteenth-note hi-hat ride pattern, played by Willie Hall, was drawn from a break on Otis Redding's "Try a Little Tenderness", a Stax record on which Hayes had played. Guitarist Charles Pitts' wah-wah effect was common in 1970s funk; the riff had originally been written for an unfinished Stax song. The synthesized keyboard is played by Hayes. Even on the edited single version, the intro lasts for more than one and a half minutes before any vocals are heard. The arrangement was by Hayes and Johnny Allen.

Theme from Shaft
Single version of "Theme from Shaft", performed by Isaac Hayes.

The lyrics describe John Shaft's coolness, courage and sex appeal and Hayes' lead vocals are punctuated by a trio of female backup singers. At one famous moment, Hayes calls Shaft "a bad mother—;" before the backup singers (one of whom is Tony Orlando and Dawn's Telma Hopkins) interrupt the implied profanity with the line "Shut yo' mouth!" Hayes immediately defends himself by replying "I'm talking about Shaft", with the back-up vocalists replying, "We can dig it." Other well-known passages include "You're damn right!" also uttered by Hayes, and "He's a complicated man/but no one understands him/but his woman/John Shaft."

The song was considered very racy for its time. As late as 1990, censors at the Fox Network thought it too risqué to be sung on The Simpsons (until it was pointed out that the song had been played on television before).

The song was not intended to be a single, but the success of the film and the popularity of the track in nightclubs led to a 45 record of the theme being released on Enterprise Records two months after the soundtrack. Within two months, it hit No. 1 on the Billboard Hot 100 and stayed there a second week. It peaked at No. 4 in the UK Singles Chart. The song had an enormous influence on the disco and soul music of the decade.

In 1972, Hayes performed "Theme from Shaft" as part of the Academy Awards ceremony in his signature chain mail vest, but accepted the Academy Award for Best Original Song later that night wearing a tuxedo. He dedicated his historic win to his grandmother, Rushia Wade, who joined him onstage as he accepted the award. Following the Academy Awards, Hayes, the Rev. Jesse Jackson and the Stax staff dedicated the win to the black community at an Operation PUSH rally. "When it hit so big I was in severe disbelief ..." he later reflected. "Then when it won an Academy Award — it won Best Song, but the album was also nominated for Best Soundtrack — I was in a state of shock. This was after the Academy tried to disqualify it, too, saying, because I can't write music, it wasn't my composition. Quincy Jones got in there and argued my case; saying that, even if I didn't physically write it down, they were my ideas."

Later that year, Hayes performed "Theme from Shaft" live at the Wattstax concert in Los Angeles. Film footage of this performance was recorded for Mel Stuart's documentary film of the concert, but was cut before the film's release due to legal complications with MGM, who would not allow Hayes to perform his Shaft songs in any other film until 1976. A 2003 remastered version of the Wattstax film reinstates Hayes' performance of "Theme from Shaft".

When John Singleton directed an updated version of Shaft in 2000, starring Samuel L. Jackson, Hayes re-recorded the theme for the new film.

== Personnel ==
- Isaac Hayes – lead vocals, keyboards, lyrics, arrangements
- Pat Lewis – backing vocals
- Rose Williams – backing vocals
- Mitchell Butler – backing vocals
- Telma Hopkins – backing vocals
- Lester Snell – electric piano
- David Becker – viola
- Charles Pitts – guitar
- Michael Toles – guitar
- Marc "Dr. Love" Davis – guitar solo
- James Alexander – bass guitar
- Richard "Johnny" Davis – trumpet
- John Fonville – flute
- Gary Jones – congas
- Willie Hall – drums

== Cover versions ==
A version by Eddy and the Soul Band was a No. 13 hit in the UK Singles Chart in 1985.

== See also ==
- List of Billboard Hot 100 number-one singles of 1971
