= You Haven't Done Nothin' =

1974 single by Stevie Wonder

- Front cover (Netherlands issue)

Single by Stevie Wonder

from the album Fulfillingness' First Finale
- B-side: "Big Brother"
- Released: August 7, 1974
- Genre: Funk rock
- Length: 3:29
- Label: Tamla Motown
- Songwriter: Stevie Wonder

Stevie Wonder singles chronology
"He's Misstra Know-It-All" (1974)	"You Haven't Done Nothin'" (1974)	"Boogie On Reggae Woman" (1974)

Audio video
- "You Haven't Done Nothin'" on YouTube

"You Haven't Done Nothin'" is a 1974 funk single by Stevie Wonder, taken from his album Fulfillingness' First Finale and featuring background vocals by the Jackson 5. The politically aware song became Wonder's fourth number 1 pop hit and his tenth number 1 soul hit. It also reached Number 1 in Canada. In the UK the single spent five weeks on the chart, peaking at Number 30.

== Background ==
The song criticizes political leaders for making promises of change without delivering meaningful results, expressing frustration with political dishonesty and the public's lack of influence over government decisions. Although the song was widely understood as a criticism of President Richard Nixon, Wonder later explained that it addressed the broader political climate, including unfulfilled campaign promises and the Vietnam War. The single was released on August 7, 1974, one day before Nixon announced his resignation, which took effect on August 9.

Billboard described "You Haven't Done Nothin'" as being "exceptionally powerful" and more subtle than most protest songs, particularly praising the synthesizer arrangement and the vocal performance. Cashbox magazine called it a "super track filled with the memories of the great 'Superstition' a while back" and said that "musically, horns, keyboards, bass and guitar highlight and vocally, aside from Stevie's magic, the Jackson 5 is right in there on 'doo wops.'" Record World called it "a message song to end them all" in which Wonder "deals directly with those who'd only promise their way to a better world."

== Personnel ==
- Stevie Wonder – lead vocal, Hohner clavinet, bass drum, hi-hat, cymbal
- Reggie McBride – electric bass
- The Jackson 5 – background vocals
- Robert Margouleff and Malcolm Cecil – synthesizers
- Uncredited – Horns, drum machine

== Covers ==
- Roger Daltrey covered the song on his 2018 album As Long as I Have You.
- Billy Valentine covered the song on his 2023 album Billy Valentine & The Universal Truth.
