= MFSB =

American collective of session musicians

- Origin: Philadelphia, Pennsylvania, U.S.
- Genres: R&B; soul; Philadelphia soul; disco; funk
- Years active: 1971–1985
- Label: Philadelphia International
- Past members: Bob Babbitt; Ronnie Baker; Thom Bell; Keith Benson; Karl Chambers; Roland Chambers; Charles Collins; Bobby Eli; John E. Davis; John H. Davis; Norman Farrington; Michael Foreman; Eddie Green; Dennis Harris; Norman Harris; Leon Huff; Anthony Jackson; Frederick Joiner; Quinton Joseph; Ron Kersey; Reggie Lucas; Vincent Montana Jr. Lenny Pakula; Don Renaldo; T. J. Tindall; Dexter Wansel; Larry Washington; Winnie Wilford; Harold Ivory Williams Jr. Jimmie Williams; Earl Young; Leon "Zach" Zachery

MFSB, officially standing for "Mother Father Sister Brother", was a pool of more than 30 studio musicians based at Philadelphia's Sigma Sound Studios. They worked closely with the production team of Gamble and Huff and producer/arranger Thom Bell, and backed up Harold Melvin & the Blue Notes, the O'Jays, the Stylistics, the Spinners, Wilson Pickett, and Billy Paul.

In 1972, MFSB began recording as a named act for the Philadelphia International label. "TSOP (The Sound of Philadelphia)", also known as the Soul Train theme, was their second and most successful single. Released in March 1974, it peaked at number one on the US Billboard pop and R&B charts. "TSOP" was influential in establishing the disco sound. The track sold over one million copies, and was awarded a gold disc by the RIAA in April 1974.

== Overview ==
MFSB formed in 1971 and disbanded in 1985, three years after Teddy Pendergrass' car accident, which left him paralyzed.

Assembled by record producers Kenneth Gamble and Leon Huff, MFSB was the house band for their Philadelphia International Records label and originated the "Philly sound" that dominated the early 1970s for the artists who recorded at the Sigma Sound Studios, including The O'Jays, The Spinners, Harold Melvin & the Bluenotes, the Intruders, the Three Degrees, Jerry Butler, and Teddy Pendergrass. Later in the decade, the collective would become known for the hi-hat-dominated disco sounds that became popular in the late 1970s with groups such as the Trammps, First Choice, Ripple and Double Exposure.

It was the 1973 release of their first album, MFSB, that put them on the map. This marked the beginning of a string of instrumental hits that brought major attention to a large orchestra who laid the foundation for the Sound of Philadelphia. The line-up of musicians included Karl Chambers, Earl Young, and Norman Fearrington on drums; Norman Harris, Roland Chambers, Bobby Eli, and T. J. Tindall on guitar; Winnie Wilford and Ronnie Baker on bass; Vincent Montana Jr. on vibes, timpani, orchestra bells, chimes, percussion, arrangements and conductor, and Larry Washington on congas and bongos, Harold Ivory Williams Jr. Jr. on keyboards, plus Leon Huff and Thom Bell on keyboards and Don Renaldo on strings and horns featuring Rocco Bene on trumpet.

MFSB's disco sound first hit the top of the Billboard Hot 100 charts as the backing band for the O'Jays' "Love Train" in March 1973.

In 2005, drummer Keith Benson (who along with Charles Collins and Quinton Joseph, had joined the group in 1975 upon Earl Young's departure) revived the group with Kenny Gamble and Leon Huff’s help. The lineup included himself on drums, Jimmy Williams and Stacey McGee on bass, Dennis Harris and Barton French on guitars, Carla Benson and Michael Clark on vocals.

== Career ==
In the spring of 1974, Philadelphia International released an instrumental track which had been recorded by the band as the theme music for the television show Soul Train as a single. The record, titled "TSOP (The Sound of Philadelphia)", reached number one on the US Billboard Hot 100 and also topped the R&B chart and the adult contemporary chart. The success of "TSOP" launched a recording career for the band under their own name. MFSB albums and singles were released for the rest of the decade.

MFSB recorded a cover of the Nite-Liters's 1971 instrumental "K-Jee", which gained some popularity later when it was featured in a key scene in the film Saturday Night Fever (1977). It is also included in the soundtrack to that movie. "Sexy" (1975) was later used as a prize cue for the "Big Deal of the Day" on the 1980 version of Let's Make a Deal.

Another popular MFSB number, "Love Is the Message", has been a favorite of dance/disco DJs since its release; countless remixes, both official and unofficial, exist of the song. On September 20, 2004, the record became among the first to be inducted into the newly formed Dance Music Hall of Fame. In October 2004, the song appeared in the video game Grand Theft Auto: San Andreas, playing on funk radio station, Bounce FM. An episode of the television series Pose named after the song aired on July 18, 2018, and the song appeared prominently in the episode.

Due to a disagreement with Gamble & Huff over finances, several members of the group moved on to Salsoul Records, where they became known as the Salsoul Orchestra. Other members began performing as the Ritchie Family orchestra, and John Davis and the Monster Orchestra. Not to be outdone, Gamble & Huff replaced them with a new rhythm section consisting of Charles Collins on drums, Michael Foreman on bass guitar, and Dennis Harris on lead guitar. They also employed Dexter Wansel and others on MFSB's latter recordings for the label.

For decades, MFSB's "My Mood" has been the closing theme music for the Friday 6 p.m. news on WRC-TV, NBC's owned-and-operated television station in Washington, D.C. Longtime WRC-TV anchor Jim Vance said the theme was chosen to help soothe viewers after a week of particularly difficult news but also gave the station a chance to acknowledge the staff responsible for gathering it. MFSB's "TLC" (Tender Lovin' Care) was used for decades as the closing credits theme for the Washington, DC, version of the It's Academic quiz show recorded at WRC-TV.

In 2008, some of the members appeared together on new recordings made at Bobby Eli’s Studio E/The Grooveyard in the Philly suburbs. Musicians on the session were Earl Young on drums, Bobby Eli and Dennis Harris on guitars, Jimmie Williams on bass guitar, Rikki Hicks on percussion and T G Conway on keys. Two songs have been released from that session: "Soul Recession" by Double Exposure and "There I go falling in love again" by Chiquita Green.

== Name origin ==
According to the book A House on Fire: The Rise and Fall of Philadelphia Soul, by John A. Jackson, the "clean" version of the MFSB name means "Mother, Father, Sister, Brother", because according to Kenny Gamble and Leon Huff, despite the diversity at Philadelphia International Records, all were connected musically. This was in line with their spiritual views at the time. The "other" version was "motherfuckin' son-of-a-bitch", an expression that was used among the musicians to compliment a person's musical prowess.

== Discography ==
=== Studio albums ===
Year	Album	Peak chart positions					Certifications	Record label
Year	Album	US	US R&B	US Jazz	AUS	CAN	Certifications	Record label
1973	MFSB	131	20	—	—	—		Philadelphia International
1973	Love Is the Message	4	1	4	55	6	US: Gold	Philadelphia International
1975	Universal Love	44	2	—	—	—		Philadelphia International
1975	Philadelphia Freedom	39	14	30	—	—		Philadelphia International
1976	Summertime	106	18	21	—	—		Philadelphia International
1978	MFSB: The Gamble & Huff Orchestra	—	—	—	—	—		Philadelphia International
1980	Mysteries of the World	—	54	—	—	—		TSOP
"—" denotes a recording that did not chart or was not released in that territory.

=== Compilation albums ===
- End of Phase I: A Collection of Greatest Hits (1977, Philadelphia International)
- Greatest Hits (1990, TSOP)
- Love Is the Message: The Best of MFSB (1995, Legacy/Epic Associated)
- All in the Family (1997, Sony Music)
- Deep Grooves (1999, Epic Associated)
- The Essentials: MFSB (2018, Sony Music)

=== Singles ===
Year	Title	Peak chart positions									
Year	Title	US	US R&B	US Dance	AUS	AUT	CAN	GER	NLD	SWI	UK
1973	"Family Affair"	—	—	—	—	—	—	—	—	—	—
1974	"TSOP (The Sound of Philadelphia)" (featuring The Three Degrees)	1	1	—	12	17	1	5	18	3	22
1974	"Love Is the Message" (featuring The Three Degrees)	85	42	—	—	—	37	—	—	—	—
1975	"Sexy"	42	2	2	—	—	51	—	—	—	37
1975	"T.L.C. (Tender Lovin' Care)"	—	54	—	—	—	—	—	—	—	—
1975	"K-Jee"	—	—	18	—	—	—	—	—	—	—
1975	"The Zip"	91	72	—	—	—	—	—	24	—	—
1976	"Philadelphia Freedom"	—	—	—	—	—	—	—	—	—	—
1976	"Picnic in the Park"	—	—	14	—	—	—	—	—	—	—
1976	"Summertime and I'm Feelin' Mellow"	—	65	14	—	—	—	—	—	—	—
1976	"We Got the Time"	—	—	—	—	—	—	—	—	—	—
1977	"Let's Clean Up the Ghetto" (with Philadelphia International All Stars)	91	4	26	—	—	—	—	8	—	34
1978	"Use ta Be My Guy"	—	94	—	—	—	—	—	—	—	—
1978	"To Be in Love"	—	—	—	—	—	—	—	—	—	—
1980	"Manhattan Skyline"	—	—	—	—	—	—	—	—	—	—
1980	"Mysteries of the World"	—	—	—	—	—	—	—	—	—	41
1994	"TSOP (Theme from Soul Train '94)" (vs Johnny Vicious)	—	—	—	—	—	—	—	—	—	98
"—" denotes a recording that did not chart or was not released in that territory.

== See also ==
- The Funk Brothers
- The Nashville A-Team
- Compass Point All Stars
- Muscle Shoals Rhythm Section
- Hi Rhythm Section
- The Section
- Booker T. & the M.G.'s
- The Memphis Boys
- The Wrecking Crew
- Abnuceals Emuukha Electric Symphony Orchestra
- The J.B.'s
- The Love Unlimited Orchestra
- Tower of Power Horn Section
