= The Trammps discography =

Band discography

- Studio albums: 9
- Compilation albums: 15
- Singles: 43

This is the discography of American disco and soul band the Trammps.

== Albums ==
=== Studio albums ===
| Title | Album details | Peak chart positions | | | | | |
| Title | Album details | US | US R&B | AUS | CAN | FIN | SWE |
|---|---|---|---|---|---|---|---|
| Trammps | Released: April 1975; Label: Golden Fleece; Formats: LP | 159 | 30 | — | — | — | — |
| The Legendary Zing Album | Released: June 1975; Label: Buddah; Formats: LP, MC | — (Note: The Legendary Zing Album didn't enter the Billboard 200, but it did peak at number 186 on the Record World Top 200 Album Chart.) | — | — | — | — | — |
| Where the Happy People Go | Released: April 15, 1976; Label: Atlantic; Formats: LP, MC | 50 | 13 | — | 65 | — | 42 |
| Disco Inferno | Released: December 29, 1976; Label: Atlantic; Formats: LP, MC, 8-track | 46 | 16 | 65 | — | — | 27 |
| The Trammps III | Released: November 10, 1977; Label: Atlantic; Formats: LP, MC, 8-track | 85 | 27 | — | 64 | — | — |
| The Whole World's Dancing | Released: April 25, 1979; Label: Atlantic; Formats: LP, MC, 8-track | 184 | — | — | — | — | — |
| Mixin' It Up | Released: April 1980; Label: Atlantic; Formats: LP, MC, 8-track | — | — | — | — | 23 | — |
| Slipping Out | Released: December 1980; Label: Atlantic; Formats: LP, MC, 8-track | — | — | — | — | — | — |
| This One Is for the Party | Released: 1984; Label: Injection Disco Dance; Formats: LP; Netherlands-only release | — | — | — | — | — | — |
"—" denotes releases that did not chart or were not released in that territory.

=== Compilation albums ===
| Title | Album details | Peak chart positions | | |
| Title | Album details | US | US R&B | NL |
|---|---|---|---|---|
| The Best of the Trammps Featuring: MFSB & The Three Degrees | Released: February 1975; Label: Philadelphia International; Formats: LP; Europe-only release | — | — | 14 |
| Disco Champs | Released: 1977; Label: Philadelphia International; Formats: LP, MC | — | — | — |
| The Best of the Trammps | Released: August 1978; Label: Atlantic; Formats: LP, MC, 8-track | 139 | 57 | 49 |
| The Collection | Released: October 1991; Label: Arcade; Formats: CD; Netherlands-only release | — | — | 42 |
| Golden Classics | Released: 1992; Label: Collectables; Formats: CD | — | — | — |
| This Is Where the Happy People Go: The Best of the Trammps | Released: August 16, 1994; Label: Rhino; Formats: CD, MC | — | — | — |
| Disco Inferno and Other Hits | Released: January 20, 1998; Label: Flashback; Formats: CD, MC | — | — | — |
| All The Hits & the "Disco Inferno" | Released: March 20, 2001; Label: Goldenlane; Formats: CD | — | — | — |
| Dance Fever | Released: June 4, 2002; Label: Park South; Formats: CD | — | — | — |
| Hold Back the Night | Released: June 21, 2002; Label: Time Music; Formats: CD; UK-only release | — | — | — |
| Zing! | Released: September 23, 2002; Label: Hallmark; Formats: CD; UK-only release | — | — | — |
| 30 Years the Trammps: Only the Strong Survive | Released: June 2003; Label: Sony Music; Formats: CD; Netherlands-only release | — | — | — |
| The Definitive Collection | Released: May 14, 2012; Label: Music Club/Rhino; Formats: 2xCD; UK-only release | — | — | — |
| Playlist: The Best of the Trammps | Released: June 17, 2016; Label: Atlantic/Rhino; Formats: digital download | — | — | — |
| The Complete Albums 1976–1980 | Released: May 31, 2019; Label: Warner Music; Formats: digital download | — | — | — |
"—" denotes releases that did not chart or were not released in that territory.

== Singles ==
| Title | Year | Peak chart positions | | | | | | | | | | Certifications | Album |
| Title | Year | US BB | US Dance | US R&B | BEL (FL) | BEL (WA) | CAN | IRE | NL | NZ | UK | Certifications | Album |
|---|---|---|---|---|---|---|---|---|---|---|---|---|---|
| "Zing Went the Strings of My Heart" | 1972 | 64 | — | 17 | — | — | — | — | — | — | — | | The Legendary Zing Album |
| "Sixty Minute Man" | 1972 | 108 | — | — | — | — | — | — | — | — | — | | The Legendary Zing Album |
| "Pray All You Sinners" | 1973 | — | — | 34 | — | — | — | — | — | — | — | | The Legendary Zing Album |
| "Love Epidemic" | 1973 | — | — | 75 | 9 | 24 | — | — | 11 | — | — | | Trammps |
| "Where Do We Go from Here" | 1974 | — | — | 44 | — | — | — | — | — (Note: "Where Do We Go from Here" didn't enter the Dutch Single Top 30, but did peak at number 3 on the Single Tip chart.) | — | — | | Trammps |
| "Zing Went the Strings of My Heart" (Europe-only re-release) | 1974 | — | — | — | 11 | — | — | — | 5 | — | 29 | | The Legendary Zing Album |
| "Trusting Heart" | 1974 | 101 | 13 | 72 | — | — | — | — | — (Note: "Trusting Heart" didn't enter the Dutch Single Top 30, but did peak at number 3 on the Single Tip chart.) | — | — | | Trammps |
| "Shout" (Europe-only release) | 1974 | — | — | — | 7 | 36 | — | — | 5 | — | — | | Trammps |
| "Sixty Minute Man" (UK-only re-release) | 1975 | — | — | — | — | — | — | — | — (Note: "Sixty Minute Man" was re-released in the Netherlands in 1976 and peaked at number 19 on the Single Tip chart.) | — | 40 | | The Legendary Zing Album |
| "Stop and Think" | 1975 | — | 5 | — | — | — | — | — | — | — | — | | Trammps |
| "Save a Place" | 1975 | — | — | — | — | — | — | — | — (Note: "Save a Place" didn't enter the Dutch Single Top 30, but did peak at number 6 on the Single Tip chart.) | — | — | | Trammps |
| "Hooked for Life" | 1975 | — | 6 | 70 | — | — | — | — | 28 | — | — | | Where the Happy People Go |
| "Hold Back the Night" | 1975 | 35 | — | 10 | 25 | — | 71 | — | 11 | 29 | 5 | | The Legendary Zing Album |
| "Rubber Band" (UK-only release) | 1976 | — | — | — | — | — | — | — | — | — | — | | The Legendary Zing Album |
| "That's Where the Happy People Go" | 1976 | 27 | 1 (Note: All three tracks jointly topped the Record World Disco File Top 20 (along with "Can We Come Together") in May 1976 as cuts from the album Where the Happy People Go.) | 12 | — | — | 56 | — | — (Note: "That's Where the Happy People Go" didn't enter the Dutch Single Top 30, but did peak at number 4 on the Single Tip chart.) | — | 35 | | Where the Happy People Go |
| "Disco Party" (Netherlands and Belgium-only release) | 1976 | — | 1 | — | — | — | — | — | — (Note: "Disco Party" didn't enter the Dutch Single Top 30, but did peak at number 13 on the Single Tip chart.) | — | — | | Where the Happy People Go |
| "Soul Searchin' Time" | 1976 | — | 1 | 67 | — | — | — | — | — | — | 42 | | Where the Happy People Go |
| "Ninety-Nine and a Half" | 1976 | 105 | 8 | 76 | — | — | — | — | — | — | — | | Where the Happy People Go |
| "Trammps Disco Theme" (Spain, Japan and UK-only release) | 1976 | — | — | — | — | — | — | — | — | — | — | | Trammps |
| "Disco Inferno" | 1977 | 53 | 1 (Note: Topped the Billboard National Disco Action Top 40 chart in February 1977 along with the tracks "Starvin'" and "Body Contact Contract" as cuts from the album Disco Inferno.) | 9 | 24 | — | 70 | — | — (Note: "Disco Inferno" didn't enter the Dutch Single Top 30, but did peak at number 6 on the Single Tip chart.) | — | 16 | BPI: Silver | Disco Inferno |
| "I Feel Like I've Been Livin' (On the Dark Side of the Moon)" | 1977 | 105 | — | 52 | — | — | — | — | — | — | — | | Disco Inferno |
| "The Night the Lights Went Out" | 1977 | 104 | 6 | 80 | 8 | — | — | — | 10 | — | — | | The Trammps III |
| "Disco Inferno" (re-release) | 1978 | 11 | — | — | — | — | 6 | — | — | 13 | 47 | | Disco Inferno |
| "Seasons for Girls" | 1978 | — | — | 50 | — | — | — | — | — | — | — | | The Trammps III |
| "Soul Bones" | 1978 | — | 31 | 91 | — | — | — | — | — | — | — | | The Whole World's Dancing |
| "Teaser" | 1979 | — | 75 | — | — | — | — | — | — | — | — | | The Whole World's Dancing |
| "Hard Rock and Disco" | 1980 | — | 76 | — | — | — | — | — | — | — | — | | Mixin' It Up |
| "Music Freek" | 1980 | — | — | — | — | — | — | — | — | — | — | | Mixin' It Up |
| "Looking for You" | 1980 | — | — | — | — | — | — | — | — | — | — | | Slipping Out |
| "Breathtaking View" | 1981 | — | — | — | — | — | — | — | — | — | — | | Slipping Out |
| "Up on the Hill (Mt. U)" | 1983 | — | — | 79 | — | — | — | — | — | — | — | | Non-album singles |
| "What Happened to the Music" | 1983 | — | — | — | — | — | — | — | — | — | — | | Non-album singles |
| "Move" (Europe-only release) | 1984 | — | — | — | 37 | — | — | — | 37 | — | — | | This One Is for the Party |
| "Twenty-Five Miles" (Netherlands-only release) | 1984 | — | — | — | — | — | — | — | — | — | — | | This One Is for the Party |
| "I Will Be Here for You" (Netherlands-only release) | 1984 | — | — | — | — | — | — | — | — | — | — | | This One Is for the Party |
| "Zing Went the Strings of My Heart" ('85 Remake; Netherlands-only release) | 1985 | — | — | — | — | — | — | — | — | — | — | | Non-album singles |
| "Let's Go Crazy" (Netherlands and Italy-only release) | 1986 | — | — | — | — | — | — | — | — | — | — | | Non-album singles |
| "Hold Back the Night" (KWS featuring the Trammps) | 1992 | — | — | — | — | — | — | 20 | — | — | — | | KWS (by KWS) |
| "Ten Per Cent" (UK-only release) | 1993 | — | — | — | — | — | — | — | — | — | — | | Non-album single |
| "Mighty High" (Gloria Gaynor featuring the Trammps) | 1997 | — | 12 | — | — | — | — | — | — | — | — | | The Answer (by Gaynor) |
| "Disco Inferno" (Gerard Joling featuring the Trammps; Netherlands-only release) | 2001 | — | — | — | — | — | — | — | — | — | — | | Only the Strong Songs Survive (by Joling) |
| "Only the Strong Survive" (Netherlands-only release) | 2003 | — | — | — | — | — | — | — | — | — | — | | 30 Years the Trammps: Only the Strong Survive |
| "Disco Inferno" (UK-only re-release) | 2004 | — | — | — | — | — | — | — | — | — | 117 | | Non-album single |
"—" denotes releases that did not chart or were not released in that territory.
