= Breakaway (First Choice album) =

Studio album by First Choice
- Released: 1980
- Recorded: Sigma Sound Studios (Philadelphia, Pennsylvania); Alpha International (Philadelphia, Pennsylvania); Eras Recording Studio (New York City, New York)
- Genre: Philadelphia soul; disco
- Label: Gold Mind
- Producer: Norman Harris, Melvin Steals, Mervin Steals, McKinley Jackson, T.G. Conway, Allan Felder, Cary Gilbert

First Choice chronology
Hold Your Horses (1979)	Breakaway (1980)

Breakaway is the sixth and final studio album recorded by the American female vocal trio First Choice, released in 1980 on the Gold Mind label.

The album includes the title track, which peaked at No. 80 on the Hot Dance/Disco chart. The album was remastered and reissued with bonus tracks in 2013 by Octave Lab Records.

== Track listing ==
Side one
No.	Title	Writer(s)	Length
1.	"I'm the One"	Robert Strother, Jr., Frank Alstin, Jr., Mikki Farrow	4:17
2.	"Breakaway"	Norman Harris, Ron Tyson	5:50
3.	"Sittin' Pretty"	Mervin Steals, Melvin Steals	4:57
4.	"A Happy Love Affair"	T.G. Conway, Allan Felder, Cary Gilbert	5:10

Side two
No.	Title	Writer(s)	Length
5.	"Pressure Point"	Robert Strother, Jr., Frank Alstin, Jr., Mikki Farrow	5:50
6.	"I Can Show You (Better Than I Can Tell You)"	T.G. Conway, Allan Felder, Cary Gilbert	5:19
7.	"Can't Take It With You"	Mervin Steals, Melvin Steals	5:10
8.	"House for Sale"	Mervin Steals, Melvin Steals, McKinley Jackson, Robert Ledbetter	3:38

2013 remastered reissue bonus tracks
No.	Title	Length
9.	"Breakaway" (Original Tee Scott 12" Mix)	6:54
10.	"I Can Show You (Better Than I Can Tell You)" (Original Tee Scott 12" Mix)	7:23

== Personnel ==
- Rochelle Fleming, Annette Guest, Debbie Martin – vocals
- Keith Benson – drums
- Jimmy Williams – electric bass
- Eric C. Butler – acoustic piano
- Ron Kersey, Carlton "Cotton" Kent, T.G. Conway, Eugene Curry – keyboards
- Norman Harris, Bobby Eli, T.J. Tindall, Dennis Harris, Edward Moore, James Turner, Richard Adderly – guitars
- Larry Washington, Ron Tyson – congas
- Melvin Steals, Mervin Steals, Richard Adderly – percussion
- George Bussey – saxophone
- Richard Adderly – vibes
- Don Renaldo – strings, horns

== Charts ==
Singles

Year	Single	Peak
Year	Single	US Dance
1980	"Breakaway"	80
