= Delusions (First Choice album) =

Studio album by First Choice
- Released: 1977
- Recorded: Sigma Sound, Philadelphia, Pennsylvania
- Genre: Philadelphia soul; disco
- Label: Gold Mind
- Producer: Norman Harris, Ron Kersey, Ronnie Baker, Earl Young, Bruce Hawes

First Choice chronology
So Let Us Entertain You (1976)	Delusions (1977)	Hold Your Horses (1979)

Professional ratings
Review scores
Source	Rating
AllMusic	4/5 stars

Delusions is the fourth studio album recorded by American female vocal trio First Choice, released in 1977 on the Gold Mind label.

== History ==
The album features the song "Doctor Love", which peaked at No. 41 on the Billboard Hot 100 and No. 23 on the Hot Soul Singles chart. Another single, "Love Having You Around", had moderate success on the charts. The album was remastered and reissued with bonus tracks in 2012 by Big Break Records.

== Track listing ==
Side one
No.	Title	Writer(s)	Length
1.	"Doctor Love"	Ron Tyson, Norman Harris, Allan Felder	5:17
2.	"Indian Giver"	Ron Tyson, Norman Harris, Allan Felder	4:51
3.	"Love Having You Around"	Stevie Wonder, Syreeta Wright	6:57
4.	"Gamble on Love"	Ron Tyson, Ronnie Baker	3:00

Side two
No.	Title	Writer(s)	Length
5.	"Chances Go Around"	Ron Tyson, Allan Felder, Norman Harris	6:00
6.	"I Love You More Than Before"	Ron Kersey, Cheryl Dickinson	4:16
7.	"Let No Man Put Asunder"	Bruce Gray, Bruce Hawes	4:28
8.	"Do Me Again"	Bruce Gray, Mikki Farrow, T.G. Conway	3:50
9.	"Jimmy "D""	Bruce Hawes, Mikki Farrow	2:55

2012 remastered reissue bonus tracks
No.	Title	Length
10.	"Doctor Love" (Single Version)	3:42
11.	"Love Having You Around" (Single Version)	3:46
12.	"Indian Giver" (Single Version)	3:21
13.	"Doctor Love" (12" Tom Moulton Disco Mix)	7:37
14.	"Let No Man Put Asunder" (12" Shep Pettibone Remix)	8:01
15.	"Let No Man Put Asunder" (12" Frankie Knuckles Remix)	7:34

== Personnel ==
- Rochelle Fleming, Annette Guest, Ursula Herring – vocals
- Earl Young, Keith Benson – drums
- Ronnie Baker, Michael "Sugarbear" Foreman, Jim Williams – bass
- Norman Harris, T.J. Tindall, Bobby Eli, Ken Dockins – guitars
- Ron Kersey, Carlton "Cotton" Kent, Bruce Hawes, Bruce Gray – keyboards
- Larry Washington, Jesse Harris – congas and bongos
- Vincent Montana Jr. – vibes
- Ron Kersey, Bruce Hawes – synthesizer
- Don Renaldo (Charles Apollonia, Rudolph Malizia, Lance Elbeck, Christine Reeves, Richard Jones) – violins
- Anthony Sinagoga, Davis Barnett – violas
- Romeo Di Stefano – cello
- Richard Genovese, Roger De Lillo, Fred Joiner – trombones
- Rocco Bene, Robert Hartzell – trumpets and flugelhorns
- Jack Faith – flute
- Joe De Angelis, Milton Phibbs – French horns
- Leno Zachery – alto saxophone
- John H. Davis – baritone saxophone

== Charts ==
Chart (1977)	Peak
U.S. Billboard Top LPs	103

Singles

Year	Single	Peak chart positions		
Year	Single	US	US	US R&B
1977	"Doctor Love"	41	23	8
1977	"Love Having You Around"	—	68	—
