= Mixin' It Up =

Studio album by The Trammps
- Released: 1980
- Studio: Sigma Sound, Philadelphia, Pennsylvania; Total Experience, Hollywood, California
- Genre: Disco
- Label: Atlantic
- Producer: Earl Young, Ron Kersey, Ron Baker

The Trammps chronology
The Whole World's Dancing (1979)	Mixin' It Up (1980)	Slipping Out (1980)

Singles from Mixin ' It Up
- 1. "Hard Rock And Disco" Released: 1980

Mixin' It Up is the seventh studio album by American soul-disco group, The Trammps, released in 1980 through Atlantic Records.

== Commercial performance ==
The album features the single "Hard Rock and Disco", which peaked at No. 76 on the Hot Dance Club Play chart.

== Track listing ==
All tracks are written by Earl Young, except where noted.

Side one
No.	Title	Length
1.	"Hard Rock and Disco"	6:44
2.	"You Can Make It"	3:53
3.	"Music Freek"	4:58
4.	"Dance Contest"	4:07

Side two
No.	Title	Writer(s)	Length
5.	"Everybody Boogie"		5:21
6.	"V.I.P."		5:09
7.	"Let Me Dance Real Close"	Ron Kersey, Leroy Green	4:15
8.	"Wake Up from Yesterday"	Ron Baker	3:25

== Personnel ==
The Trammps

- Earl Young
- Harold Wade
- Stanley Wade
- Robert Upchurch
- Jimmy Ellis

Additional personnel

- Norman Harris, T.J. Tindall, Roland Chambers, Bobby Eli – guitars
- Ronnie Baker, Vince Fay – bass
- Eugene Curry, Cotton Kent, Ron Kersey, Bruce Gray, Lenny Pakula – keyboards
- Earl Young – drums
- Vincent Montana Jr. – vibraphone
- Larry Washington, James Walker, Weldon McDougall – percussion
- Don Renaldo & His Strings – strings (except on "Let Me Dance Real Close" strings by Paul Schorr & His Strings)
- Reuben Henderson, Harold Watkins, Artie Williams, Joseph Smithers, Jr. – horns (except on "Let Me Dance Real Close" horns by Maurice Spears & His Horns)
