= The Whole World's Dancing =

Studio album by the Trammps
- Released: February 14, 1979
- Studios: Sigma Sound, Philadelphia, Pennsylvania; Total Experience, Hollywood, California
- Genres: Disco, soul
- Length: 38:18
- Label: Atlantic
- Producers: Norman Harris, Bruce Gray, Ron Baker, Ron "Have Mercy" Kersey

The Trammps chronology
The Trammps III (1977)	The Whole World's Dancing (1979)	Mixin' It Up (1980)

The Whole World's Dancing is the sixth studio album by American musical group the Trammps, released in 1979 through Atlantic Records.

== Commercial performance ==
The album peaked at No. 184 on the Billboard 200. The album features the single "Soul Bones", which peaked at No. 91 on the Hot Soul Singles chart.

== Critical reception ==
Professional ratings
Review scores
Source	Rating
AllMusic	3/5 stars
The Virgin Encyclopedia of R&B and Soul	2/5 stars

The New York Times noted that, "for simple-minded reductionism, these five men approach the Ramones, and presumably aren't trying to be funny or arty."

== Track listing ==
Side one
No.	Title	Writer(s)	Length
1.	"Love Insurance Policy"	Norman Harris, Bruce Gray	7:02
2.	"Teaser"	Norman Harris, Ron Tyson, Allan Felder	6:16
3.	"The Whole World's Dancing"	Ron Baker	6:03

Side two
No.	Title	Writer(s)	Length
1.	"My Love, It's Never Been Better"	Bruce Gray	5:36
2.	"Soul Bones"	Ron Kersey, Leroy Green	5:35
3.	"Love Magnet"	Norman Harris, Leroy Green	4:41
4.	"More Good Times to Remember"	Ron Baker	3:05

== Personnel ==
The Trammps

- Earl Young
- Harold Wade
- Stanley Wade
- Robert Upchurch
- Jimmy Ellis

Additional personnel

- Norman Harris, T.J. Tindall, Bobby Eli, Harold Wade, Charles Ellerbee, Larry Washington, Carlton Kent, Ron "Have Mercy" Kersey, Bruce Gray, Eugene Curry, Ronald Baker, Earl Young, James Walker, Keith Benson, Jimmy Williams, Mikki Farrow – rhythm section
- Barbara Ingram, Evette Benton, Carla Benson – background vocals
- Artie Williams, Harold Watkins, Rueben Henderson – horn section
- Don Renaldo and His Strings and Horns (except on "Soul Bones", horns by Paul Schorr & His Strings and Maurice Spears & His Horns)
- Stevie Wonder – harmonica on "Soul Bones"

== Charts ==
Album

Chart (1979)	Peaks
U.S. Billboard Top LPs	184

Singles

Year	Single	Peaks	
Year	Single	US R&B	US Dan
1978	"Soul Bones"	91	31
1979	"Teaser"	—	75
