= The Trammps III =

Studio album by the Trammps
- Released: November 10, 1977
- Studio: Sigma Sound, Philadelphia, Pennsylvania
- Genre: Disco, soul
- Length: 43:05
- Label: Atlantic
- Producer: Norman Harris, Ron "Have Mercy" Kersey, Ron Baker

The Trammps chronology
Disco Inferno (1976)	The Trammps III (1977)	The Whole World's Dancing (1979)

Professional ratings
Review scores
Source	Rating
AllMusic	3/5 stars
The Encyclopedia of Popular Music	2/5 stars
The New Rolling Stone Record Guide	2/5 stars

The Trammps III is the fifth studio album by the American soul-disco group the Trammps, released in 1977 through Atlantic Records.

== Commercial performance ==
The album peaked at No. 27 on the R&B albums chart. It also reached No. 85 on the Billboard 200. The album includes the singles "The Night the Lights Went Out", which peaked at No. 80 on the Hot Soul Singles chart, and "Seasons for Girls", which charted at No. 50 on the Hot Soul Singles chart.

== Track listing ==
Side one
No.	Title	Writer(s)	Length
1.	"The Night the Lights Went Out"	Allan Felder, Norman Harris, Ron Tyson	7:06
2.	"Love Per Hour"	Leroy Green, Ron Kersey	5:11
3.	"People of the World, Rise"	Bruce Gray, T.G. Conway, Norman Harris	9:24

Side two
No.	Title	Writer(s)	Length
4.	"Living the Life"	Ron Baker, Ron Tyson	3:50
5.	"Seasons for Girls"	Jerry Akins, Johnny Bellmon, Reginald Turner	7:56
6.	"Life Ain't Been Easy"	Ron Baker, Ron Tyson	3:12
7.	"I'm So Glad You Came Along"	Ron Baker, Ron Tyson	2:55
8.	"It Don't Take Much"	Ron Baker, Ron Tyson	3:18

== Personnel ==
The Trammps

- Earl Young
- Harold Wade
- Stanley Wade
- Robert Upchurch
- Jimmy Ellis

Additional personnel

- Norman Harris, Bobby Eli, T.J. Tindall – guitars
- Ron "Have Mercy" Kersey, Bruce Gray, Carlton Kent – keyboards
- Ron Baker, Sugar Bear Foreman – bass
- Earl Young – drums
- T.G. Conway – synthesizer
- Don Renaldo and His Strings and Horns (except on "Love Per Hour" horns by Fred Wesley and the Horny Horns)

== Charts ==
Album

Chart (1977)	Peaks
U.S. Billboard Top LPs	85
U.S. Billboard Top Soul LPs	27

Singles

Year	Single	Peaks		
Year	Single	US	US R&B	US Dan
1977	"The Night the Lights Went Out"	104	80	6
1978	"Seasons for Girls"	—	50	—
