= The Player (First Choice album) =

Studio album by First Choice
- Released: 1974
- Recorded: Sigma Sound, Philadelphia, Pennsylvania; Future Gold, Philadelphia, Pennsylvania
- Genre: Philadelphia soul; disco
- Label: Philly Groove
- Producer: Stan Watson, Norman Harris

First Choice chronology
Armed and Extremely Dangerous (1973)	The Player (1974)	So Let Us Entertain You (1976)

Professional ratings
Review scores
Source	Rating
Allmusic	2.5/5 stars

The Player is the second studio album recorded by the American female vocal trio First Choice, released in 1974 on the Philly Groove label.

== Chart history ==
The album features the title track, which peaked at #70 on the Billboard Hot 100 and #7 on the Hot Soul Singles. Another single, "Guilty", had moderate success on the charts.

== Track listing ==
Side one
No.	Title	Writer(s)	Length
1.	"The Player"	Norman Harris, Allan Felder	7:10
2.	"Guilty"	Ron Roker, Gerry Shury	4:51
3.	"You Took the Words Right Out of My Mouth"	Bunny Sigler, Norman Harris, Allan Felder	4:44
4.	"You've Been Doin' Wrong for So Long"	Frank Johnson, Terry Woodford,	3:56

Side two
No.	Title	Writer(s)	Length
5.	"Hustler Bill"	Bunny Sigler, Jean Lang	5:28
6.	"All I Need Is Time"	Bob Reneu	4:42
7.	"Guess What Mary Jones Did"	Norman Harris, Allan Felder	4:59
8.	"Guilty (Instrumental)"	Ron Roker, Gerry Shury	4:51

== Personnel ==
- Norman Harris, Bobby Eli, Herb Smith, Ron Smith – guitars
- Ronnie Baker, Barry Gibson – bass
- Earl Young, Jerry Goldsmith – drums
- Larry Washington – congas and bongos
- Ron Kersey – piano and organ
- Prime Cut – rhythm on "Guilty" and "All I Need Is Time"
- Don Renaldo & the Sound of Philadelphia Strings (Albert Barone, Charles Apollonia, Angelo Petrella, Diane Barnett, Romeo Di Stefano, Rudy Malizia, Joe Donofrio, Christine Reeves) – strings
- Davis Barnett, Angelo Petrella – violas
- Romeo Di Stefano – cello
- Rocco Bene, Robert Hartzell – horns and trumpets
- Fred Linge, Richard Genovese, Edward Cascarella – bass trombones
- Fred Joiner – tenor trombone
- Leno Zachery – alto saxophone
- Danny Williams – French horn

== Charts ==
Chart (1974)	Peak
U.S. Billboard Top LPs	143
U.S. Billboard Top Soul LPs	36

Singles

Year	Single	Peak chart positions	
Year	Single	US	US R&B
1974	"The Player (Part 1)"	70	7
1974	"Guilty"	103	19
