= Armed and Extremely Dangerous =

Studio album by First Choice
- Released: 1973
- Recorded: Sigma Sound, Philadelphia, Pennsylvania
- Genre: Philadelphia soul; disco
- Label: Philly Groove
- Producer: Stan Watson, Norman Harris

First Choice chronology
Armed and Extremely Dangerous (1973)	The Player (1974)

Professional ratings
Review scores
Source	Rating
Allmusic	3/5 stars
Christgau's Record Guide	B

Armed and Extremely Dangerous is the debut studio album recorded by the American female vocal trio First Choice, released in 1973 on the Philly Groove label.

== History ==
The album features the title track, which peaked at #28 on the Billboard Hot 100 and #11 on the Hot Soul Singles. Also featured are two other chart singles: "Smarty Pants" and "Newsy Neighbors".

== Track listing ==
Side one
No.	Title	Writer(s)	Length
1.	"Smarty Pants"	Allan Felder, Norman Harris	2:38
2.	"Runnin' Out of Fools"	Kay Rogers, Richard Ahlert	3:32
3.	"A Boy Named Junior"	Chuck Brooks	3:41
4.	"Love and Happiness"	Al Green, Teenie Hodges	6:57
5.	"Wake Up to Me"	Allan Felder, Norman Harris	3:45

Side two
No.	Title	Writer(s)	Length
6.	"Newsy Neighbors"	Allan Felder, Norman Harris	5:57
7.	"Armed and Extremely Dangerous"	Allan Felder, Norman Harris	2:48
8.	"This Little Woman"	Bobby Eli, Carl Fisher	3:50
9.	"This Is the House"	Allan Felder, Norman Harris	2:57
10.	"One Step Away"	Norman Harris, Ronnie Baker, Thom Bell	3:10

== Personnel ==
- Don Renaldo, Albert Barone, Charles Apollonia, Angelo Petrella, Diane Barnett, Romeo Di Stefano, Rudy Malizia, Joe Donofrio, Christine Reeves – violins
- Davis Barnett, Angelo Petrella – violas
- Romeo Di Stefano – cello
- Clinton Nieweg – harp
- Jimmy Grant, Ronnie Baker – bass
- Rocco Bene, Robert Hartzell – trumpets
- Fred Linge, Richard Genovese, Edward Cascarella – bass trombones
- Fred Joiner – tenor trombone
- Leno Zachery – alto saxophone
- Joe De Angelis, Danny Eillions, Scott Temple, Milton Phibbs – French horns
- Larry Washington, James Hicks – congas and bongos
- Norman Harris, Roland Chambers, Bobby Eli – guitars
- Earl Young – drums
- Prime Cut – musicians on "Love and Happiness"

== Charts ==
Chart (1973)	Peak
U.S. Billboard Top LPs	184
U.S. Billboard Top Soul LPs	45

Singles

Year	Single	Peak chart positions	
Year	Single	US	US R&B
1973	"Armed and Extremely Dangerous"	28	11
1973	"Smarty Pants"	56	25
1974	"Newsy Neighbors"	97	35
