= Disco Inferno (album) =

Studio album by the Trammps
- Released: December 29, 1976 (discothèques); January 1977
- Studio: Sigma Sound, Philadelphia, Pennsylvania
- Genre: Disco
- Length: 42:21
- Label: Atlantic
- Producer: Norman Harris; Ronald Baker; Ron "Have Mercy" Kersey; Earl Young

The Trammps chronology
| Where the Happy People Go (1976) | Disco Inferno (1976) | The Trammps III (1977) |

Professional ratings
Review scores
| Source | Rating |
|---|---|
| AllMusic | 4.5/5 stars |
| Christgau's Record Guide | B |

Disco Inferno is the fourth studio album by American soul-disco group the Trammps. It premiered in discothèques on December 29, 1976, for New Year's Eve celebrations, and then was widely released through Atlantic Records in January 1977.

== Commercial performance ==
The album peaked at No. 16 on the R&B albums chart. It also reached No. 46 on the Billboard 200. The album features the title track, which peaked at No. 9 on the Hot Soul Singles chart, No. 11 on the Billboard Hot 100, and No. 1 on the Hot Dance Club Play chart, and "I Feel Like I've Been Livin' (On the Dark Side of the Moon)", which charted at No. 52 on the Hot Soul Singles chart.

== Track listing ==
Side one
| No. | Title | Writer(s) | Length |
|---|---|---|---|
| 1. | "Body Contact Contract" | Norman Harris, Bruce Gray, Jimmy Hendricks | 6:55 |
| 2. | "Starvin'" | Allan Felder, Ronald Tyson, Norman Harris, Earl Young | 7:05 |
| 3. | "I Feel Like I've Been Livin' (On the Dark Side of the Moon)" | Ronald Baker | 6:59 |

Side two
| No. | Title | Writer(s) | Length |
|---|---|---|---|
| 4. | "Disco Inferno" | Leroy Green, Ron "Have Mercy" Kersey | 10:59 |
| 5. | "Don't Burn No Bridges" | Allan Felder, Ronald Tyson, T.G. Conway | 6:00 |
| 6. | "You Touch My Hot Line" | Jerry Akins, Johnny Bellmon, Victor Drayton, Reginald Turner | 4:23 |

== Personnel ==
The Trammps

- Jimmy Ellis – lead vocal
- Robert Upchurch – lead and baritone vocal
- Earl Young – bass vocal, drums
- Harold Wade – first tenor
- Stanley Wade – second tenor

Additional personnel

- Ronald Baker – bass
- Norman Harris, Bobby Eli, T.J. Tindall – guitars
- Ron "Have Mercy" Kersey, T.G. Conway, Bruce Gray, Carlton Kent – keyboards
- Larry Washington, Robert Cupit – congas
- Allen Felder, Ronald Tyson – tambourines
- Barbara Ingram, Carla Benson, Evette Benton – background vocals
- Don Renaldo and His Strings and Horns
- Flash Wilson – The Trammps' M.C.

== Charts ==
Album

Chart performance for Disco Inferno
| Chart (1976–1977) | Peak position |
|---|---|
| Australian Albums (Kent Music Report) | 65 |
| Swedish Albums (Sverigetopplistan) | 27 |
| US Billboard Top LPs | 46 |
| US Billboard Top Soul LPs | 16 |

Singles

Chart performance of singles from Disco Inferno
| Title | Year | Peaks | | |
| Title | Year | US | US R&B | US Dan |
|---|---|---|---|---|
| "Disco Inferno" | 1976 | 53 | 9 | 1 |
| "Starvin'" | 1976 | — | — | 1 |
| "Body Contact Contract" | 1976 | — | — | 1 |
| "I Feel Like I've Been Livin' (On the Dark Side of the Moon)" | 1977 | 105 | 52 | — |
| "Disco Inferno" (re-release) | 1978 | 11 | — | — |
