= The Legendary Zing Album =

Studio album by the Trammps
- Released: June 1975
- Studio: Sigma Sound, Philadelphia, Pennsylvania
- Genre: Soul; disco
- Length: 34:08
- Label: Buddah
- Producer: Ronnie Baker; Norman Harris; Earl Young

The Trammps chronology
Trammps (1975)	The Legendary Zing Album (1975)	Where the Happy People Go (1976)

Professional ratings
Review scores
Source	Rating
AllMusic	3/5 stars
Christgau's Record Guide	B+

The Legendary Zing Album is the second studio album by American soul-disco group the Trammps, released in 1975 through Buddah Records.

== Commercial performance ==
The album consists of tracks recorded in the early 1970s with the Philadelphia Soul sound. The album features the singles "Zing! Went the Strings of My Heart", which peaked at No. 17 on the Hot Soul Singles chart and No. 64 on the Billboard Hot 100, "Pray All You Sinners", which peaked at No. 34 on the Hot Soul Singles chart, and "Hold Back the Night", which peaked at No. 10 on the Hot Soul Singles chart and No. 35 on the Billboard Hot 100.

== Legacy ==
The track "Rubber Band" was 30 years later sampled and used by rap artist the Game for his 2005 hit "Hate It Or Love It", and again the same year by Mary J. Blige on her song "MJB Da MVP".

== Track listing ==
Side one
No.	Title	Writer(s)	Length
1.	"Penguin at the Big Apple" / "Zing Went the Strings of My Heart" (Medley)	Norman Harris, Ronnie Baker, Earl Young / James F. Hanley	4:52
2.	"Pray All You Sinners"	Norman Harris, Ronnie Baker	5:24
3.	"Sixty Minute Man"	Billy Ward, Rose Marks	4:54
4.	"Scruboard"	Norman Harris, Ronnie Baker, Earl Young	3:12

Side two
No.	Title	Writer(s)	Length
5.	"Tom's Song"	Norman Harris, Ronnie Baker, Earl Young	3:14
6.	"Rubber Band"	Ronnie Baker, Allan Felder, Norman Harris	5:14
7.	"Hold Back the Night"	Ronnie Baker, Norman Harris, Allan Felder, Earl Young	3:54
8.	"Penguin at the Big Apple"	Norman Harris, Ronnie Baker, Earl Young	3:24

== Charts ==
Singles

Year	Single	Peaks	
Year	Single	US	US R&B
1972	"Zing! Went the Strings of My Heart"	64	17
1972	"Sixty Minute Man"	108	—
1973	"Pray All You Sinners"	—	34
1975	"Hold Back the Night"	35	10
