= Where the Happy People Go =

Studio album by the Trammps
- Released: April 15, 1976
- Studio: Sigma Sound, Philadelphia, Pennsylvania
- Genre: Disco; soul
- Length: 40:42
- Label: Atlantic
- Producer: Ronnie Baker; Norman Harris; Earl Young; T.G. Conway; Bruce Gray; Allan Felder; Ron "Have Mercy" Kersey

The Trammps chronology
The Legendary Zing Album (1975)	Where the Happy People Go (1976)	Disco Inferno (1976)

Professional ratings
Review scores
Source	Rating
AllMusic	3/5 stars
Christgau's Record Guide	B+

Where the Happy People Go is the third studio album by American soul-disco group the Trammps, released in 1976 through Atlantic Records.

== Commercial performance ==
The album peaked at No. 13 on the R&B albums chart. It also reached No. 50 on the Billboard 200. The album features the singles "That's Where the Happy People Go", which peaked at No. 12 on the Hot Soul Singles chart, No. 27 on the Billboard Hot 100, and No. 1 on the Hot Dance Club Play chart, and "Disco Party", which charted at No. 1 on the Hot Dance Club Play chart.

== Track listing ==
Side one
No.	Title	Writer(s)	Length
1.	"Soul Searchin' Time"	Leroy Green, Norman Harris	6:03
2.	"That's Where the Happy People Go"	Ronnie Baker	7:50
3.	"Can We Come Together"	T.G. Conway, Bruce Gray, Allan Felder	5:33

Side two
No.	Title	Writer(s)	Length
4.	"Disco Party"	T.G. Conway, Bruce Gray	8:11
5.	"Ninety-Nine and a Half"	Wilson Pickett, Steve Cropper, Eddie Floyd	5:07
6.	"Hooked for Life"	Bunny Sigler, Norman Harris, Allan Felder	4:42
7.	"Love Is a Funky Thing"	Ronnie Baker	3:16

== Personnel ==
The Trammps

- Jimmy Ellis – lead vocal
- Stanley Wade – vocal, bass
- Harold Wade – vocal
- Earl Young – vocal, drums
- Robert Upchurch – vocal

Additional personnel

- Bobby Eli, Norman Harris – guitar
- Ron "Have Mercy" Kersey – keyboards
- Bruce Gray – grand piano
- T.G. Conway – bass keyboards
- Ronnie Baker, Michael Foreman – bass
- Larry Washington – congas

== Charts ==
Album

Chart (1976)	Peaks
U.S. Billboard Top LPs	50
U.S. Billboard Top Soul LPs	13

Singles

Year	Single	Peaks		
Year	Single	US	US R&B	US Dan
1975	"Hooked for Life"	—	70	6
1976	"That's Where the Happy People Go"	27	12	1
1976	"Disco Party"	—	—	1
1976	"Soul Searchin' Time"	—	67	—
1976	"Ninety-Nine and a Half"	105	76	8
