= So Let Us Entertain You =

Studio album by First Choice
- Released: 1976
- Studio: Sigma Sound, Philadelphia, Pennsylvania
- Genre: Philadelphia soul; disco
- Label: Warner Bros./Philly Groove
- Producer: Stan Watson

First Choice chronology
The Player (1974)	So Let Us Entertain You (1976)	Delusions (1977)

Professional ratings
Review scores
Source	Rating
Allmusic	4.5/5 stars

So Let Us Entertain You is the third studio album recorded by the American female vocal trio First Choice, released in 1976 on the Warner Bros./Philly Groove label.

== History ==
The album features the song "Gotta Get Away (From You Baby)", which peaked at #64 on the Hot Soul Singles. Another single, "Let Him Go", had moderate success on the charts.

== Track listing ==
Side one
No.	Title	Writer(s)	Length
1.	"First Choice Theme"	Harold Cephas, Arnold Coley, Stan Watson	3:10
2.	"Ain't He Bad"	James Dean, John Glover	7:20
3.	"I'll Stay Right Here"	James Dean, John Glover	2:54
4.	"Yes, Maybe No"	Victor Drayton, Buddy Turner, Jerry Akins, John Bellmon	2:52
5.	"Gotta Get Away (From You Baby)"	James Dean, John Glover	5:27

Side two
No.	Title	Writer(s)	Length
6.	"Are You Ready for Me?"	Victor Drayton, Buddy Turner, Jerry Akins, John Bellmon	4:05
7.	"Don't Fake It"	Victor Drayton, Buddy Turner, Jerry Akins, John Bellmon	4:22
8.	"I Got a Feeling"	Homer Banks, Carl Hampton	5:27
9.	"Let Him Go"	James Dean, John Glover	5:53
10.	"If the Sun Shines"	James Dean, John Glover	3:26

== Personnel ==
- Ron "Have Mercy" Kersey – piano and clavinet
- Charles Collins – drums
- Dennis Harris, Bobby Eli, Norman Harris – guitars
- Vincent Montana Jr. – vibes
- Michael "Sugar Bear" Foreman – bass
- Larry Washington – congas and bongos
- Stan "The Man" Watson – percussion
- Don Renaldo & His Philadelphia Strings & Horns – strings

== Charts ==
Chart (1976)	Peak
U.S. Billboard Top Soul LPs	53

Singles

Year	Single	Peak chart positions	
Year	Single	US R&B	US Dan
1976	"Gotta Get Away (From You Baby)"	64	16
1976	"Let Him Go"	97	—
1976	"First Choice Theme" / "Ain't He Bad" (medley)	—	7
1976	"Are You Ready for Me?"	—	7
