= Trammps (album) =

Studio album by the Trammps
- Released: April 1975
- Studio: Sigma Sound, Philadelphia, Pennsylvania
- Genre: Soul; disco
- Label: Golden Fleece
- Producer: Ronnie Baker, Norman Harris, Earl Young

The Trammps chronology
| Trammps (1975) | The Legendary Zing Album (1975) |

Professional ratings
Review scores
| Source | Rating |
|---|---|
| AllMusic | 3/5 stars |
| Christgau's Record Guide | B+ |

The Trammps is the debut album by American soul-disco group the Trammps, released in April 1975 through Golden Fleece Records.

== Commercial performance ==
The album peaked at No. 30 on the R&B albums chart. It also reached No. 159 on the Billboard 200. The album features the singles "Love Epidemic", which peaked at No. 75 on the Hot Soul Singles chart, "Where Do We Go from Here", which charted at No. 44 on the Hot Soul Singles chart, and "Trusting Heart", which reached No. 72 on the Hot Soul Singles chart. "Where Do We Go from Here" was the last song played on closing night of New York's legendary disco Paradise Garage.

== Track listing ==
All tracks are written by Ronnie Baker, except where noted.

Side one
| No. | Title | Writer(s) | Length |
|---|---|---|---|
| 1. | "Stop and Think" | | 3:10 |
| 2. | "Trusting Heart" | Melvin Steals, Mervin Steals | 3:20 |
| 3. | "Every Dream I Dream Is You" | | 3:57 |
| 4. | "Love Epidemic" | Norman Harris, Leroy Green | 4:48 |
| 5. | "Save a Place" | | 5:03 |

Side two
| No. | Title | Writer(s) | Length |
|---|---|---|---|
| 6. | "Trammps Disco Theme" | Ronnie Baker, Norman Harris, Earl Young | 3:25 |
| 7. | "Where Do We Go from Here" | | 3:45 |
| 8. | "Down Three Dark Streets" | | 5:01 |
| 9. | "I Know That Feeling" | | 3:11 |
| 10. | "Shout" | O'Kelly Isley, Jr., Rudolph Isley, Ronald Isley | 3:33 |

2008 remastered reissue bonus tracks
| No. | Title | Length |
|---|---|---|
| 11. | "Oh Waa Hey" | 2:38 |
| 12. | "Just Say the Word" | 4:33 |
| 13. | "Love Epidemic" (Extended Version) | 5:58 |
| 14. | "Promise Me" | 4:52 |

== Personnel ==
- Dennis Harris – lead guitar
- Jimmy Ellis – lead vocal
- Michael Thompson – drums
- Earl Young – drums, vocal
- Doc Wade – guitar, vocal
- Stan Wade – bass, vocal
- John Hart – organ, vocal
- Ron Kersey – piano, vocal
- Roger Stevens – trumpet
- John Davis – saxophone
- Fred Jointer – trombone
- MFSB – music

== Charts ==
Album

| Chart (1975) | Peaks |
|---|---|
| U.S. Billboard Top LPs | 159 |
| U.S. Billboard Top Soul LPs | 30 |

Singles

| Year | Single | Peaks | | |
| Year | Single | US | US R&B | US Dan |
|---|---|---|---|---|
| 1973 | "Love Epidemic" | — | 75 | — |
| 1974 | "Where Do We Go from Here" | — | 44 | — |
| 1974 | "Trusting Heart" | 101 | 72 | 13 |
| 1975 | "Stop and Think" | — | — | 5 |
