= Hold Your Horses (First Choice album) =

Studio album by First Choice
- Released: 1979
- Recorded: Musicland, Munich, Germany; Sigma Sound, Philadelphia, Pennsylvania
- Genre: Soul, Philadelphia soul, disco
- Label: Gold Mind
- Producer: Tom Moulton, Thor Baldursson, McKinley Jackson, Norman Harris

First Choice chronology
Delusions (1977)	Hold Your Horses (1979)	Breakaway (1980)

Professional ratings
Review scores
Source	Rating
AllMusic	2/5 stars
The Virgin Encyclopedia of R&B and Soul	3/5 stars

Hold Your Horses is the fifth studio album by American female vocal trio First Choice. It was released in 1979 on the Gold Mind label.

== History ==
The album features the title track, which peaked at No. 73 on the Hot Soul Singles chart, and "Double Cross", which peaked at No. 60 on the same chart. The album was remastered and reissued with bonus tracks in 2013 by Big Break Records.

== Track listing ==
Side one
No.	Title	Writer(s)	Length
1.	"Let Me Down Easy"	David Jordan, Andrew Smith	6:20
2.	"Good Morning Midnight"	Thor Baldursson, Mats Bjöerklund, Pete Bellotte	3:57
3.	"Great Expectations"	Thor Baldursson, Mats Bjöerklund, Pete Bellotte	5:33

Side two
No.	Title	Writer(s)	Length
4.	"Hold Your Horses"	Kathleen Poppy, Les Hurdle, Frank Ricotti, Peter Gosling	5:50
5.	"Love Thang"	Melvin Steals, Mervin Steals, McKinley Jackson	5:41
6.	"Double Cross"	Norman Harris, Ron Tyson	6:59

2013 remastered reissue bonus tracks
No.	Title	Length
7.	"Now That I've Thrown It All Away"	3:36
8.	"Let No Man Put Asunder" (12" Disco Madness Remix)	4:40
9.	"Double Cross" (12" Promotional Disco Remix)	7:36
10.	"Love Thang" (12" Disco Mix)	7:54
11.	"Hold Your Horses" (Single Version)	2:38
12.	"Double Cross" (12" Extended Disco Mix)	10:01
13.	"Double Cross" (12" Larry Levan Remix)	7:18

== Personnel ==
- Rochelle Fleming, Annette Guest, Debbie Martin – vocals

Musicland Studios

- Keith Forsey – percussion, drums
- Les Hurdle – bass
- Mats Björklund – guitar
- Thor Baldursson – keyboards
- Larry Washington – congas
- Tom Moulton – tambourine
- Munich Philharmonic – strings
- Don Renaldo – horns
- John Davis – saxophone solo on "Let Me Down Easy

Sigma Sound Studios

- Keith Benson – drums
- Jimmy Williams – bass
- Norman Harris, Bobby Eli, T.J. Tindall – guitars
- Eugene "Lambchops" Curry – keyboards
- Larry Washington, James Walker – congas
- Don Renaldo – strings, horns

== Charts ==
Chart (1979)	Peak
U.S. Billboard Top LPs	135
U.S. Billboard Top Soul LPs	58

Singles

Year	Single	Peak chart positions	
Year	Single	US R&B	US Dan
1979	"Hold Your Horses"	73	—
1979	"Double Cross"	60	—
1979	"Love Thang"	—	52
