= Christmas Jollies II =

1981 album by The Salsoul Orchestra

Studio album by The Salsoul Orchestra
- Released: December 1981
- Studio: Blank Tape Studios (New York City)
- Genres: Christmas; disco
- Length: 40:20
- Label: Salsoul Records
- Producer: Patrick Adams

The Salsoul Orchestra chronology
How High (1979)	Christmas Jollies II (1981)	Heat It Up (1982)

Christmas Jollies II is the 10th studio album done by The Salsoul Orchestra, produced by disco producer Patrick Adams, recorded and released in December 1981 on Salsoul Records. It is the orchestra's second Christmas album. It is the follow-up to Christmas Jollies, but was not as successful as the first album, which was released in November 1976 and produced by Vincent Montana Jr. Side one features lead vocals by Wendell Morrison and Marian Rolle, who were with The Players Association on the 1980 album, We've Got The Groove, plus Jocelyn Brown. Side two is instrumental, with flutist Art Webb, especially on two disco versions of two tracks, "The Salsoul Christmas Suite", based on "The Nutcracker Suite" and "Joyful Spirit", based on "Jesu, Joy of Man's Desiring". The mid-tempo disco version of "God Rest You Merry Gentlemen" is semi-instrumental with the vocal chorus singing. On that disco version of "God Rest Ye Merry Gentlemen", Jocelyn Brown did not sing the lead; it was a chorus of five studio singers singing in the background named Venus Dodson, Wendell Morrison, Marian Rolle, Rene Mills and Margo Williams.

== Track listing ==
=== Side one ===
1. "You're All I Want For Christmas": Jocelyn Brown - lead vocal
2. "Deck The Halls": Marian Rolle - lead vocal
3. "Joy To The World": Wendell Morrison - lead vocal

=== Side two ===
1. "The Salsoul Christmas Suite": (Based on The Nutcracker Suite/Medley: Miniature Overture/Marche/Dance of the Sugar Plum Fairy/Miniature Overture (Reprise))
2. "God Rest Ye Merry Gentlemen": Venus Dodson, Rene Mills, Wendell Morrison, Marian Rolle, Margo Williams - chorus vocals
3. "Joyful Spirit": (Based on "Jesu, Joy of Man's Desiring")

== Personnel ==
- Yogi Horton, Buddy Williams - drums
- John Miller - bass
- Art Webb - flute (Tracks: B1, B2, B3)
- Katie Kirkpatrick - harp
- Stan Lucas, Daniel Harris, David Chun - guitar
- Patrick Adams - keyboards
- John Cooksey, Isidro Ross - congas, percussion
- Ted Dormoi - glockenspiel
- Jeff Delinko and his strings and horns - strings and horns
- Rene Mills, Wendell Morrison, Margo Williams, Venus Dodson, Marian Rolle - backing vocals (Tracks: A1, A2, A3)
- Produced, arranged & conducted by Patrick Adams
