= Armed and Extremely Dangerous (song) =

"Armed & Extremely Dangerous"

Single by First Choice

from the album Armed and Extremely Dangerous
- B-side: "Gonna Keep on Lovin' Him"
- Released: March 1973
- Studio: Sigma Sound, Philadelphia, Pennsylvania
- Genre: Disco; Philadelphia soul
- Label: Philly Groove Records
- Songwriters: Allan Felder; Norman Harris
- Producers: Stan Watson; Norman Harris

First Choice singles chronology
"This Is the House (Where Love Died)" (1972)	"Armed & Extremely Dangerous" (1973)	"Smarty Pants" (1973)

Music video
- "Armed and Extremely Dangerous" on YouTube (TV performance on Soul Train)

"Armed and Extremely Dangerous" is a 1973 song by American girl group First Choice from their album Armed and Extremely Dangerous. It is their highest-charting single in the US and is arguably the band's most well-known song.

The song became a Top 20 hit in the United Kingdom. It reached the Top 40 in the United States.

== Track listing ==
=== 7" single ===
A - Armed & Extremely Dangerous - 2:49

B - Gonna Keep On Lovin' Him - 2:44

=== Maxi single ===
1 - Armed & Extremely Dangerous (Full Intention Radio Edit) - 3:36

2 - Armed & Extremely Dangerous (Blowout Express Soul Mix) - 4:30

3 - Armed & Extremely Dangerous (Original version) - 2:46

4 - Armed & Extremely Dangerous (Full Intention Vocal) - 6:08

5 - Armed & Extremely Dangerous (Black Science Restoration Vocal) - 6:37

6 - Armed & Extremely Dangerous (Cevin's Classic Club) - 7:06

7 - Armed & Extremely Dangerous (South Beach Cool Out Jazz Mix) - 8:15

== Charts ==
Chart (1973)	Peak position
Canada RPM Top Singles	55
UK Singles (OCC)	16
US Billboard Hot 100	28
US Cash Box Top 100	19
US Billboard Best Selling Soul Singles	11
UK Blues & Soul magazine chart	1

Chart (1997)	Peak position
UK Singles (OCC)	88
