= Disco Inferno =

1976 single by the Trammps

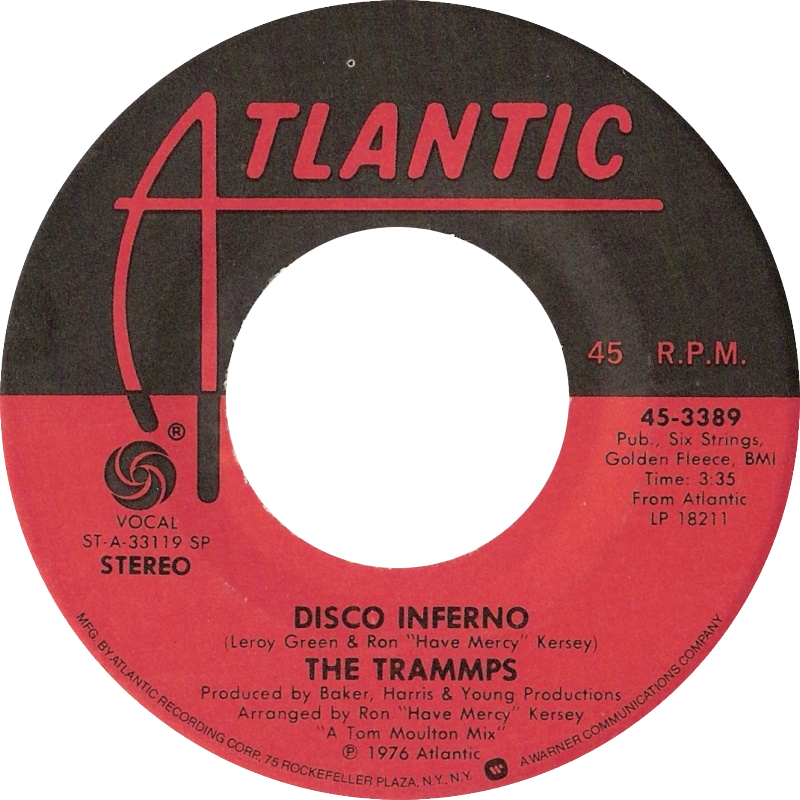
- Side A of the original 1976 US single

Single by the Trammps

from the album Disco Inferno
- B-side: "You Touch My Hot Line" (original); "That's Where the Happy People Go" (reissue)
- Released: December 28, 1976
- Recorded: 1976
- Studio: Sigma Sound, Philadelphia, Pennsylvania
- Genre: Disco
- Length: 10:59 (album version); 3:35 (radio edit)
- Label: Atlantic
- Songwriters: Leroy Green; Ron "Have Mercy" Kersey
- Producers: Ronnie Baker, Norman Harris, Earl Young

The Trammps singles chronology
"Ninety-Nine and a Half" (1976)	"Disco Inferno" (1976)	"I Feel Like I've Been Livin' (On the Dark Side of the Moon)" (1977)

Audio
- "Disco Inferno" on YouTube
- "Disco Inferno" (radio edit) on YouTube

"Disco Inferno" is a song by American disco band the Trammps from their 1976 studio album of same name. With two other cuts by the group, it reached No. 1 on the US Billboard Dance Club Songs chart in early 1977, but had limited mainstream success until 1978, after being included on the soundtrack to the 1977 film Saturday Night Fever, when a re-release hit number eleven on the Billboard Hot 100 chart.

It was also covered in 1993 by American-born singer Tina Turner on What's Love Got to Do with It, and in 1998 by American singer-songwriter Cyndi Lauper on the A Night at the Roxbury soundtrack. Among others who covered this are Damien Lovelock, Hardsonic Bottoms 3, and Vicki Shepard.

== Background and composition ==
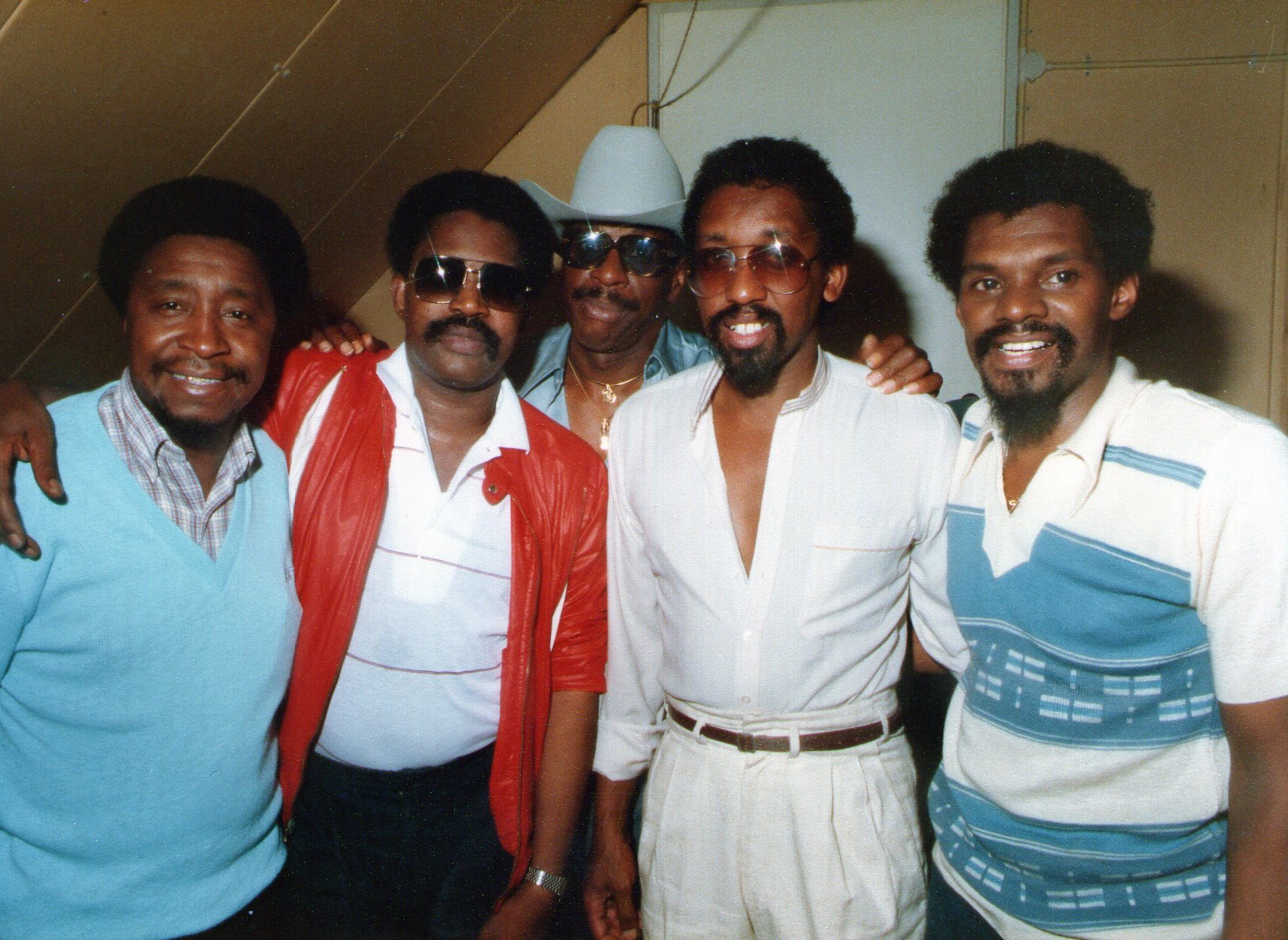
The Trammps, 1984

The song was originally recorded by the Trammps in 1976 and released as a single. It was inspired by the 1974 blockbuster film The Towering Inferno, in which a party in a top-floor ballroom is threatened by a fire that breaks out below. According to Tom Moulton, who mixed the record, the Dolby noise reduction had been set incorrectly during the mixdown of the tracks. When engineer Jay Mark discovered the error and corrected it, the mix had a much wider dynamic range than was common at the time. Because of this, the record seems to "jump out" at the listener. With "Starvin'" and "Body Contact Contract", it topped the U.S. Disco chart for six weeks in the late winter of 1977. On the other U.S. charts, "Disco Inferno" hit number nine on the Black Singles chart, but it was not initially a significant success at pop radio, peaking at number 53 on the Billboard Hot 100.

"Disco Inferno" gained much greater recognition when the nearly-11-minute album version was included on the soundtrack to the 1977 film Saturday Night Fever. Re-released by Atlantic Records, the track peaked at number 11 in the U.S. during the spring of 1978, becoming the Trammps' biggest and most recognized single. Later, it was included in the Saturday Night Fever musical, interpreted by 'DJ Monty' in the "Odissey 2001" discothèque. A cover version of the track was issued by the group Players Association in March 1978 on the Vanguard record label, both in 7" and 12" format. It was produced by Danny Weiss and also issued as a track on their 1979 LP Born to Dance.

In 2004, a 12" version with the 10:54-minute version and "Can We Come Together" (from the album Where the Happy People Go) on the B side was released in the UK. This version was certified Silver in 2021 by the British Phonographic Industry.

On September 19, 2005, "Disco Inferno" was inducted into the Dance Music Hall of Fame.

In 2009, the song was featured in Grand Theft Auto: The Ballad of Gay Tony, the second downloadable content pack for 2008's Grand Theft Auto IV, on the in-game disco radio station "K-109: The Studio". Also in 2009, at the same time as the release of The Ballad of Gay Tony, it and Grand Theft Auto IV's first downloadable pack, Grand Theft Auto IV: The Lost and Damned were packaged and released together through physical media under the title Grand Theft Auto: Episodes from Liberty City, in which the song appears in both episodes on the same radio station (the song was not present in the initial downloadable release of The Lost and Damned).

== Personnel ==
The Trammps

- Jimmy Ellis – lead vocal
- Robert Upchurch – lead and baritone vocal
- Earl Young – bass vocal
- Harold "Doc" Wade – first tenor
- Stanley Wade – second tenor

Musicians

- Ronald Baker – bass guitar
- Earl Young – drums
- Norman Harris, Bobby Eli, T. J. Tindall – guitars
- T. G. Conway – keyboards
- Don Renaldo and His Strings and Horns

== Charts ==
=== Weekly charts ===
Chart (1977)	Peak position
Canada Top Singles (RPM)	70
UK Singles (OCC)	16
US Billboard Hot 100	53
US Dance Club Songs (Billboard)	1
US Cash Box Top 100	70

Chart (1978)	Peak position
Australia (Kent Music Report)	32
Canada Top Singles (RPM)	6
New Zealand (Recorded Music NZ)	13
UK Singles (OCC)	16
US Billboard Hot 100	11
US Cash Box Top 100	8

=== Year-end charts ===
Chart (1978)	Rank
Canada Top Singles (RPM)	60
US Billboard Hot 100	54
US Cash Box Top 100	79

== Certifications ==
Region	Certification	Certified units/sales
United Kingdom (BPI) with "Can We Come Together"	Silver	200,000^{‡}
^{‡} Sales+streaming figures based on certification alone.

== Tina Turner version ==
"Disco Inferno"

Single by Tina Turner

from the album What's Love Got to Do with It
- B-side: "I Don't Wanna Fight" (single edit)
- Released: August 16, 1993
- Length: 4:03
- Label: Parlophone
- Songwriters: Leroy Green; Ron Kersey
- Producers: Tina Turner; Chris Lord-Alge; Roger Davies

Tina Turner singles chronology
"I Don't Wanna Fight" (1993)	"Disco Inferno" (1993)	"Why Must We Wait Until Tonight" (1993)

Music video
- "Disco Inferno" on YouTube

American singer and actress Tina Turner covered "Disco Inferno" for the What's Love Got to Do with It soundtrack. Released as a single in August 1993 by Parlophone, it was produced by Turner with Chris Lord-Alge and Roger Davies. It charted at number 12 on the UK Singles Chart, and reached the top 20 also in Belgium, Iceland, Ireland, and the Netherlands. The single included remixes by the Beatmasters.

=== Critical reception ===
In a 1998 retrospective review of What's Love Got to Do with It, the Daily Vault felt "Disco Inferno" "has a dated title to begin with and the arrangement's enthusiasm doesn't live up to Turner's singing". Upon the release, Alan Jones from Music Week gave the song a score of four out of five, writing, "From the woman whose interpretations are often a million miles away from the original, this is a disappointingly standard interpretation of the old Trammps hit. Having said that, it is a highly commercial song and Tina's one-of-a-kind voice has many admirers, so another big hit is in prospect."

A reviewer from People Magazine noted its "dance dramaturgy" and the "characteristic flair and energy that have made Tina the envy of every singer this side of Aretha." Sam Wood from Philadelphia Inquirer found that the "joyous, over-the-top treatment" of the disco classic "reeks of campy white polyester suits and oily sweat under a dance-floor glitter ball." Toby Anstis reviewed the song for Smash Hits, also giving it four out of five. He said, "Tina pulls off this cover really well. It's nice hearing a rauchy female rock voice like that. I think I prefer this version to the original. I'd boogie to that any time at a party. I think I'd go and see the film about her soon too. Yeah, she's great."

=== Track listings ===
- UK 7-inch and cassette; Australian cassette single
1. "Disco Inferno" (album version) – 4:03
2. "I Don't Wanna Fight" (single edit) – 4:25
- UK, European, and Australian CD single
1. "Disco Inferno" (album version) – 4:03
2. "I Don't Wanna Fight" (single edit) – 4:25
3. "Disco Inferno" (12-inch version) – 5:33
4. "Disco Inferno" (12-inch dub) – 6:57
- UK 12-inch single
1. "Disco Inferno" (12-inch version) – 5:33
2. "Disco Inferno" (12-inch dub) – 6:57
3. "Disco Inferno" (album version) – 4:03
- Australian CD single
1. "Disco Inferno" (album version) – 4:03
2. "Tina's Wish" – 3:08
3. "The Best" (single edit) – 4:08
4. "Proud Mary" – 5:25

=== Charts ===
==== Weekly charts ====
Chart (1993)	Peak position
Australia (ARIA)	56
Belgium (Ultratop 50 Flanders)	10
Europe (Eurochart Hot 100)	38
Europe (European Hit Radio)	30
Iceland (Íslenski Listinn Topp 40)	4
Ireland (IRMA)	13
Israel (Israeli Singles Chart)	25
Netherlands (Dutch Top 40)	16
Netherlands (Single Top 100)	17
New Zealand (Recorded Music NZ)	25
UK Singles (Official Charts)	12
UK Airplay (Music Week)	3

==== Year-end charts ====
Chart (1993)	Rank
Belgium (Ultratop)	94
Iceland (Íslenski Listinn Topp 40)	30
Netherlands (Dutch Top 40)	143
UK Airplay (Music Week)	31

=== Release history ===
Region	Date	Format(s)	Label(s)	Ref.
United Kingdom	August 16, 1993	7-inch vinyl; 12-inch vinyl; CD; cassette	Parlophone	
Australia	October 11, 1993	CD; cassette	Parlophone; EMI	

== Cyndi Lauper version ==
"Disco Inferno"

Single by Cyndi Lauper

from the album A Night at the Roxbury
- Released: August 3, 1999
- Recorded: 1999
- Genre: Disco
- Length: 3:18
- Label: Jellybean Records
- Songwriters: Leroy Green; Ron Kersey
- Producers: Cyndi Lauper; Mark Saunders; Jan Pulsford

Cyndi Lauper singles chronology
"Early Christmas Morning" (1998)	"Disco Inferno" (1999)	"Shine" (2001)

Audio
- "Disco Inferno" (short version) on YouTube
- "Disco Inferno" (long version) on YouTube

American singer and songwriter Cyndi Lauper performed this song live for the first time at New York, Bryant Park on June 21, 1998.

In the Billboard magazine dated May 16, 1998, in the "Dance Trax" column, there was a story on remixers Bobby Guy and Ernie Lake, aka Soul Solution: "They are working with Cyn on a chest-pounding rendition of 'Disco Inferno'. The cut will be featured on the forthcoming soundtrack to A Night At Roxbury."

Although the original release date of the maxi single was August 3, 1999, it was distributed from July 24 in some regions. The single was officially released in the U.S. in August 1999. Lauper performed it at many shows, including her Summer Tour '99, around the time of its release. The song was nominated for a Grammy in the category of 'Best Dance Recording' for the 1999 awards.

=== Official versions ===
1. Boris & Beck Roxy Edit Dub
2. Boris & Beck Roxy Dub
3. Club Mix
4. Rescue Me Mix
5. Soul Solution A Capella
6. Soul Solution Drumapella
7. Soul Solution Mix
8. Soul Solution Radio Edit

==== Accolades ====
Year	Nominee / work	Award	Result
1999	"Disco Inferno"	Grammy Award for Best Dance Recording	Nominated

=== Charts ===
Chart (1999)	Peak position
US Hot Dance Club Play (Billboard)	8
US Hot Dance Singles Sales (Billboard)	12
