= Killer Joe (Benny Golson album) =

Studio album by Benny Golson
- Released: 1977
- Recorded: 1977
- Studio: A&M, Los Angeles, California; Sigma Sound, Philadelphia, Pennsylvania
- Genre: Jazz
- Length: 55:39
- Label: Columbia; PC 34678
- Producer: Bobby Martin and Benny Golson for the Tentmakers Corporation

Benny Golson chronology
Are You Real (1977)	Killer Joe (1977)	I'm Always Dancin' to the Music (1978)

Killer Joe is an album by Benny Golson recorded in 1977 and released by the Columbia label. This was Golson's first jazz album in over a decade when his career has been devoted to writing music for television and motion pictures.

== Reception ==
Professional ratings
Review scores
Source	Rating
Allmusic	2/5 stars

The Allmusic review states, "This album broke Golson's long hiatus in America and reintroduced him to the domestic jazz audience, but it wasn't quite the hit for him as for Quincy Jones".

== Track listing ==
All compositions by Benny Golson except where noted

1. "Hesitation" (Richard Stekol) – 4:18
2. "Walkin' and Stalkin'" – 5:06
3. "Love Uprising" (Charles Collins, Bobby Martin, Dennis Harris, Michael Foreman) – 3:54
4. "The New Killer Joe Rap" (Benny Golson, Bobbie Golson) – 2:34
5. "The New Killer Joe" (Golson, Quincy Jones) – 5:38
6. "I'll Do It All With You" – 5:35
7. "Easy All Day Long" (Golson, Martin) – 6:30
8. "Timbale Rock" – 6:35
9. "Tomorrow Paradise" – 2:01

== Personnel ==
- Benny Golson – arranger, tenor saxophone, soprano saxophone, piano, Fender Rhodes, humming, vibraphone
- Al Aarons, Bobby Bryant (tracks 1–3 & 6–8), Bobby Childers, Chuck Findley (track 5) – trumpet
- Britt Woodman, Frank Rosolino, George Bohannon – trombone
- Maurice Spears – bass trombone
- Ernie Watts – alto saxophone, alto flute (tracks 1–3)
- Jerome Richardson – alto flute (track 3)
- Tyrone G. Kersey – organ, clavinet (tracks 1 & 3)
- Bobby Lyle – Fender Rhodes (tracks 2, 7 & 8)
- Roland Chambers (tracks 1, 3 & 6), Bobby Eli (tracks 1, 3 & 5), Dennis Harris (tracks 1, 3, 5 & 6), Ray Parker Jr. (tracks 2, 7 & 8), Greg Porée (tracks 6 & 7) – electric guitar
- Stanley Clarke (track 2), Scott G. Edwards (track 8), Michael "Sugie Bear" Foreman (tracks 3, 5 & 6) – bass
- Charles Collins (tracks 1, 3, 5 & 6), James Gadson (tracks 2, 7 & 8), Scott G. Edwards (track 7) – drums
- Poncho Sanchez (tracks 2, 7 & 8), Larry Washington (tracks 1, 3 & 5) – congas
- Willie Bobo – rap, timbales, claves (track 8)
- Mortonette Jenkins – vocals, backing vocals (tracks 2 & 5–7)
- Ted Lange – rap (track 4)
- Drake Frye – vocals (track 6)
- Evette Benton (tracks 1 & 3), Carla Benson (tracks 1 & 3), Linda Evans (track 7), Brenda Lucille Gooch (tracks 2 & 5), Barbara Ingram (tracks 1 & 3), Jan Ellen Jones (tracks 2 & 5) – backing vocals
- Bobby Martin – arranger (tracks 1 & 3)
