= Guilty (The Pearls song) =

1974 single by The Pearls

Single by The Pearls
- B-side: "I'll Say It Over Again"
- Released: 1 June 1974
- Genre: Pop
- Label: Bell
- Songwriters: Ron Roker, Gerry Shury

The Pearls singles chronology
"Yo Yo" (1973)	"Guilty" (1974)	"Wizard of Love" (1974)

"Guilty"

Single by First Choice

from the album The Player
- B-side: "Wake Up to Me"
- Released: 1974
- Genre: Pop, R&B
- Label: Philly Groove
- Songwriters: Ron Roker, Gerry Shury

First Choice singles chronology
"The Player (Part 1)" (1974)	"Guilty" (1974)	"Love Freeze" (1975)

"Guilty" is a 1974 song by British vocal duo The Pearls. It was the group's final charting single in the UK.

"Guilty" reached No. 10 on the UK Singles Chart, thus becoming their biggest hit.

The song was included on a 2005 compilation of the group's hits entitled, A String of Pearls.

"Guilty" was also covered by American girl group First Choice. Their version reached No. 103 in the U.S. and became a top 20 R&B hit.

== Charts ==
The Pearls

Chart (1974/76)	Peak position
Australia (Kent Music Report)	76
UK (Official Charts Company)	10

First Choice

Chart (1974)	Peak position
U.S. Billboard Hot 100	103
U.S. Billboard Best Selling Soul Singles	19
