= MFSB: The Gamble & Huff Orchestra =

Studio album by MFSB
- Released: 1978
- Recorded: 1978
- Studio: Sigma Sound, Philadelphia, Pennsylvania; Kaye-Smith Studios, Seattle, Washington
- Genre: Philadelphia soul; disco
- Length: 40:31
- Label: Philadelphia International
- Producer: Kenneth Gamble, Leon Huff, Dexter Wansel, Joseph B. Jefferson, John L. Usry, Jr., Jack Faith, Thom Bell, Dennis Harris, Michael Foreman

MFSB chronology
End of Phase I: A Collection of Greatest Hits (1977)	MFSB: The Gamble & Huff Orchestra (1978)	Mysteries Of The World (1980)

MFSB: The Gamble & Huff Orchestra is the sixth album to be released by Philadelphia International Records’ house band MFSB.

Professional ratings
Review scores
Source	Rating
Allmusic	3.5/5 stars

== Track listing ==
1. "Dance with Me Tonight" (Cynthia Biggs, Dexter Wansel) 5:08
2. "To Be In Love" (Joseph Jefferson) 5:48
3. "Let's Party Down" (Leroy Bell, Casey James) 5:56
4. "Wishing on a Star" (Billie Calvin) 5:39
5. "Use Ta Be My Guy" (Kenneth Gamble, Leon Huff) 5:15
6. "The Way I Feel Today" (Kenneth Gamble, Leon Huff) 4:35
7. "Is It Something I Said" (Leroy Bell, Casey James, Thom Bell) 3:58
8. "Redwood Beach" (Dennis Harris) 4:13

== Personnel ==
- Barbara Ingram, Leroy Bell, Casey James, Bill Lamb, Carla Benson, Evette Benton - backing vocals
- Anthony Bell - guitar
- Leroy Bell - guitar, percussion
- Casey James - percussion, synthesizer

== Charts ==
=== Singles ===
Year	Single	Chart positions
Year	Single	US R&B
1978	"Use Ta Be My Guy"	94
