= Greatest Disco Hits: Music For Non-Stop Dancing =

Greatest Disco Hits: Music for Non-Stop Dancing

Greatest hits album by The Salsoul Orchestra
- Released: 1978
- Studios: Sigma Sound, Philadelphia, Pennsylvania
- Genre: Disco
- Length: 35:07
- Label: Salsoul Records
- Producer: Vincent Montana Jr.

The Salsoul Orchestra chronology
How Deep Is Your Love (1978)	Greatest Disco Hits: Music for Non-Stop Dancing (1978)	Street Sense (1979)

Greatest Disco Hits: Music for Non-Stop Dancing is an album released by the Salsoul Orchestra in 1978 on Salsoul Records (LP record SA 8508). It is noted for its pioneering use of slip-cueing, known at the time as “disco blending,” a phrase coined by Walter Gibbons.

== Reception ==
Prior to landing on the charts, the album had been reviewed as a “perfect party record” by Billboard magazine. Greatest Disco Hits entered the Billboard 200 album charts on September 9, 1978, and remained there for 13 weeks; it peaked at #97 and was the group's last album to break the top 100.

== Track listing ==
All tracks are written by Vincent Montana Jr. except where noted.

No.	Title	Writer(s)	Length
1.	"Salsoul: 3001 (Introduction)"		1:03
2.	"Nice ‘n' Naasty"		4:17
3.	"Getaway"	Peter Cor, Beloyd Taylor	2:33
4.	"You're Just the Right Size"		3:04
5.	"Chicago Bus Stop (Ooh, I Love It)"		2:46
6.	"Tangerine"	Johnny Mercer, Victor Schertzinger	2:19
7.	"Salsoul Hustle"		3:16
8.	"Magic Bird of Fire"		3:04
9.	"It's Good for the Soul"		2:30
10.	"Salsoul Rainbow"		2:01
11.	"Don't Beat Around the Bush"		2:48
12.	"Salsoul: 3001"		5:26
Total length:			35:07

Notes

- "Salsoul: 3001" adapted by Montana from Richard Strauss' Also sprach Zarathustra
