= Run Away (Salsoul Orchestra song) =

Single by Salsoul Orchestra featuring Loleatta Holloway

from the album Magic Journey
- B-side: "Album Version/Full Version"
- Released: 1977
- Recorded: 1976
- Genre: Disco, R&B, soul
- Length: 4:44 (Album version/B-side track single); 2:30 (A-side single version)
- Label: Salsoul
- Songwriter(s): Vincent Montana Jr., Ronnie James, Janice Gugliuzza
- Producer(s): Vincent Montana Jr.

"Run Away" is a 1977 disco single written by Ronnie James and Vincent Montana, Jr. and performed by the Salsoul Orchestra with featured vocals by Loleatta Holloway. The single was from the band's Magic Journey album. Along with the tracks, "Magic Bird of Fire", and "Getaway", "Run Away" went to #3 on the US disco chart. On the soul chart, "Run Away" peaked at #84.

== Cover Versions ==
- In 1997, Nuyorican Soul covered the song, with featured vocals by La India. This version went to number one on the US dance charts.
- In 2009, British proto-goth-jazz singer Bobby Klang took his version to number 88 in the Belgian charts.

== See also ==
- List of number-one dance singles of 1997 (U.S.)
