= Slipping Out =

Studio album by The Trammps
- Released: 1980
- Studio: Atlantic, New York City
- Genre: Disco
- Length: 38:05
- Label: Atlantic
- Producer: Mass Production

The Trammps chronology
Mixin' It Up (1980)	Slipping Out (1980)	This One Is for the Party (1984)

Professional ratings
Review scores
Source	Rating
AllMusic	2.5/5 stars

Slipping Out is the eighth studio album by American soul-disco group, The Trammps, released in 1980 through Atlantic Records. The album and the singles "Looking for You" and "Breathtaking View" all failed to chart.

== Track listing ==
Side one
No.	Title	Writer(s)	Length
1.	"Loveland"	Gregory McCoy	4:36
2.	"Trained-Eye"	LeCoy Bryant, Ricardo Williams, James Drumgole	5:40
3.	"Mellow Out"	Tyrone Williams, James Drumgole	4:06
4.	"Groove All Mighty"	Gregory McCoy, James Drumgole	3:50

Side two
No.	Title	Writer(s)	Length
5.	"Looking for You"	Tyrone Williams, Ricardo Williams	4:30
6.	"Our Thought (Slipping Away)"	Agnes Kelly, Larry Marshall, LeCoy Bryant, Kevin Douglas, Tyrone Williams, Ricardo Williams, Emmanuel Redding, Gregory McCoy, James Drumgole	1:05
7.	"I Don't Want to Ever Lose Your Love"	Tyrone Williams, Ricardo Williams	4:31
8.	"Is There Any Room for Me"	Larry Marshall, LeCoy Bryant, Ricardo Williams	5:33
9.	"Breathtaking View"	Emmanuel Redding, James Drumgole	3:49

== Personnel ==
The Trammps

- Jimmy Ellis
- Robert Upchurch
- Earl Young
- Stanley Wade
- Harold Wade

Additional personnel

- LeCoy Bryant – lead guitar, rhythm guitar
- Danny Harrs – guitar solo on "Is There Any Room for Me"
- Kevin Douglas – bass guitar
- Emanuel Redding – percussion
- James Drumgole – trumpet, flugelhorn
- Gregory McCoy – soprano saxophone, alto saxophone, tenor saxophone, Fender Rhodes piano, Clavinet, string ensemble, ARP Omni II, Prophet 5 synthesizer
- Samuel Williams – drums on "Looking for You" and "Our Thought (Slipping Away)"
- Ricardo Williams – drums, string ensemble, Prophet 5 synthesizer
- Tyrone Williams – Yamaha grand piano, Fender Rhodes electric piano, Yamaha electric grand piano, Clavinet, Korg bass synthesizer, string ensemble, ARP Omni II, Minimoog, Prophet 5 keyboards, all keyboard solos
