= Salsoul Orchestra =

Backing band of session musicians

- Origin: New York City, U.S.
- Genres: Dance, soul, disco, pop
- Years active: 1974–1983
- Label: Salsoul Records
- Past members: Vincent Montana Jr. Ronnie Baker; Gordon Edwards; Bobby Eli; Dennis Harris; Norman Harris; Larry Washington; Earl Young

The Salsoul Orchestra was the backing band of session musicians for many acts on the New York City label Salsoul Records and, under its own name, recorded several hit singles and albums between 1975 and 1982.

== History ==
The orchestra was formed in 1974 and was disbanded in 1982. Their music featured elements of Philadelphia soul, funk, Latin and disco. The Salsoul Orchestra included up to 50 members and was created and masterminded for Salsoul Records by Philadelphia musician Vincent Montana, Jr. Montana wrote, arranged, conducted, produced and played on all of the orchestra's tracks until 1978, including a gold-selling Christmas album.

The Salsoul Orchestra initially consisted of many of the original members of Philadelphia International's MFSB, who had moved to Salsoul as the result of a disagreement with producers Kenny Gamble and Leon Huff over finances. Other members began performing as the Ritchie Family and as John Davis and the Monster Orchestra. Many large disco orchestras became popular at around the same time, including Philly's MFSB. Some may say that there were many similarities between the Salsoul Orchestra and MFSB, with whom Vincent Montana also worked. However, the Salsoul Orchestra was more of a string-based sound while MFSB was a bit more big band in nature with five saxophones, which to Montana never sounded quite right and which he omitted from Salsoul's lineup with the exception of the baritone sax. The orchestra's biggest chart singles were 1976's reworked version of the standard "Tangerine" (pop #18, R&B #36) and "Nice 'N' Naasty" (R&B #20, pop #30) later in the same year.

When Montana left Salsoul, the orchestra recorded a final album at Sigma Sound Studios in Philadelphia mainly with producer Bunny Sigler. The orchestra's last three albums were recorded in New York City with local session players and producers, including Patrick Adams and Tom Moulton.

The orchestra's track "Love Break (Ooh I Love It)" has been sampled in rap songs such as 50 Cent's "Candy Shop" and Eric B & Rakim's "Paid in Full". Also Madonna's "Vogue" used samples of the track, the inclusion of which was later the subject of a lawsuit that ended in Madonna's favor.

From December 24, 1977, to 1986, the song "Salsoul 3001" (whose intro sequence is based on Richard Strauss' "Also sprach Zarathustra") was used in the Soviet TV game What? Where? When?

== Discography ==
=== Studio albums ===
Year	Album	Peak chart positions			Record label
Year	Album	US	US R&B	CAN	Record label
1975	The Salsoul Orchestra	14	20	47	Salsoul
1976	Nice 'n' Naasty	61	23	—	Salsoul
1976	Christmas Jollies	—	38	—	Salsoul
1977	Magic Journey	61	51	—	Salsoul
1977	Cuchi-Cuchi (with Charo)	100	—	—	Salsoul
1978	Up the Yellow Brick Road	117	52	—	Salsoul
1978	How Deep Is Your Love	—	—	—	Salsoul
1979	Street Sense	—	—	—	Salsoul
1979	How High	201	—	—	Salsoul
1981	Christmas Jollies II	170	—	—	Salsoul
1982	Heat It Up	—	—	—	Salsoul
"—" denotes a recording that did not chart or was not released in that territory.

=== Compilation albums ===
Year	Album	Peak	Record label
Year	Album	US	Record label
1978	Greatest Disco Hits: Music For Non-Stop Dancing	97	Salsoul
1994	Anthology	—	Salsoul
2005	The Anthology	—	Suss'd
2010	The Salsoul Orchestra Story: 35th Anniversary Collection	—	Groove Line
"—" denotes a recording that did not chart or was not released in that territory.

=== Singles ===
Year	Title	Peak chart positions					
Year	Title	US	US R&B	US Dan	CAN	NL	UK
1975	"I Just Can't Give You Up" (with Floyd Smith)	—	—	—	—	—	—
1975	"Salsoul Hustle"	76	44	4	—	—	—
1976	"Tangerine"	18	36	4	21	21	—
1976	"You're Just the Right Size"	88	76	4	—	—	—
1976	"Nice 'n' Naasty"	30	20	3	87	—	—
1977	"Ritzy Mambo"	99	—	3	—	—	—
1977	"Short Shorts"	106	—	—	—	—	—
1977	"Getaway"	—	33	3	—	—	—
1977	"Run Away" (featuring Loleatta Holloway)	—	84	3	—	—	—
1977	"Magic Bird of Fire"	—	—	3	—	—	—
1977	"Dance a Little Bit Closer" (with Charo)	104	—	18	—	—	44
1977	"We Wish You a Merry Christmas"	—	—	—	—	—	—
1978	"West Side Encounter" / "West Side Story" (medley)	—	68	13	—	—	—
1978	"Ease On down the Road"	—	—	13	—	—	—
1978	"Fiddler on the Roof" (medley)	—	—	13	—	—	—
1978	"Sgt. Pepper's Lonely Hearts Club Band"	—	—	—	—	—	—
1978	"The Little Drummer Boy"	—	—	—	—	—	—
1979	"Sun After the Rain"	—	—	—	—	—	—
1979	"Street Sense"	—	—	40	—	—	—
1979	"212 North 12th"	—	—	40	—	—	—
1979	"How High" (featuring Cognac)	105	66	21	—	—	—
1981	"Deck the Halls"	—	—	—	—	—	—
1982	"Take Some Time Out (For Love)"	—	52	46	—	—	—
1982	"Seconds" (featuring Loleatta Holloway)	—	—	22	—	—	—
1983	"Ooh, I Love It (Love Break)"	—	—	19	—	—	83
"—" denotes a recording that did not chart or was not released in that territory.

== See also ==
- Booker T. & the M.G.'s
- The Funk Brothers
- The J.B.'s
- Tower of Power horn section
- The Wrecking Crew
- Prelude Records
- Salsa
