= The Players Association =

New York-based studio group

- Origin: New York City, U.S.
- Genres: Disco
- Years active: 1977–1981

The Players Association was a New York-based studio group, put together by drummer/arranger Chris Hills and producer Danny Weiss in 1977 on Vanguard Records.

== Overview ==
The Players Association recordings brought in leading jazz session musicians such as Joe Farrell, David Sanborn, James Mtume, Bob Berg, Mike Mandel, synthesist Marcus Barone, and Lorraine Moore on vocals as well as others. Whilst writing some of their own songs, the group mainly focused on covers. Their two biggest hits were a cover of the Trammps tune "Disco Inferno" and their own composition "Turn the Music Up!" Both tracks were released on the Vanguard label and issued in the UK as 12-inch singles.

"Disco Inferno" was an underground club hit in the United States and the United Kingdom, and was most notable for the solos from trumpeter Jon Faddis, and Michael Brecker and David Sanborn on tenor and alto sax. The band proved more popular in the UK, where they scored three chart singles, including "Turn the Music Up!", which reached number 8 in the UK Singles Chart, and one chart album, which also prompted a British tour. Their other minor hit singles were "Ride the Groove" (released in the UK in 1979), which reached number 42 in the UK chart, and "We Got the Groove" (released in the UK in 1980), which peaked at number 61. After the release of five albums between 1977 and 1981, the association ended.

== Discography ==
=== Albums ===
Year	Album	UK
1977	The Players Association	—
1977	Born to Dance	—
1979	Turn the Music Up	54
1980	We Got the Groove	—
1981	Let Your Body Go	—
"—" denotes releases that did not chart.

=== Singles ===
Year	Single	Peak chart positions		
Year	Single	US Dance	US R&B	UK
1977	"Goin' to the Disco"	―	―	―
1977	"Disco Inferno"	―	―	―
1977	"Love Hangover"	24	―	―
1977	"We Were Born to Dance"	―	―	―
1979	"Turn the Music Up!"	56	―	8
1979	"Ride the Groove"	―	―	42
1980	"We Got the Groove"	18	―	61
1980	"The Get-Down Mellow Sound"	―	59	―
1980	"We're Almost There"	―	―	―
1981	"Let Your Body Go!"	―	―	―
1981	"The Things You Get Me to Do"	―	―	―
"—" denotes releases that did not chart or were not released.
