= Christmas Jollies =

Studio album by The Salsoul Orchestra
- Released: November 1976
- Studios: Sigma Sound, Philadelphia, Pennsylvania
- Genres: Christmas; disco
- Length: 37:56
- Label: Salsoul
- Producer: Vincent Montana Jr.

The Salsoul Orchestra chronology
Nice N' Naasty (1976)	Christmas Jollies (1976)	Cuchi-Cuchi (1977)

Professional ratings
Review scores
Source	Rating
Sounds	1/5 stars

Christmas Jollies is the third album released by the Salsoul Orchestra and their first Christmas album. It was recorded and released on Salsoul Records in November 1976. The album includes a few new Christmas tunes, co-written by Vincent Montana Jr. entitled, "There's Someone Who's Knocking" with the children's chorus singing, "Merry Christmas All" with his daughter, Denise Montana, singing the lead and "Christmas Time" with the sweet honeyed-voices of the session girl-group, The Sweethearts of Sigma, that features group members Barbara Ingram, Evette Benton and Carla Benson. This highly successful album also includes disco renditions of "The Little Drummer Boy", "Sleigh Ride" and so on, plus the orchestrated instrumental version of "Silent Night". Side two is semi-instrumental with two different medleys, such as "Christmas Medley" with the family chorus singing and "New Year's Medley" with The Salsoul Singers singing in the background. Christmas Jollies went on to become one of the best-selling holiday albums of 1976 and 1977.

== Track listing ==
All tracks are written by Vincent Montana Jr., except where noted.

Side one
No.	Title	Writer(s)	Length
1.	"The Little Drummer Boy"	Katherine Kennicott Davis	4:57
2.	"Sleigh Ride"	Mitchell Parish, Leroy Anderson	3:03
3.	"Silent Night" (Instrumental)	Joseph Mohr, Franz Xaver Gruber	1:05
4.	"Merry Christmas All" (sung by Denise Montana)		3:28
5.	"Christmas Time"		3:59
6.	"There's Someone Who's Knocking"		2:30

Side two
No.	Title	Length
1.	"Christmas Medley^{[a]}"	12:08
2.	"New Year's Medley^{[b]}"	6:46

Notes

- ^{^a}Contains renditions of "Joy to the World", "Deck the Halls", "O Holy Night", "O Come, All Ye Faithful", "Jingle Bells", "Hark! The Herald Angels Sing", "Santa Claus Is Comin' to Town", "The Christmas Song", "White Christmas", "Rudolph the Red-Nosed Reindeer", "I'll Be Home for Christmas", "Winter Wonderland", "The First Noel" and "We Wish You a Merry Christmas"
- ^{^b}Contains renditions of "Auld Lang Syne", "I'm Looking Over a Four Leaf Clover", "Alabama Jubilee", "Oh, Dem Golden Slippers" and "God Bless America"

== Personnel ==
- Keyboards - Carlton Kent
- Bass - Gordon Edwards
- Drums - Earl Young
- Congas - Larry Washington, Osvaldo Martinez
- Alto Saxophone - John Bonnie on "We Wish You a Merry Christmas" and "There's Someone Who's Knocking"
- Trumpet Solos by Evan Solot on "We Wish You a Merry Christmas"
- Guitars - Ronnie James, Norman Harris
- Banjo - Ronnie James
- Strings & Horns - Don Renaldo and His Little Helpers
- Tuba - Eddie Moore
- Vibes, Chimes, Marimba, Timpani, Percussion, Bells, Producer - Vincent Montana, Jr.
- Vocals - The Sweethearts of Sigma: Barbara Ingram, Evette Benton, Carla Benson (tracks A1, A2 and A5)
