= Dennis Harris (musician) =

American guitarist, music arranger and songwriter

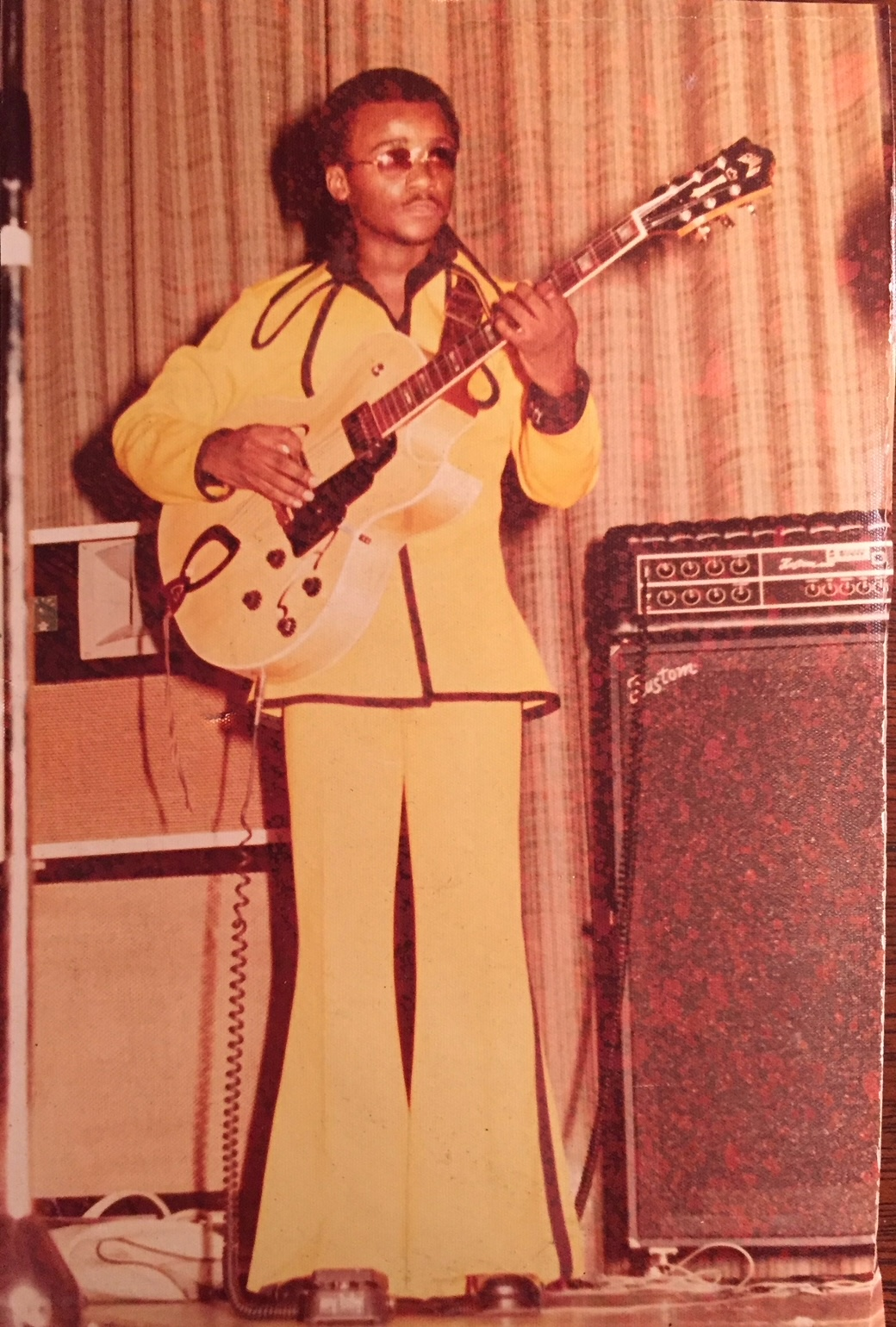

Background information
- Born: Dennis W. Harris; United States
- Genres: R&B, soul, jazz, funk, Philadelphia soul, disco
- Occupations: Studio musician, bandleader, music teacher
- Instruments: Guitar
- Years active: 1970s–present
- Label: Philadelphia International
- Member of: The New MFSB™
- Formerly of: Eli's Second Coming, MFSB, The Philly Groove Orchestra, The Salsoul Orchestra, The Trammps

Dennis Harris is an American session guitarist, songwriter and arranger. Historically he played a significant part in the Philly Sound, playing on many of the hits during the 1970s. The hits include, "Only the Strong Survive" by Billy Paul, "Ain't No Stoppin' Us Now" by McFadden & Whitehead and "Lady Love" by Lou Rawls. He also played the guitar intro on Rawls' hit "You'll Never Find Another Love like Mine". He is a former member of The Philly Groove Orchestra, The Trammps, MFSB and The Salsoul Orchestra. In recent years he has been part of the New MFSB. He is also a guitar teacher.

== Background ==
Harris joined former Volcanos members which included Jimmy Ellis and became a member of The Trammps which also included Ron Kersey on keyboards, John Hart on organ, Stanley Wade on bass and Michael Thompson on drums. He was the original lead guitarist for the group.

His guitar can be heard on the song "Ain't No Stoppin' Us Now" by McFadden & Whitehead which was a hit in 1979. Along with Bobby Eli, Tommy Bell, Jimmy Williams, and Earl Young, Harris' importance was acknowledged.

With a master's degree in business, Harris has had two concurrent careers, music and banking. He is also a 2016 Musicians Hall of Fame inductee.

== Career ==
Dennis Harris's career really took off in the 1970s when he was playing guitar for the Delfonics. In 1975 he was taken into the studio by the lead singer and he became part of the scene.

He wrote and handled the arrangement and was co-producer for the song "Redwood Beach" which was the B side for MFSB's 1977 single, "Use ta Be My Guy". Another release that year was the Killer Joe album by Benny Golson. Harris played on five of the album's tracks and co-composed the track "Love Uprising". He co-produced the MFSB 1978 album, and was lead guitarist on Wishing on a Star,MFSB: The Gamble & Huff Orchestra which was released in 1978. His guitar line opens up the "There's No Other Like You" which was the B side for Melba Moore's hit "You Stepped Into My Life". He arranged the song "That's Not Part of the Show" which appeared on the 1979 Love Talk album by The Manhattans which got to #20 on the soul chart, and #141 on the pop chart. He played on Leon Huff's solo album, Here to Create Music which was released in 1980.

In February, 2019, he was interviewed on the Doris Hall-James Indie Show. He talked about MFSB as well as his playing the intro on Lou Rawls' hit "You'll Never Find Another Love like Mine". He and In June, he again he was interviewed on The Doris Hall-James Indie Show. He and fellow musician, Jimmy Williams and they talked about his cousin Norman Harris.

In July, 2019, he played at the Philly Beats event which was facilitated by Philadelphia Clef Club of Jazz & Performing Arts.

== Discography ==
Album sessions (selective)
Act	Release	Catalogue	Year	Role	Notes #
Dee Dee Sharp	Happy 'bout The Whole Thing	TSOP PZ 3389	1975	Guitar	
Sound Experience	Boogie Woogie	Buddah Records BDS 5645	1975	Lead guitar	
The Trammps	Trammps	Golden Fleece KZ 33163	1975	Lead guitar	
Don Covay	Travelin' In Heavy Traffic	Philadelphia International Records PZ 33958	1976	Guitar	
The Ritchie Family	Life Is Music	Marlin 2203	1977	Guitar	
Lou Rawls	When You Hear Lou, You've Heard It All	Philadelphia International Records PIR 82402	1977	Guitar	

== Links ==
- AllMusic, Credits, Dennis Harris
- Discogs, Dennis Harris
- jaxta | Official Music Credits - Dennis Harris
- Metason, ArtistInfo, Dennis Harris

=== Interviews ===
- The Doris Hall-James Indie Show, February 2, 2019 Musical Journey's of Dennis Harris
  Note: Sound doesn't come on until 2:10
- The Doris Hall-James Indie Show, Jun 18, 2019
