= First Choice (group) =

American girl group and vocal music trio

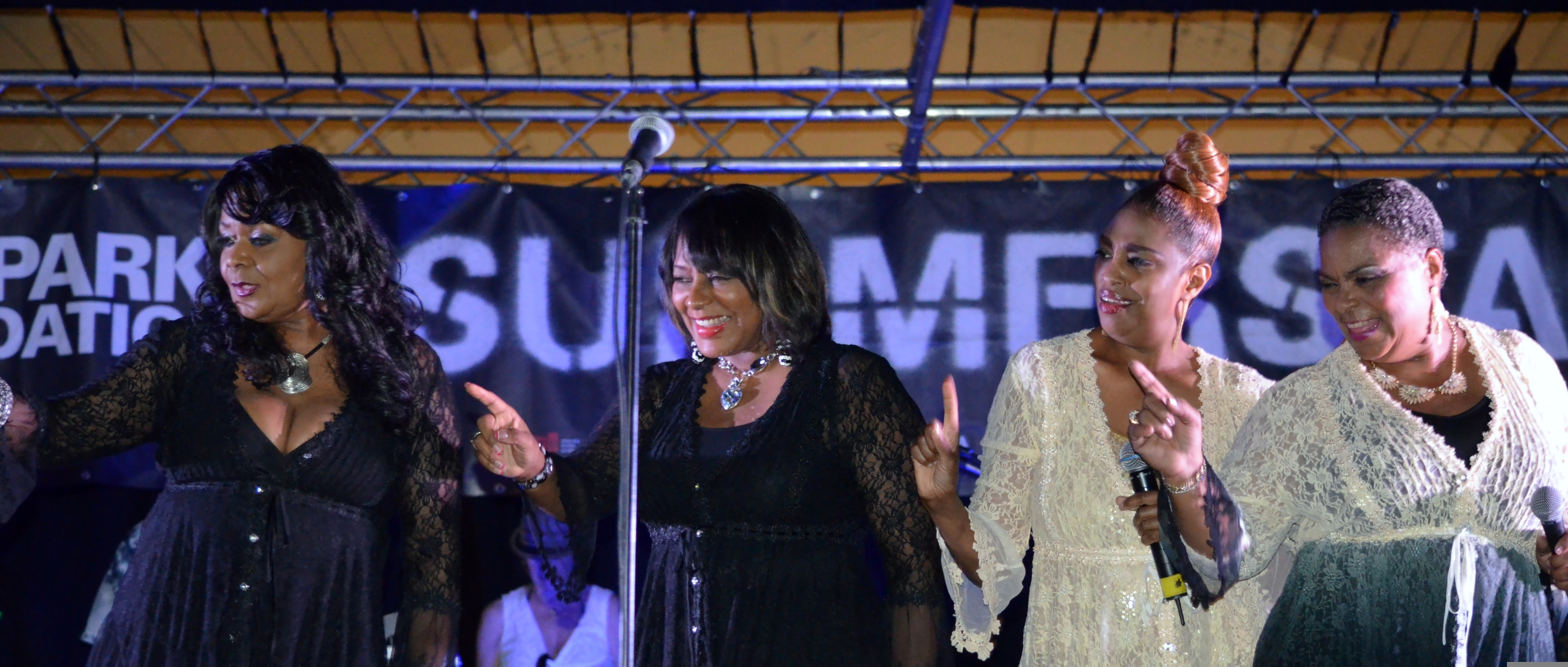

Background information
- Origin: Philadelphia, Pennsylvania, U.S.
- Genres: Soul; R&B; disco
- Years active: 1971–1980; 2014–present
- Labels: Philly Groove; Gold Mind; Warner Bros. Records; Salsoul
- Members: Annette Guest; Wardell Piper; Joyce Jones; Ursula Herring; Debbie Martin
- Past members: Rochelle Fleming

First Choice is an American girl group and vocal music trio from Philadelphia. Their soul and disco hits included "Armed and Extremely Dangerous", "Smarty Pants", "The Player (Part 1)", "Guilty", "Love Thang", and "Doctor Love". They were signed to soul label Philly Groove and to disco label Gold Mind, and later to Warner Bros. and Salsoul.

== Career ==
First Choice began singing in high school as the Debonettes. The group consisted of lead singer Rochelle Fleming, Annette Guest, and Wardell Piper. They performed in clubs after school in and around Philadelphia. They were introduced to record man Norman Harris by radio DJ Georgie Woods. Harris produced their first single "This Is the House Where Love Died". The single failed to chart nationally but was played in Philadelphia and dance club across the U.S. Their next release was "Armed and Extremely Dangerous". The single quickly became an R&B top 11 hit in early 1973 and making the UK top 20.

Wardell Piper quit the group to go solo before their first album was released, and is not pictured on the sleeve although she did sing on the album. She was replaced by singer Joyce Jones. Their new hit enabled the group to get national exposure on TV shows such as Dinah, Soul Train, and American Bandstand. Other R&B hits followed. "Smarty Pants" went to number 25 R&B and became the group's biggest UK single reaching number 9 in the UK Singles Chart, "Newsy Neighbors" and "The Player" which became their biggest R&B hit peaking at number 7.

The band switched labels in 1976 to Warner Bros. Records. Jones left the group and was replaced by Ursula Herring. At Warner's they recorded dance floor hits including "Gotta Get Away From You Baby", "Ain't He Bad" and the album title song, "So Let Us Entertain You". In 1977, the trio switched labels again this time recording for their producer Norman Harris' label, Gold Mind Records, where they got their biggest dance single, the infectious "Doctor Love". The single was from their album, Delusions, that AllMusic critic Ed Hogan regarded as the trio's best LP. The next release came in March 1979 called Hold Your Horses. Ursula Herring left and was replaced by Debbie Martin. The LP contained the dance hits "Love Thang", "Double Cross" and the title track "Hold Your Horses".

The trio officially disbanded in 1980 however, in 1983, Salsoul Records released "Let No Man Put Asunder" from their 1977 album, Delusions. That single rose to number 13 on the Billboard dance chart and has become the group's signature song and still a current favorite on the house music scene.

Fleming continued to record and perform internationally as a solo artist. Annette Guest became a successful songwriter writing for artists such as Stephanie Mills.

== Legacy and re-union ==
The group was influential to early house and techno music, because of sampling by many artists, including Todd Terry and the Jungle Brothers, mostly from First Choice's 1977 track, "Let No Man Put Asunder". The track was also covered by Mary J. Blige on her 1999 album, Mary.

On August 6, 2014, First Choice performed a reunion concert at East River Bandshell, New York City, with original members Rochelle Fleming, Annette Guest, Wardell Piper and Ursula Herring. The concert featured many of the group's ex-label mates from Salsoul Records. The group is still performing, but without Rochelle Fleming. Annette Guest and Ursula Herring, along with Andre Jackson, are currently performing as The First Choice.

In 2019, rapper J. Cole sampled their song "Wake Up to Me" in his song "Middle Child".

Fleming died on November 5, 2026, at the age of 72.

== Members timeline ==
| 1971–1973 | 1973–1975 | 1975–1979 | 1979–1980 |
| Rochelle Fleming | Rochelle Fleming | Rochelle Fleming | Rochelle Fleming |
| Annette Guest | Annette Guest | Annette Guest | Annette Guest |
| Wardell Piper | Joyce Jones | Ursula Herring | Debbie Martin |

== Discography ==
=== Studio albums ===
| Year | Title | Peak chart positions | | Record label |
| Year | Title | US | US R&B | Record label |
|---|---|---|---|---|
| 1973 | Armed and Extremely Dangerous | 184 | 55 | Philly Groove |
| 1974 | The Player | 143 | 36 | Philly Groove |
| 1976 | So Let Us Entertain You | 204 | 53 | Warner Bros./Philly Groove |
| 1977 | Delusions | 103 | — | Gold Mind |
| 1979 | Hold Your Horses | 135 | 58 | Gold Mind |
| 1980 | Breakaway | — | — | Gold Mind |
"—" denotes a recording that did not chart or was not released in that territory.

=== Compilation albums ===
- The Best of the First Choice (1976, Kory)
- Greatest Hits (1992, Salsoul)
- Philly Golden Classics (1994, Collectables)
- The Best of First Choice (1994, Southbound)
- Greatest Hits (1996, The Right Stuff)
- The Best of First Choice (1997, Charly)
- The Best of First Choice: Armed & Extremely Dangerous (1999, Philly Groove)
- The Ultimate Club Collection (2001, Philly Groove/The Right Stuff/Capitol/EMI)
- The Anthology (2005, Suss'd)
- The Greatest Hits: It's Not Over (2006, Koch)
- The Best of First Choice (2007, Metro Doubles)

=== Singles ===
| Year | Title | Peak chart positions | | | | | | | Album |
| Year | Title | US | US R&B | US Dan | AUS | CAN | NLD | UK | Album |
|---|---|---|---|---|---|---|---|---|---|
| 1972 | "This Is the House (Where Love Died)" | — | — | — | — | — | — | — | Armed and Extremely Dangerous |
| 1973 | "Armed and Extremely Dangerous" | 28 | 11 | — | — | 55 | — | 16 | Armed and Extremely Dangerous |
| 1973 | "Smarty Pants" | 56 | 25 | — | 99 | — | — | 9 | Armed and Extremely Dangerous |
| 1974 | "Newsy Neighbors" | 97 | 35 | — | — | — | — | — | Armed and Extremely Dangerous |
| 1974 | "The Player (Part 1)" | 70 | 7 | — | — | 68 | — | 59 (Note: Chart position is from the official UK "Breakers List".) | The Player |
| 1974 | "Guilty" | 103 | 19 | — | — | — | — | — | The Player |
| 1975 | "Love Freeze" | — | 61 | — | — | — | — | — | —N/a |
| 1976 | "First Choice Theme" / "Ain't He Bad" (medley) | — | — | 7 | — | — | — | — | So Let Us Entertain You |
| 1976 | "Are You Ready for Me?" | — | — | 7 | — | — | — | — | So Let Us Entertain You |
| 1976 | "Gotta Get Away (From You Baby)" | — | 64 | 16 | — | — | — | — | So Let Us Entertain You |
| 1976 | "Let Him Go" | — | 97 | — | — | — | — | — | So Let Us Entertain You |
| 1977 | "Doctor Love" | 41 | 23 | 8 | — | — | 28 | — | Delusions |
| 1977 | "Love Having You Around" | — | 68 | — | — | — | — | — | Delusions |
| 1979 | "Hold Your Horses" | — | 73 | 5 | — | — | — | — | Hold Your Horses |
| 1979 | "Double Cross" | 104 | 60 | — | — | — | — | — | Hold Your Horses |
| 1979 | "Love Thang" | — | — | 52 | — | — | — | — | Hold Your Horses |
| 1980 | "Breakaway" | — | — | 80 | — | — | — | — | Breakaway |
| 1983 | "Let No Man Put Asunder" | — | — | 13 | — | — | 47 | — | Delusions |
| 1984 | "Doctor Love" (Special Remix) | — | — | 61 | — | — | — | — | —N/a |
| 1997 | "Armed and Extremely Dangerous" (1997 Remixes) | — | — | — | — | — | — | 88 | —N/a |
| 1999 | "Doctor Love" (remixes) | — | — | 22 | — | — | — | — | —N/a |
| 2001 | "The Player" (remixes) | — | — | 7 | — | — | — | — | —N/a |
| 2002 | "Ain't He Bad" (remixes) | — | — | — | — | — | — | 89 | —N/a |
"—" denotes a recording that did not chart or was not released in that territory.
