= T. J. Tindall =

American guitarist (1950–2016)

- Born: Thomas Joshua Tindall; 1950
- Died: January 26, 2016 (aged 65–66)
- Occupation: Musician
- Instrument: Guitar
- Formerly of: MFSB; Duke Williams and The Extremes

Thomas Joshua Tindall (1950 – January 26, 2016) was an American guitarist. He was a member of MFSB and played on 38 gold and platinum funk and R&B records and more than 30 hits produced by Gamble and Huff in the 1970s and 1980s. Tindall is considered one of the architects of the Philadelphia Sound. He was inducted twice into the Philadelphia Music Alliance's Walk of Fame as a member of MFSB and the Salsoul Orchestra.

T. J. Tindall was born in 1950 in Trenton, New Jersey. During his career, Tindall played on hits produced by "Sound of Philadelphia" architects Kenneth Gamble and Leon Huff for artists such as The O'Jays' Travelin' at the Speed of Thought, Teddy Pendergrass, Harold Melvin and the Blue Notes, the Intruders, and The Three Degrees' album International. He also backed up and recorded with Bonnie Raitt (her album Give It Up), Lon & Derrek Van Eaton (their album Brother), the Jacksons, Robert Palmer's Double Fun, The Temptations, to name a few. He can be heard on The Trammps' 1976 hit "Disco Inferno" (US #46) and their album of the same name, Lou Rawls' "You'll Never Find Another Love Like Mine" (US #2), The Jackson 5's 1976 hit "Enjoy Yourself" (US #6, US R&B #2), Eddie Kendricks's "He's a Friend" single (US #36) and album of the same name and album Goin' Up In Smoke, Phyllis Hyman's album Prime of My Life, Loleatta Holloway's album Loleatta, Double Exposure's album Ten Percent, First Choice's album Delusions.

In the 1980s, Tindall retired from music, running a company in Princeton founded by his father. In 2012, he went back to the studio to join David Uosikkinen's project In The Pocket: Essential Songs of Philadelphia.

Tindall died of cancer in 2016 at age 65.

In 2016, Tindall was inducted into the Musicians Hall of Fame and Museum.
