= Duke Williams (musician) =

American musician

- Genres: R&B, rock
- Occupation: Music
- Instrument: Organ
- Years active: 1970s - ?
- Labels: Capricorn
- Formerly of: Duke Williams and the Extremes, The Chambers Brothers Band

Duke Williams is an American musician, who fronted the musical group Duke Williams and the Extremes. He was also a member of The Chambers Brothers Band.

== Background ==
Williams led his group, Duke Williams & The Extremes which in early 1974 was made up of himself on organ and vocals, Bob Hartnagle on guitar, Cotton Kent on piano and vocals, T. J. Tindall on guitar and vocals, Tommy Huff on bass, Charles Collins on drums and Earl Scooter on vocals. At some stage, a drummer, Corey Spags aka Corey Spagnolo was a member.

The Duke Williams and the Extremes' song "Chinese Chicken" was featured on the breakbeat compilation Ultimate Breaks and Beats. Richie Sambora played with Williams before forming Bon Jovi.

The band released two albums on Capricorn Records in the 1970s, including A Monkey in a Silk Suit Is Still a Monkey (1973).

Williams still plays with various bands in and around the Trenton, New Jersey area.

== Career ==
=== 1970s ===
==== A Monkey in a Silk Suit Is Still a Monkey ====
The Duke Williams and The Extremes album, A Monkey in a Silk Suit Is Still a Monkey was released on Capricorn CP 0119. It was reviewed in the 29 September 1973 issue of Billboard, where it was a Pop Pick. The reviewer began with "This album grows on you" and said that it warranted considerable spins on the turntable. The picks were, "Slippin' and Slidin'", "Clouds" and "I'm For Ready for You". The album was also an FM Action pick on leading national progressive stations, WMMR-FM, WOWI-FM, and WOUR-FM for that week.

The album was also reviewed in the 6 October 1973 issue of Record World with the reviewer telling the reader to look no further if funky rock-and-roll was their cup of tea. The picks were, "Funky Broadway", "If Lovin' You Wasn't So Easy to Do" and "Clouds". It was also reported in that issue that the album was seeing play action at WBCN-FM.

==== Further activities ====
According to the 13 October 1973 issue of Record World, the seven-piece group, Duke Williams and the Extremes with the encouragement of good airplay on their album were ready to tour in November. Williams was pictured in the article with producers, Skip Drinkwater and T.J. Tindall and Mike Olivieri who was the Warner Bros. promotion man from New York.

Duke Williams and the Extremes recorded the song "Chinese Chicken". Backed with "I've Been Loving You Too Long (To Stop Now)", it was released on Capricorn 0028. It was reviewed in the 1 June 1974 issue of Cash Box. The reviewer mentioned that 1974 seemed to be the year of the instrumental and then said that there was no way that the group would miss the mark with this record. The reviewer also said that it was a strong, driving, funky outing and a great dance item and would find some R&B play.

==== Fantastic Fedora ====
According to the 22 June issue of Record World, Fantastic Fedora was seeing FM action at WMMR-FM in Philadelphia and WOWI-FM in Norfolk Virginia.

The group's Fantastic Fedora album was reviewed in the 6 July issue of Record World. The reviewer said that T. J. Tindall handled the production chores well and picked "Function at the Junction" as a track that captured the group's Southern soul.

According to the 9 October 1974 issue of The Walrus, regarding their Fantastic Fedora album, apart from The Rascals, no white band in recent memory of the reviewer had successfully handled R&B like Duke Williams & the Extremes. At the time they were getting heavy airplay on WIOT-FM in Toledo, Ohio.

==== Further activities ====
On 1 September 1974, Duke Willians & The Extremes, along with Joe Cocker and Mahogany Rush appeared at the Hara Arena where they performed to a near capacity audience of 5000. They were the first act to appear. The reviewer's reaction was that they cooked.

=== 1980s ===
During the 1980s, Williams was a member of The Chambers Brothers Band which featured Willie Chambers, Joe Chambers, Chris Chambers, Corey Spags and Cotton Kent. The ensemble recorded three songs at Rusk Studios. They were "Here We Go", "Let's Get Funky" and "You Are My Life". They released a 12" EP, The Chambers Brothers Are Back in 1985.

== Later years ==
A song, "Taking Back My Freedom" that was written by Duke Williams and Corey Spagnolo, credited to Duke Williams & The Extremes was released online on 4 July 2016. The backing vocals were provided by The Chambers Brothers and percussion was by Moses Wheelock.

Drummer Corey Spagnolo is part of the country outfit, A Band Called Alexis.
