= The Trammps =

American disco and soul band

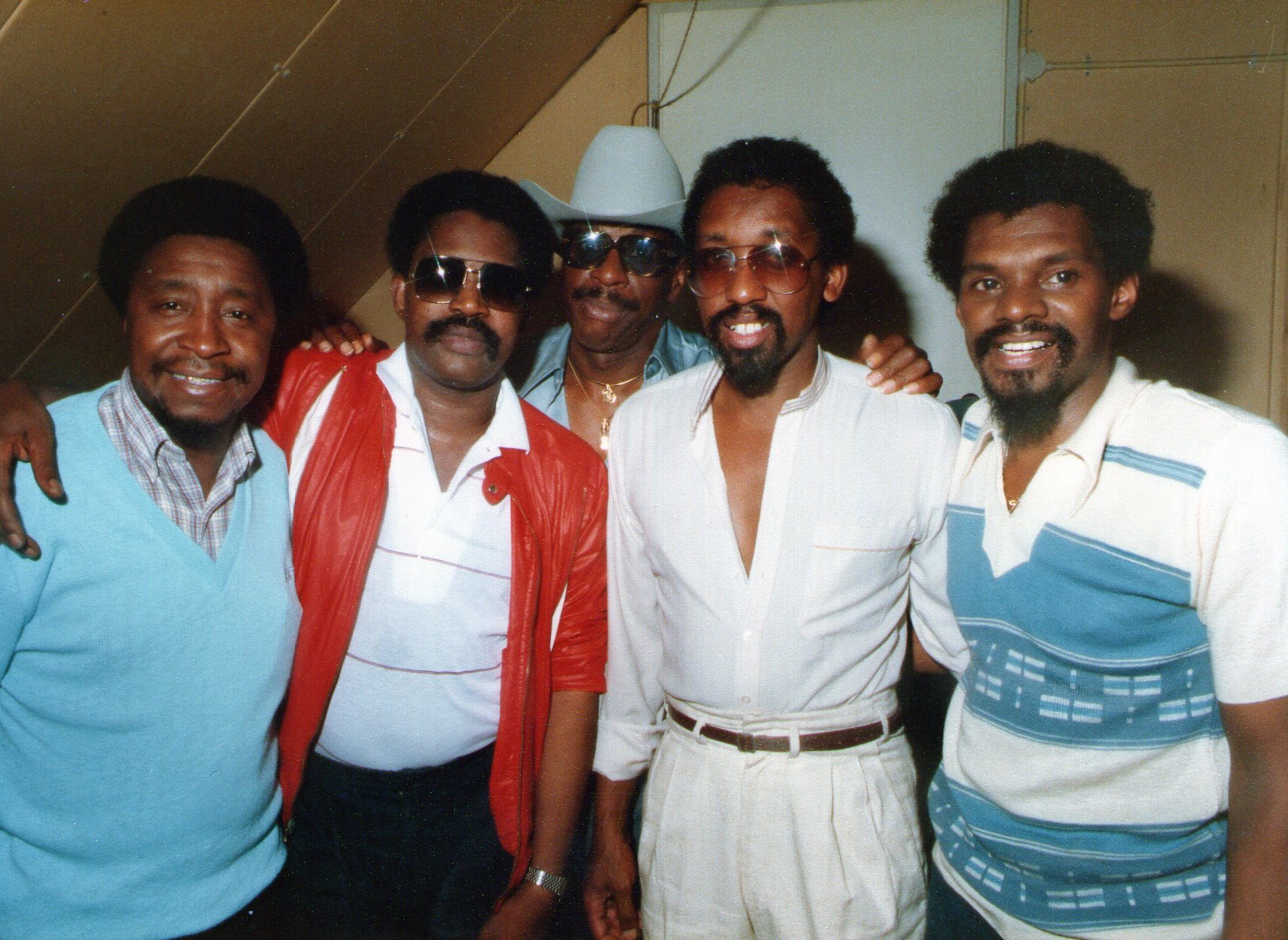

Background information
- Origin: Philadelphia, Pennsylvania, United States
- Genres: Disco; soul; R&B
- Years active: 1972–present
- Labels: Golden Fleece Records; Atlantic; Buddah; Philadelphia International
- Past members: Ronnie Baker; Ed Cermanski; John Davis; Dave Dixon; Jimmy Ellis; Dennis Harris; Norman Harris; John Hart; Reuben Henderson; Rusty Jackmon; Fred Joiner; Gene "Faith" Jones; Steve Kelly; Ron Kersey; Roger Stevens; Michael Thompson; Robert Upchurch; Harold "Doc" Wade; Stanley Wade; Harold Watkins; Priestly Williams; Earl Young
- Website: Official website

The Trammps are an American disco and soul band, who were based in Philadelphia and were one of the first disco bands.

The band's first major success was their 1972 cover version of "Zing! Went the Strings of My Heart", while the first disco track they released was "Love Epidemic" in 1973. However, they are best known for their song "Disco Inferno" which was included on the Grammy-winning Saturday Night Fever soundtrack. When originally released in 1976, "Disco Inferno" became a UK pop hit and US R&B and Dance hit topping the Dance chart for 6 weeks in early 1977. After inclusion on the Saturday Night Fever soundtrack, the song was re-released in 1978 and became a US pop hit peaking at number 11.

== History ==
=== 1970s ===
The history of the Trammps grew from the 1960s group the Volcanos, who later became the Moods. With a number of line-up changes by the early 1970s, the band membership included gospel-influenced lead singer Jimmy Ellis, drummer and singer (bass voice) Earl Young, with brothers Stanley and Harold 'Doc' Wade. Members of the Philadelphia recording band MFSB played with the group on records and on tour in the 1970s with singer Robert Upchurch joining later. The group was produced by the Philadelphia team of Ronnie Baker, Norman Harris and Young, all MFSB mainstays who played on the recording sessions and contributed songs.

Their debut chart entry came via an upbeat cover version of the standard "Zing! Went the Strings of My Heart", featuring Young's bass voice, which became a top 20 US R&B chart hit in 1972.

Their first few recordings were released on Buddah Records, including "Zing! Went the Strings of My Heart", which was a hit on the Billboard R&B chart in 1973, before a re-release saw it climb in the UK two years later. Several R&B hits followed during a stay with Philadelphia International subsidiary Golden Fleece (run by Baker-Harris-Young) before they signed to Atlantic Records.

Their single "Disco Inferno" (1976), which was included on the Grammy Award-winning Saturday Night Fever: The Original Movie Sound Track in 1977, reached No. 11 on the Billboard Hot 100 chart in May 1978.

In a time when real soul groups, especially of the uptempo persuasion, have become as rare as snail darters, the Trammps fill a gap.

— Christgau's Record Guide: Rock Albums of the Seventies (1981)

Other major hits included "Hold Back the Night" (1975) (UK No. 5) and "That's Where the Happy People Go" (1976). In late 1977, the Trammps released the song "The Night the Lights Went Out" to commemorate the electrical blackout that affected New York City on July 13–14, 1977.

Their signature song "Disco Inferno" has been covered by Tina Turner and Cyndi Lauper. In addition, Graham Parker covered "Hold Back the Night" on The Pink Parker EP in 1977, and reached No. 24 in the UK Singles Chart, and top 60 in the US. In 2021, "Disco Inferno" was certified Silver by the British Phonographic Industry, together with "Can We Come Together" (from the album Where the Happy People Go).

=== Dissolution and aftermath ===
On September 19, 2005, the group's "Disco Inferno" was inducted into the Dance Music Hall of Fame at a ceremony held in New York City. The song was part-written by Ron Kersey, a producer-arranger and a member of MFSB, who also played with the Trammps in the 1970s for a time. During the ceremony, the original band members performed together for the first time in 25 years. Disco Inferno has also had a resurgence and has garnered new fans with the 2016 presidential campaign of Bernie Sanders in the US due to the song's refrain of burn, baby, burn (slightly altered to "Bern, baby, Bern").

By 2007, two versions of the group, with differing line-ups, toured the nostalgia circuit.

On March 8, 2012, lead singer Jimmy Ellis died at a nursing home in Rock Hill, South Carolina (where he was born on November 15, 1937), at the age of 74. The cause of death was not immediately known but he suffered from Alzheimer's disease.

The music journalist Ron Wynn noted: "the Trammps' prowess can't be measured by chart popularity; Ellis' booming, joyous vocals brilliantly championed the celebratory fervor and atmosphere that made disco both loved and hated among music fans."

On June 30, 2019, the Trammps appeared on HBO's Big Little Lies, Season 2, episode 4 entitled "She Knows".

Stan Wade died in January 2021.

== Band members ==
- Ronnie Baker (1947–1990) – bass, vocals
- Ed Cermanski – keyboards
- John Davis – saxophone
- Jimmy Ellis (1937–2012) – lead vocals
- Dennis Harris – guitar
- Norman Harris (1947–1987) – guitar, vocals
- John Hart (1941–2008) – organ
- Reuben Henderson – saxophone
- Rusty Jackmon – bass
- Fred Joiner – trombone
- Gene Jones (a.k.a. Gene Faith) – original lead vocalist
- Steve Kelly – vocals
- Ron Kersey b. Tyrone G. Kersey (1945–2005) – keyboards
- Barrington McDonald (1942–2007) – guitar
- Cubby St Charles – vocals
- Roger Stevens – trumpet
- Michael Thompson – drums (stopped 1995)
- Robert Upchurch – vocals
- Harold "Doc" Wade – guitar, vocals
- Stanley Wade – bass, vocals (d. 2021)
- Harold Watkins – trombone
- Priestly Williams – trumpet
- Earl Young (b. 1940) – drums, vocals

=== Later members ===
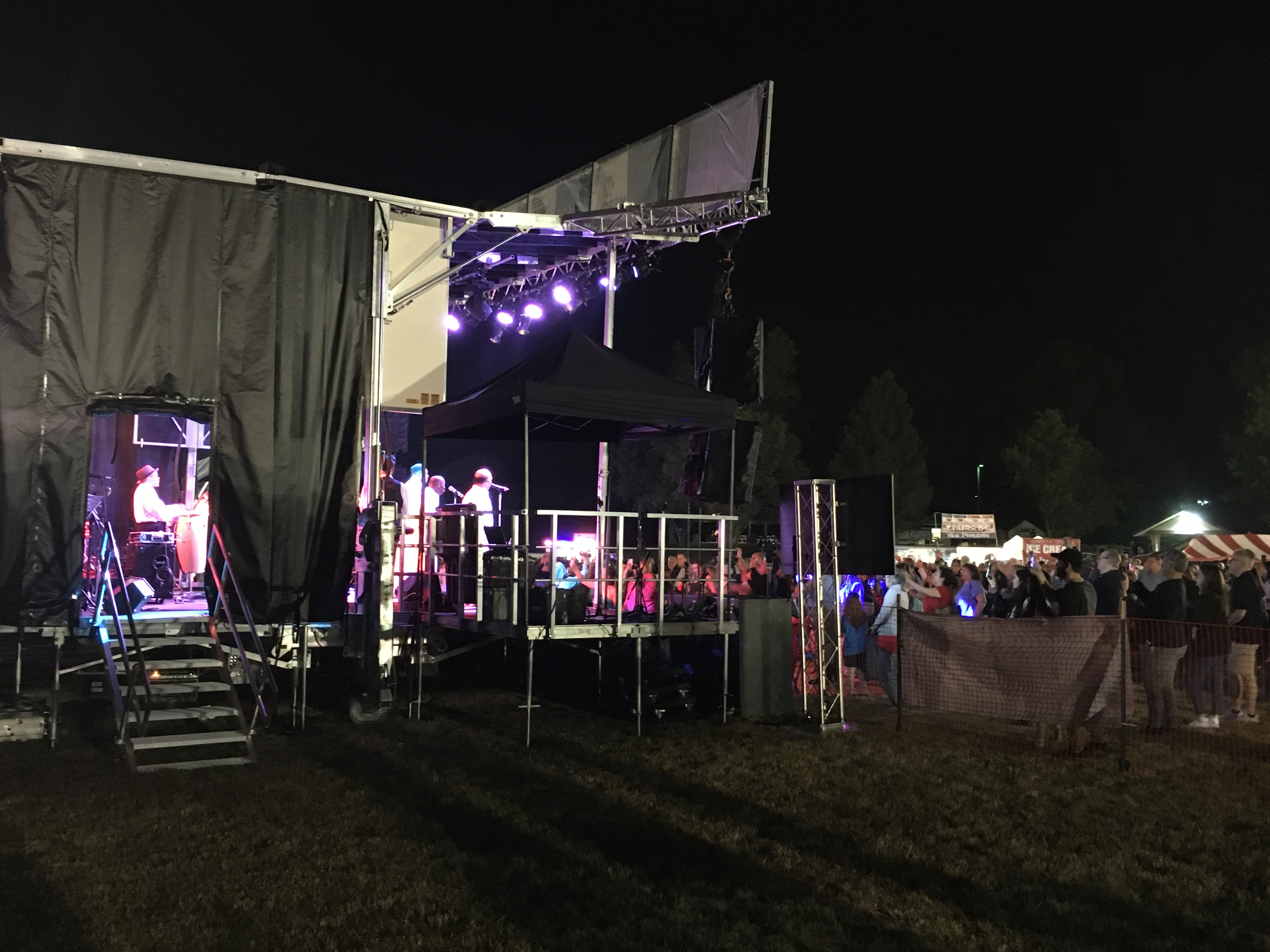
The Trammps performing a free outdoor concert in Manalapan, New Jersey, in 2023

- Jerry Collins – vocals
- Jimmy Wells – lead vocals
- Van Fields – vocals
- Lafayette Gamble – vocals
- Michael Natalini – drums

Stan & Doc Wade & Robert Upchurch Trammps (original) current touring group

- Ed Cermanski – keyboards
- Harold "Doc" Wade – vocals
- Robert Upchurch – vocals
- Jimmy Wells – vocals
- Lafayette Gamble – vocals
- Van Fields – vocals
- Sheppie Fitts – drums
- Rusty Stone – bass
- David Rue – guitar
- Joe Marcinek – saxophone
- Carmen Tornambe – trumpet

== Discography ==
- Trammps (1975)
- The Legendary Zing Album (1975)
- Where the Happy People Go (1976)
- Disco Inferno (1976)
- The Trammps III (1977)
- The Whole World's Dancing (1979)
- Mixin' It Up (1980)
- Slipping Out (1980)
- This One Is for the Party (1984)

== See also ==
- List of Billboard number-one dance club songs
- List of artists who reached number one on the U.S. Dance Club Songs chart
- Ron Kersey, a one-time band member and songwriter
- "Hate It or Love It", a single by The Game sampling "Rubber Band"
