= Allan Felder =

American songwriter

- Born: Allan Wayne Felder; May 26, 1943; Philadelphia, Pennsylvania, United States
- Died: November 7, 1999 (aged 56)
- Occupation: Songwriter

Allan Wayne Felder (May 26, 1943 – November 7, 1999) was an American songwriter. He had many successes with songs created during the 1960s, 1970s, and 1980s – frequently collaborating with Norman Harris, Bunny Sigler, and Ronnie Baker. His sister is Nadine Felder of Honey And The Bees. Since 2015, the publishing interest of Allan Felder’s catalog has been represented by Reservoir Media Management.
