= Ron Kersey =

American musician (1949–2005)

- Born: Tyrone Garfield Kersey; April 7, 1949; Philadelphia, Pennsylvania, U.S.
- Died: January 25, 2005 (aged 55) Philadelphia, Pennsylvania, U.S.
- Genres: Disco; R&B
- Occupations: Musician; songwriter; producer; arranger
- Instrument: Keyboard
- Years active: 1970s–1980s
- Formerly of: The Trammps; MFSB; Salsoul Orchestra
- Notable work: "Disco Inferno"

Tyrone Garfield Kersey (April 7, 1949 – January 25, 2005), also known as Ron "Have Mercy" Kersey, was an American keyboardist, songwriter, producer, and arranger, most known for writing the music to "Disco Inferno" by The Trammps.

== Biography ==
Kersey was born in Philadelphia, Pennsylvania. He attended and graduated from Edison High School where he sang in the glee club and played football. He was a lifelong football fan and followed the Philadelphia Eagles. Kersey served in the United States Air Force from 1967 through 1972. While in the service he often played piano and keyboards at the local boards. This is when he gained the nickname "Have Mercy"; it was a phrase patrons would scream at him as he played, because they loved his funky rhythms. Upon returning to Philadelphia, he re-acquainted himself with his longtime friend and musician Norman Harris, who was instrumental in Kersey becoming a studio musician at Sigma Sound Studios. Kersey later became a member of the disco band The Trammps. He did not like the constant travel, so he decided to quit the band and concentrate on producing and writing. In 1978, he received a Grammy Award as producer for the soundtrack to Saturday Night Fever, which included "Disco Inferno", a song he co-wrote with Leroy Green. He was also a member of MFSB and the Salsoul Orchestra. He moved to Los Angeles in 1980 and continued his career as a studio musician, producer, and songwriter.

In addition to co-writing "Disco Inferno", Kersey produced or co-wrote songs that reached the top 20 for other artists. He produced Stephanie Mills's "I Have Learned to Respect the Power of Love", which charted at No. 1 for two weeks on the R&B chart. It was Mills's first number-one single and would prove to be her most successful single. Kersey was also the producer for her next single, "If I Were Your Woman", a cover of the Gladys Knight & the Pips hit, which reached number one for three weeks on the same chart. In addition, he co-wrote "Every Drop of Your Love" for Stacy Lattisaw, which peaked at No. 8 on the R&B chart. He co-wrote the slow jam "Send for Me" with his friend Sam Dees for Atlantic Starr which peaked at No. 16. For Evelyn "Champagne" King, he co-wrote "Kisses Don't Lie" with Alex Brown, peaking at No. 17 on the R&B chart. Kersey also appears on many Philadelphia International Records albums as a studio musician, most notably Teddy by Teddy Pendergrass, Unmistakably Lou by Lou Rawls, and Message in the Music by The O'Jays.

Kersey suffered a stroke in 1997 and died in Philadelphia in 2005.
