= Ronnie Baker (musician) =

American record producer, bassist, arranger and songwriter

Ronald Baker (1947 – 1990) was an American record producer, bassist, arranger and songwriter. He participated on many Gamble and Huff recordings and was one-third of the production team Baker-Harris-Young. He was one of The Trammps, who are best known for their hit "Disco Inferno", which hit #11 on the Billboard Hot 100 in 1978.

Baker died in 1990, but continued to be active until then.

In 2016, Baker was posthumously inducted into the Musicians Hall of Fame and Museum.
