= Earl Young (drummer) =

American drummer (born 1940)

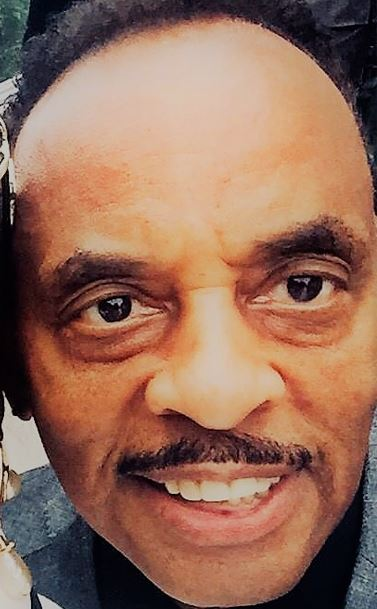
- Young in 2017

Background information
- Born: Earl Donald Young; June 2, 1940 (age 86); Philadelphia, Pennsylvania, U.S.
- Genres: Soul, R&B, disco
- Occupations: Musician, drummer, bass vocalist
- Instruments: Drums, vocals
- Years active: 1960s–present

Earl Donald Young (born June 2, 1940) is a Philadelphia-based drummer who rose to prominence in the early 1970s as part of the Philly Soul sound. Young is best known as the founder and leader of The Trammps who had a hit record with "Disco Inferno". Young, along with Ronnie Baker and Norman Harris (the trio best known as Baker-Harris-Young), was the owner of the Golden Fleece record label.

== Career ==
Young is seen as the inventor of the disco-style of rock drumming (in Harold Melvin & The Blue Notes's "The Love I Lost" from 1973), and is often credited with popularizing four-on-the-floor bass drum beats, and as being the first drummer to make extensive and distinctive use of the hi-hat cymbal (i.e. fast, rhythmic and crisp use of open and closed hi-hats) throughout the playing time of an R&B song. This led to DJs favoring his recordings because they could hear the cymbal quite easily in their headphones as they "cued up" records to be mixed.

In the mid-sixties Young played drums on many recordings for the Philadelphia-based record label "ARCTIC" (Records), on which his own band "The Volcanos" (later renamed The Trammps) was signed (e.g. The Ambassadors – "Ain't Got The Love Of One Girl (On My Mind)", Della Humphrey - "Let's Wait Until Dark", Kenny Gamble - "The Jokes on You", in 1969 the whole the Ambassadors LP "Soul Summit"). He also played for the Philadelphia-based record label "Phil L.A. Of Soul" on Cliff Nobles & Co. - "Love Is All Right (The Horse)" in 1968 (a Jesse Martin production), a popular Northern Soul classic.

Young featured prominently on many Philadelphia International Records (PIR) recordings before moving on to Salsoul Records as part of the house band for the label. He recorded extensively at Philadelphia's Sigma Sound Studios as part of the group of musicians knows as MFSB. In a 2005 interview with Modern Drummer magazine, bassist Anthony Jackson was asked whether he recalled working with Young: "Yes, of course. That was back in the days when I was working with Gamble & Huff in Philadelphia. I didn't get to do too much with Earl because I was usually playing with Billy Paul's band, and Norman Farrington was on drums. But as I continued working for Gamble & Huff, I did a few sessions with Earl. My big Earl project was the O'Jays' "For The Love Of Money". I was astounded by his power. It may not come through on the records, but he is an ass-kicker. Listen to a classic Earl Young track like Harold Melvin & The Blue Notes' "If You Don't Know Me By Now". There's no click track. Earl had the drummer's equivalent of perfect pitch. I only saw the term referred to once, and it's called 'infallible rhythm.' Nobody has absolutely perfect time, but you find people like Buddy Rich and Tony Williams who can play without the time drifting. I've also seen studio drumming great James Gadson demonstrate infallible rhythm. I've seen him overdub drums on a track without a click track, and it's just perfect. I haven't spoken to Earl Young since we cut that record, but I've never forgotten those sessions. Earl stands as one of the great drummers. I'll never forget the impact that he made."

In 1989, newcomers Ten City sought out Young to work on their first album for the house music scene, and even commissioned Young to remix of some of the material and as a session drummer.

In September 2008, Young joined some other ex-MFSB musicians on the Carl Dixon/Bobby Eli session at Eli's Studio E in Philadelphia where four new songs were recorded. The rhythm section included Young, Eli, Dennis Harris (the cousin of the Philadelphia guitarist Norman Harris) on guitar, Jimmy Williams (bass guitar), T Conway (keyboards) and Rikki Hicks (percussion). Vocalists on the session were the Philadelphia harmony group Double Exposure performing "Soul Recession", and Chiquita Green.

In 2024 he was featured in the PBS series Disco: Soundtrack of a Revolution.

== Awards and honors ==
In 1979, Young received a Grammy Award for Album of the Year for the Saturday Night Fever soundtrack.

The Philadelphia Music Alliance (PMA) has honored Young with five bronze plaques on the Walk of Fame on Broad Street. He is recognized as a member of the Trammps, the peerless rhythm section Baker, Harris & Young, along with the Philadelphia International Records studio orchestra MFSB and the Salsoul Orchestra, as well as John Davis & the Monster Orchestra.

In 2016, Young was inducted into the Musicians Hall of Fame and Museum.

In 2025, a street in North Philadelphia was renamed 'Earl Young Way' in his honor.
