= Norman Harris (musician) =

American guitarist, producer, music arranger and songwriter (1947–1987)

- Born: Norman Ray Harris; October 14, 1947; Danville, Virginia, U.S.
- Died: March 20, 1987 (aged 39) Philadelphia, Pennsylvania, U.S.
- Genres: R&B, soul
- Occupation: Musician
- Instrument: Guitar
- Formerly of: MFSB

Norman Ray Harris (October 14, 1947 – March 20, 1987) was an American guitarist, producer, music arranger and songwriter, closely associated with Philly soul. He was a founding member of MFSB, the Philadelphia studio band, and one of the Baker-Harris-Young record production trio.

== Career ==
Harris was a leading arranger for Kenny Gamble and Leon Huff's Philadelphia International Records label in its early years during the 1970s and played guitar on many recording sessions. He also played with Vince Montana's Salsoul Orchestra when several members of MFSB left after financial disagreements with Gamble-Huff in 1974. He later founded his own production company in the mid-1970s called The Harris Machine. In 1980, he released his only solo album, The Harris Machine, on Philadelphia International.

Harris started teaching himself guitar in his teens and began his career in local clubs, often with bassist Ronnie Baker and later drummer Earl Young, and in the house band at the Uptown Theatre in Philadelphia. He then became a session musician as the Philadelphia recording scene expanded.

He later arranged and produced soul and R&B acts during the late 1960s, 1970s and 1980s, including Blue Magic (with whom he had his biggest success, "Sideshow", a No. 1 R&B hit), The Trammps, First Choice, The Dells, The Four Tops, The Temptations, The Whispers, Eddie Kendricks, Barbara Mason, Curtis Mayfield, Bunny Sigler, Joe Simon, South Shore Commission, Executive Suite, and his cousin, Major Harris, a former member of The Delfonics. He also produced several acts, including: Loleatta Holloway, Eddie Holman, Double Exposure and Love Committee, for Salsoul Records, who distributed his subsidiary label, Gold Mind Records.

He died of cardiovascular disease at the age of 39.

In 2016, Harris was inducted into the Musicians Hall of Fame and Museum.

== As Composer (selected) ==
- "Zing! Went the Strings of My Heart" - The Trammps (1972)
- Pray All You Sinners - The Trammps (1973)
- Armed and Extremely Dangerous - First Choice (1973)
- Stop to Start - Blue Magic (1973)
- Side Show - Blue Magic (1974)
- Hold Back the Night - The Trammps (1975)
- Penguin at the Big Apple - The Trammps (1975)
- Scruboard - The Trammps (1975)
- Rubber Band - The Trammps (1975)
- Tom's Song - The Trammps (1975)
- Dreamin' - Loleatta Holloway (1976)
- Hit and Run - Loleatta Holloway (1976)
- We're Getting Stronger - Loleatta Holloway (1977)
- Doctor Love - First Choice (1977)
- Catch me on Rebound - Loleatta Holloway (1978)

== See also ==
- R&B
