= Ten Percent (disambiguation) =

Ten Percent may refer to:

== Arts ==
- Ten Percent, album by Double Exposure
- Ten Percent (song), the title song from the album of the same name
- Call My Agent!, originally titled Dix pour cent ('ten percent'), a French television series based on talent agents
- Ten Percent (TV series), a British television adaptation of the French series

== History ==
- Ten percent plan, a post-American Civil War reconstruction plan
- Ten Percent Ring, a group of outlaws who stole 10% of taxes in Tombstone, Arizona

== Other ==
- Asif Ali Zardari, Pakistani politician nicknamed "Mr. Ten Percent"
- Ten Percenter, a type of Canadian political flyer
- Ten percent of the brain myth, a myth that humans use only 10% of their brains
- Queer & Trans Alliance, originally named the Ten Percent Society after the belief that 10% of the human population is gay
