= Jan Pawul =

Polish DJ (born 1952)

- Also known as: Yahu, Yahudeejay
- Born: Jan Pawul; 5 July 1952 (age 74); Dzierżoniów, Poland
- Occupations: DJ, author
- Years active: 1969–present

External image
- Jan "Yahu" Pawul in 1974

Jan "Yahu" Pawul (born July 5, 1952) is a Polish discotheque DJ, who worked primarily in the 1970s and the 1980s.

== Career ==
He first became interested in music after he saw the 1964 musical comedy film A Hard Day's Night starring the English rock band the Beatles.

He worked as a DJ mostly throughout the seventies and the eighties, and left the scene in 2011. He was the Honorary Member of both the National Association of Disc Jockeys (NADJ; UK) and the National Association of Discothèque Disc Jockeys (NADD; USA). In February 1972 his article "Dziadek i ojciec Disc-jockeyów" ("The father and grandfather of Disc Jockeys") was published in the monthly magazine Jazz, as the very first journalistic piece about the DJ scene covered in the Polish press.

He went on to collaborate with Barbra Streisand, George McCrae and the Casablanca Records. Multiple articles about Pawul's career were published through the years, mostly in the foreign press—among those publications were Disco International and Club News, DeeJay and Radio Monthly, Disco Mirror, The Melting Pot, and the Disc Jockey & Radio Today. He was inducted into the Disco DJ Hall of Fame by Marty Angelo as the first Polish disc jockey.

In 1973 the British magazine DeeJay and Radio Monthly awarded Pawul as the Top Disco DJ of the Year. He was named the Best Polish Disco Deejay of the Year by the Billboard's International Disco Forum for three consecutive years (1976–1978). The Atlantic Records presented him a gold record to commemorate the sales of more than one million copies of the Chic's single "Dance, Dance, Dance", and the Salsoul Records presented him a platinum record to commemorate the sales of more than 500,000 copies of the "Ten Percent" single by Double Exposure (he helped to widely distribute these songs in the Polish disco clubs).

Tony Hadland, a pioneer in a field of disc jockeys, dedicated a chapter to Pawul in his 2018 memoir Double-Life Disc Jockey. Pawul is also the author of several publications about the disc jockey and disco culture, and Hadland notes in his book that "he's written a lot about disco history, probably more than any other person".

== Personal life ==
Details about Pawul’s marital status or other family members are not as widely documented as his professional career. In May 2025, his 45-year-old son, Piotr "Limal" Pawul, died after a prolonged battle with cancer. Pawul expressed his grief publicly, speculating that environmental pollution from their time living near a steel mill in Ruda Śląska may have contributed to Piotr’s illness. To honor his son, Pawul created a digital tribute through a dedicated blog and social media, encouraging others to share memories of Piotr.

== Accolades ==
- 1973: DeeJay and Radio Monthly's award for the Top Disco DJ of the Year
- 1976: Billboard's International Disco Forum's award for the Best Polish Disco Deejay of the Year
- 1977: Billboard's International Disco Forum's award for the Best Polish Disco Deejay of the Year
- 1978: Billboard's International Disco Forum's award for the Best Polish Disco Deejay of the Year
- A gold record for helping to widely distribute the song "Dance, Dance, Dance" in the Polish clubs (presented by the Atlantic Records)
- A platinum record for helping to widely distribute the song "Ten Percent" in the Polish clubs (presented by the Salsoul Records)

== Publications ==
- Modelka profesjonalna: poradnik (1997)
- Deejays (2016), ISBN 978-83-945523-2-9
- Discjockey: zdeptane marzenia (2016), ISBN 978-83-945523-0-5
- Silent Records (2016), ISBN 978-83-945523-1-2
- Italian Disco History (2018), ISBN 978-83-945523-3-6
- Yahudeejay: Trampled Dreams (2019), ISBN 978-83-945523-5-0

== Bibliography ==
- Hadland, Tony (2018). Double-Life Disc Jockey. FeedaRead. pp. 100–105. ISBN 978-1788762960.
