= Remix =

Media altered from its original state

A remix is a work made by taking material from one or more existing sources and combining or altering it to form something new. The practice is most closely associated with popular music, in which a remix is typically an alternative version of a recorded song, created by recombining elements of the original recording.

The concept has also been extended to literature, the visual arts, and other media, including video and website mashups. Because remixes often use copyrighted material, they may be treated as derivative works and can raise questions of copyright and fair use; some jurisdictions provide limited exceptions, and licences such as those issued by Creative Commons are used to permit reuse in advance.

== Music ==
=== Origins ===
Modern remixing had its roots in the dance-hall culture of late-1960s and early-1970s Jamaica. The fluid evolution of music that encompassed ska, rocksteady, reggae and dub was embraced by local music mixers who deconstructed and rebuilt tracks to suit the tastes of their audience. Producers and engineers like Ruddy Redwood, King Tubby and Lee "Scratch" Perry popularized stripped-down instrumental mixes (which they called "versions") of reggae tunes. At first, they simply dropped the vocal tracks, but soon more sophisticated effects were created, dropping separate instrumental tracks in and out of the mix, isolating and repeating hooks, and adding various effects like echo, reverberation and delay. The German krautrock band Neu! also used other effects on side two of their album Neu! 2 by manipulating their previously released single "Super/Neuschnee" multiple ways, utilizing playback at different turntable speeds or mangling by using a cassette recorder.

From the mid-1970s, DJs in early discothèques were performing similar tricks with disco songs (using loops and tape edits) to get dancers on the floor and keep them there. One noteworthy figure was Tom Moulton, who invented the dance remix as we now know it. Though not a DJ (a popular misconception), Moulton had begun his career by making a homemade mix tape for a Fire Island dance club in the late 1960s. His tapes eventually became popular and he came to the attention of the music industry in New York City. At first, Moulton was simply called upon to improve the aesthetics of dance-oriented recordings before release ("I didn't do the remix, I did the mix"—Tom Moulton). Eventually, he moved from being a "fix it" man on pop records to specializing in remixes for the dance floor. Along the way, he invented the breakdown section and the 12-inch single vinyl format. Walter Gibbons provided the dance version of the first commercial 12-inch single ("Ten Percent", by Double Exposure). Contrary to popular belief, Gibbons did not mix the record. In fact his version was a re-edit of the original mix. Moulton, Gibbons and their contemporaries (Jim Burgess, Tee Scott, and later Larry Levan and Shep Pettibone) at Salsoul Records proved to be the most influential group of remixers for the disco era. The Salsoul catalog is seen (especially in the UK and Europe) as being the "canon" for the disco mixer's art form. Pettibone is among a very small number of remixers whose work successfully transitioned from the disco to the house era. (He is certainly the most high-profile remixer to do so.) His contemporaries included Arthur Baker and François Kevorkian.

Contemporaneously to disco in the mid-1970s, the dub and disco remix cultures met through Jamaican immigrants to the Bronx, energizing both and helping to create hip-hop music. Key figures included DJ Kool Herc and Grandmaster Flash. Cutting (alternating between duplicate copies of the same record) and scratching (manually moving the vinyl record beneath the turntable needle) became part of the culture, creating what Slate magazine called "real-time, live-action collage." One of the first mainstream successes of this style of remix was the 1983 track "Rockit" by Herbie Hancock, as remixed by Grand Mixer D.ST. Malcolm McLaren and the creative team behind ZTT Records would feature the "cut up" style of hip hop on such records as "Duck Rock". English duo Coldcut's remix of Eric B. & Rakim's "Paid in Full", released in October 1987, is said to have "laid the groundwork for hip hop's entry into the UK mainstream". Dorian Lynskey of The Guardian named it a "benchmark remix" and placed it in his top ten list of remixes.

=== In popular music ===
Scott Brown - "Elysium" (1999)
29 second sample from Scott Brown's "Elysium" - original.

==== 1980s ====
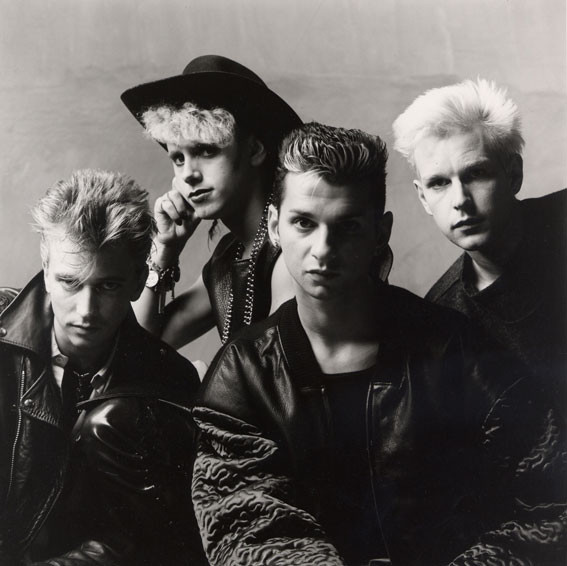
Depeche Mode in 1985, listed in the Guinness Book of World Records in 2023 as the world's most remixed music act.

Electronic band Depeche Mode began producing remixes of their singles in the early 1980s. Vince Clarke, founding member of the band, recalled that for their early tracks,

We recorded the 7", and [producer] Daniel Miller made them into 12". 12" in those days weren't about joining tape together - extended mixes weren't even in our vocabulary at that point; 12" were about making the record louder, because on a [7"] single you could only cut the groove so deep. But the deeper the groove is, the louder the record is, so we made 12" to be played at clubs. What we used to do was mix stuff in and out-drop the bass drum out for a couple of bars, or whatever.

Alan Wilder said that 1982 was "the beginning of when everybody realized you had to make a 12-inch mix to help sell your single". For early remixes, Wilder remembered "chopping up the tape. Just literally running off parses from the track. From the mixing board, on the tape, then chopping the tape up. I remember spending hours and hours chopping up tapes to put them together." Wilder elaborated that "to make a 12" [remix] involved running off differently mixed sections [of a song] onto two-track tape until we had enough pieces to edit the new version together." In the beginning, for bands like Depeche Mode, remixes were made in-house, but by 1984 remixes were being made and officially released by professional DJs such as Adrian Sherwood.

In 1988, Sinéad O'Connor's art-rock song "I Want Your (Hands on Me)" was remixed to emphasize the urban appeal of the composition (the original contains a tight, grinding bassline and a rhythm guitar not entirely unlike Chic's work). In 1989, the Cure's "Pictures of You" was remixed turning "the music on its head, twisted the beat completely, but at the same time left the essential heart of the song intact."

==== 1990s ====
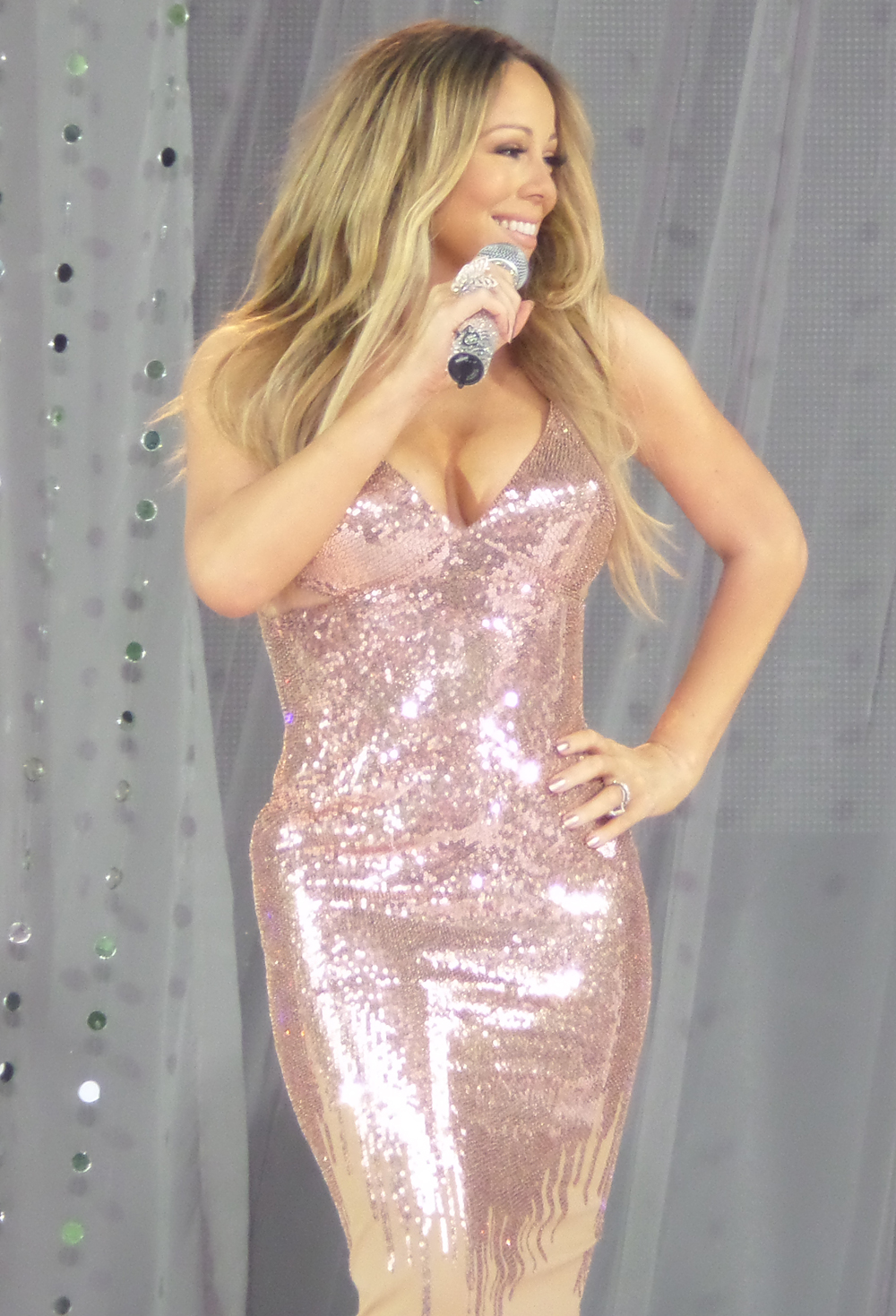
Carey helped popularize having a rapper as a featured act through her post-1995 songs with her remix of "Fantasy" featuring Ol' Dirty Bastard.

In the early 1990s, Mariah Carey became one of the first mainstream artists who re-recorded vocals for a dancefloor version, and by 1993 most of her major dance and urban-targeted versions had been re-sung, e.g. "Dreamlover". Some artists would contribute new or additional vocals for the different versions of their songs. These versions were not technically remixes, as entirely new productions of the material were undertaken (the songs were "re-cut", usually from the ground up). Carey worked with record producer Sean Combs to create the official Bad Boy remix of "Fantasy". The Bad Boy remix features background vocals by Puff Daddy and rapping by Ol' Dirty Bastard, the latter being of concern to Columbia, who feared the sudden change in style would affect sales negatively. Some of the song's R&B elements were removed for the remix, while the bassline and "Genius of Love" sample were emphasized and the bridge from the original version was used as the chorus. There is a version omitting Ol' Dirty Bastard's verses. The "Bad Boy Fantasy Remix" combines the chorus from the original version and the chorus of the Bad Boy Remix, removing Ol' Dirty Bastard's vocals from his second verse. Carey re-recorded vocals for club remixes of the song by David Morales, titled "Daydream Interlude (Fantasy Sweet Dub Mix)".

The Bad Boy remix garnered positive reviews from music critics. "Fantasy" exemplified how a music sample could be transformed "into a fully realized pop masterpiece". The song and its remix arguably remains one of Carey's most important singles to date. Due to the song's commercial success, Carey helped popularize rapper as a featured act through her post-1995 songs. Sasha Frere-Jones, editor of The New Yorker, commented in referencing to the song's remix: "It became standard for R&B/hip-hop stars like Missy Elliott and Beyoncé, to combine melodies with rapped verses. And young white pop stars—including Britney Spears, 'N Sync, and Christina Aguilera—have spent much of the past ten years making pop music that is unmistakably R&B." Moreover, Jones concludes that "Her idea of pairing a female songbird with the leading male MCs of hip-hop changed R&B and, eventually, all of pop. Although now anyone is free to use this idea, the success of 'Mimi' [ref. to The Emancipation of Mimi, her tenth studio album, released almost a decade after "Fantasy"] suggests that it still belongs to Carey." John Norris of MTV News has stated that the remix was "responsible for, I would argue, an entire wave of music that we've seen since and that is the R&B-hip-hop collaboration. You could argue that the 'Fantasy' remix was the single most important recording that she's ever made." Norris echoed the sentiments of TLC's Lisa Lopes, who told MTV that it's because of Mariah that we have "hip-pop." Judnick Mayard, writer of TheFader, wrote that, regarding R&B and hip hop collaboration, "The champion of this movement is Mariah Carey." Mayard also expressed that "To this day ODB and Mariah may still be the best and most random hip hop collaboration of all time", citing that due to the record "Fantasy", "R&B and Hip Hop were the best of step siblings." In the 1998 film Rush Hour, Soo Yong is singing the song while it plays on the car radio, shortly before her kidnapping. In 2011, the experimental metal band Iwrestledabearonce used the song at the beginning and end of the video "You Know That Ain't Them Dogs' Real Voices". Indie artist Grimes has called "Fantasy" one of her favorite songs of all time and has said Mariah is the reason there is a Grimes. M.C. Lyte was asked to provide a "guest rap", and a new tradition was born in pop music. George Michael would feature three artistically differentiated arrangements of "I Want Your Sex" in 1987, highlighting the potential of "serial productions" of a piece to find markets and expand the tastes of listeners. In 1995, after doing "California Love", which proved to be his best-selling single ever, Tupac Shakur would do its remix with Dr. Dre again featured, who originally wanted it for his next album, but relented to let it be on the album All Eyez on Me instead. This also included the reappearance of Roger Troutman, also from the original, but he ended the remix with an ad-lib on the outro. Mariah Carey's song "Heartbreaker" was remixed, containing lyrical interpolations and an instrumental sample from "Ain't No Fun (If the Homies Can't Have None)" by Snoop Dogg. A separate music video was filmed for the remix, shot in black and white and featuring a cameo appearance by Snoop. In 2001, Jessica Simpson released an urban remix of her song "Irresistible", featuring rappers Lil' Bow Wow and Jermaine Dupri, who also produced the track. It samples the Kool & the Gang's song "Jungle Boogie" (1973) and "Why You Treat Me So Bad" by Club Nouveau (1987).

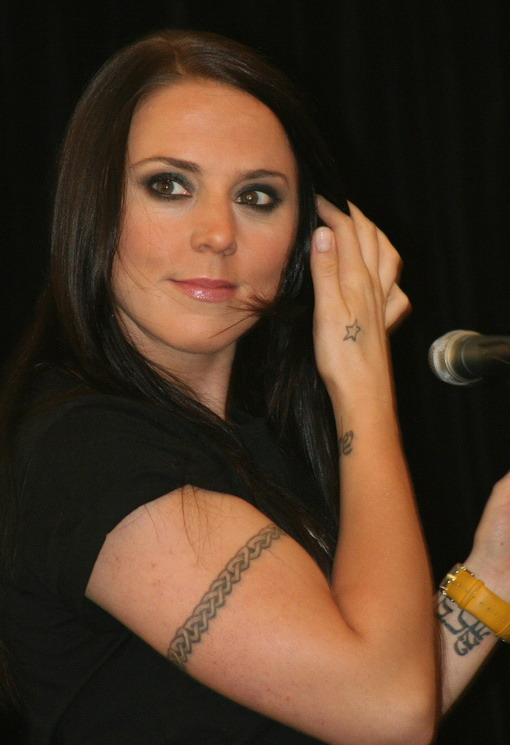
The main single of "I Turn to You" by Melanie C was released as the "Hex Hector Radio Mix", for which Hex Hector won the 2001 Grammy as Remixer of the Year.

Released on July 12, 1999, "Always You" remix by Jennifer Paige reached number six on the Billboard Dance/Club Play chart.

==== 2000s ====
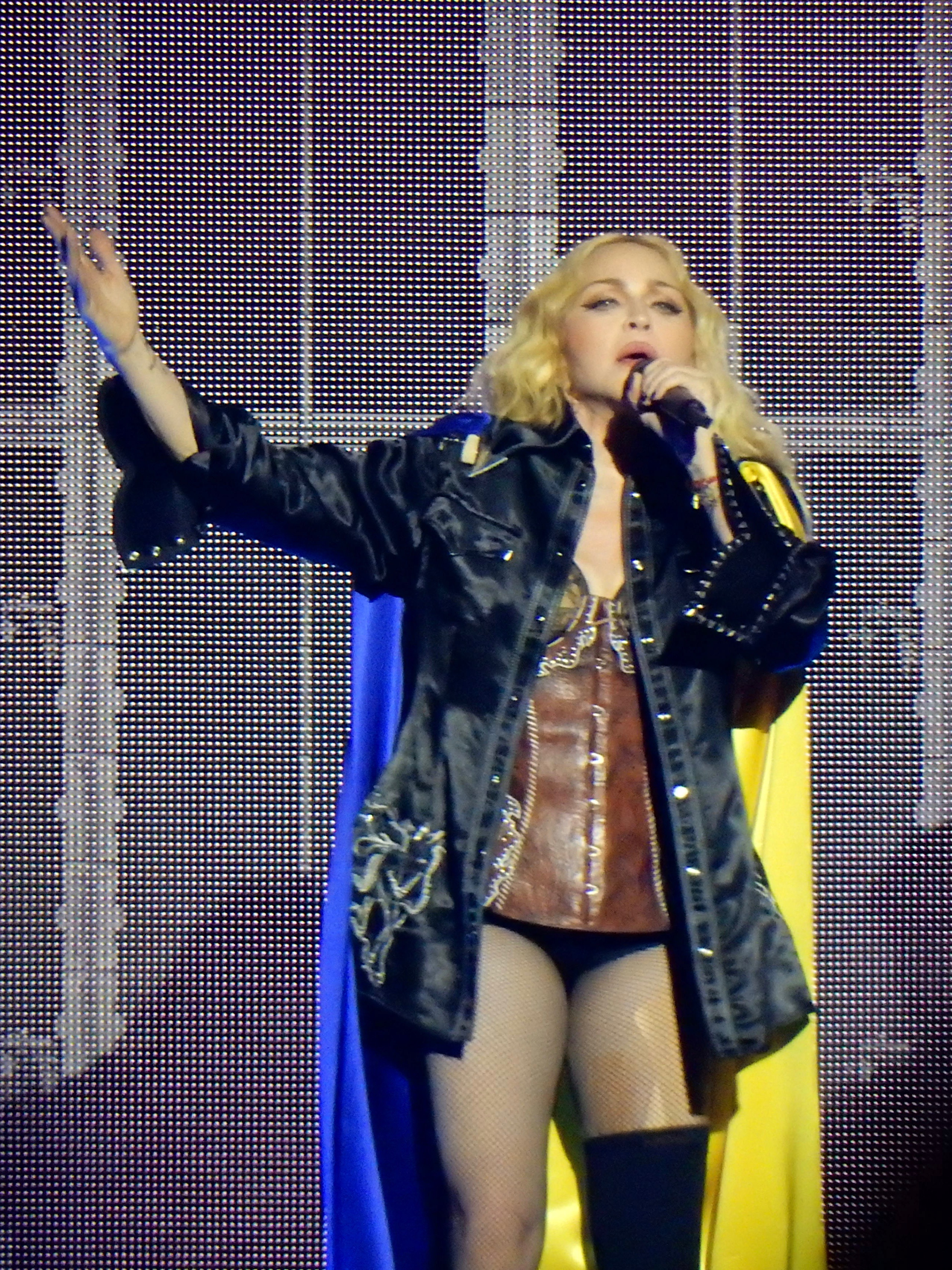
According to the Guinness World Records in 2018, Madonna is one of the most remixed acts. Her remix album You Can Dance is credited with helping popularize remix albums releases.

The main single of "I Turn to You" by Melanie C was released as the "Hex Hector Radio Mix", for which Hex Hector won the 2001 Grammy as Remixer of the Year.

Another well-known example is R. Kelly, who recorded two different versions of "Ignition" for his 2003 album Chocolate Factory. The song is unique in that it segues from the end of the original to the beginning of the remixed version (accompanied by the line "Now usually I don't do this, but uh, go ahead on, break em' off with a little preview of the remix."). In addition, the original version's beginning line "You remind me of something/I just can't think of what it is" is sampled from an older Kelly song, "You Remind Me of Something". Kelly later revealed that he actually wrote "Ignition (remix)" before the purported original version of "Ignition", and created the purported original so that the chorus lyric in his alleged remix would make sense. Madonna's I'm Breathless featured a remix of "Now I'm Following You" that was used to segue from the original to "Vogue" so that the latter could be added to the set without jarring the listener.

==== 2010s ====
Technology allows for easier remixing, leading to a rise in its use in the music industry. It can be done legally, but there have been numerous disputes over rights to samples used in remixed songs. Many famous artists have been involved in remix disputes. In 2015, Jay-Z went to trial over a dispute about his use of a sample from "Khosara Khosara", a composition by Egyptian composer Baligh Hamdy in his song "Big Pimpin'". Osama Fahmy, a nephew of Hamdy, argued that while Jay-Z had the "economic rights" to use the song, he did not have the "moral rights".

In 2015, EDM artist Deadmau5, who worked with Jay-Z's Roc Nation, tried to sue his former manager for remixing his songs without permission, claiming that he gave his manager the go-ahead to use his work for some remixes, but not others. Deadmau5 wanted reimbursement for the remixes his manager made after they had severed ties, because he claimed it was his "moral right" to turn these future remixing opportunities away if he had wanted to. The two parties reached an agreement in 2016 that kept Play Records from making any new remixes.

50 Cent tried to sue rapper Rick Ross in October 2018 for remixing his "In da Club" beat, due to their publicized feud. However, a judge threw out the lawsuit, claiming that 50 Cent did not have copyright on the beat, but rather it belonged to Shady/Aftermath Records.

== Visual art ==
"Remix" in visual is different than the audio version. It is more often replacing characters for new ones and often with humor. The Royal Academy lists American Gothic, Mona Lisa, The Scream and David among the most "parodied" works.

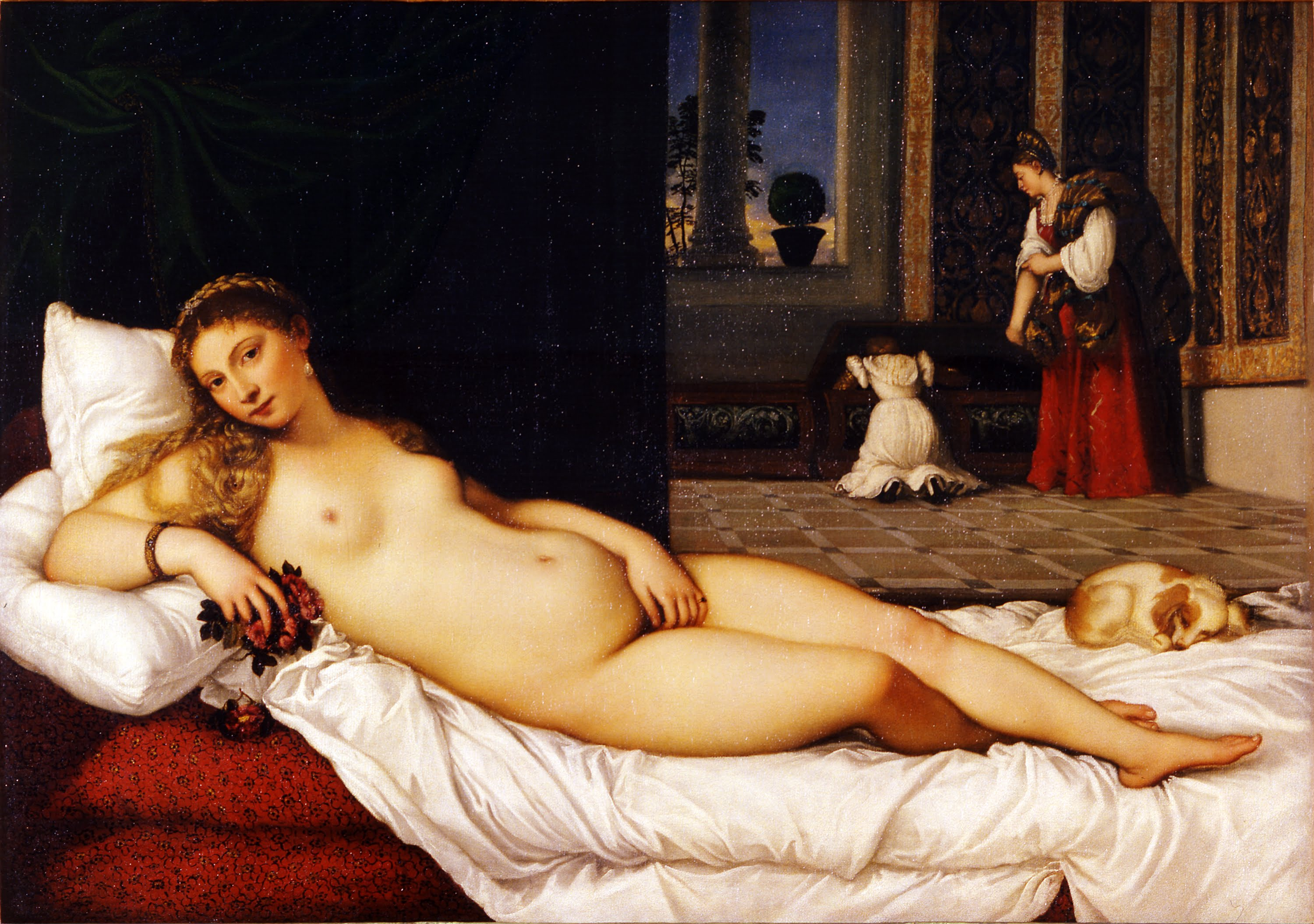
Titian, Venus of Urbino, c. 1534

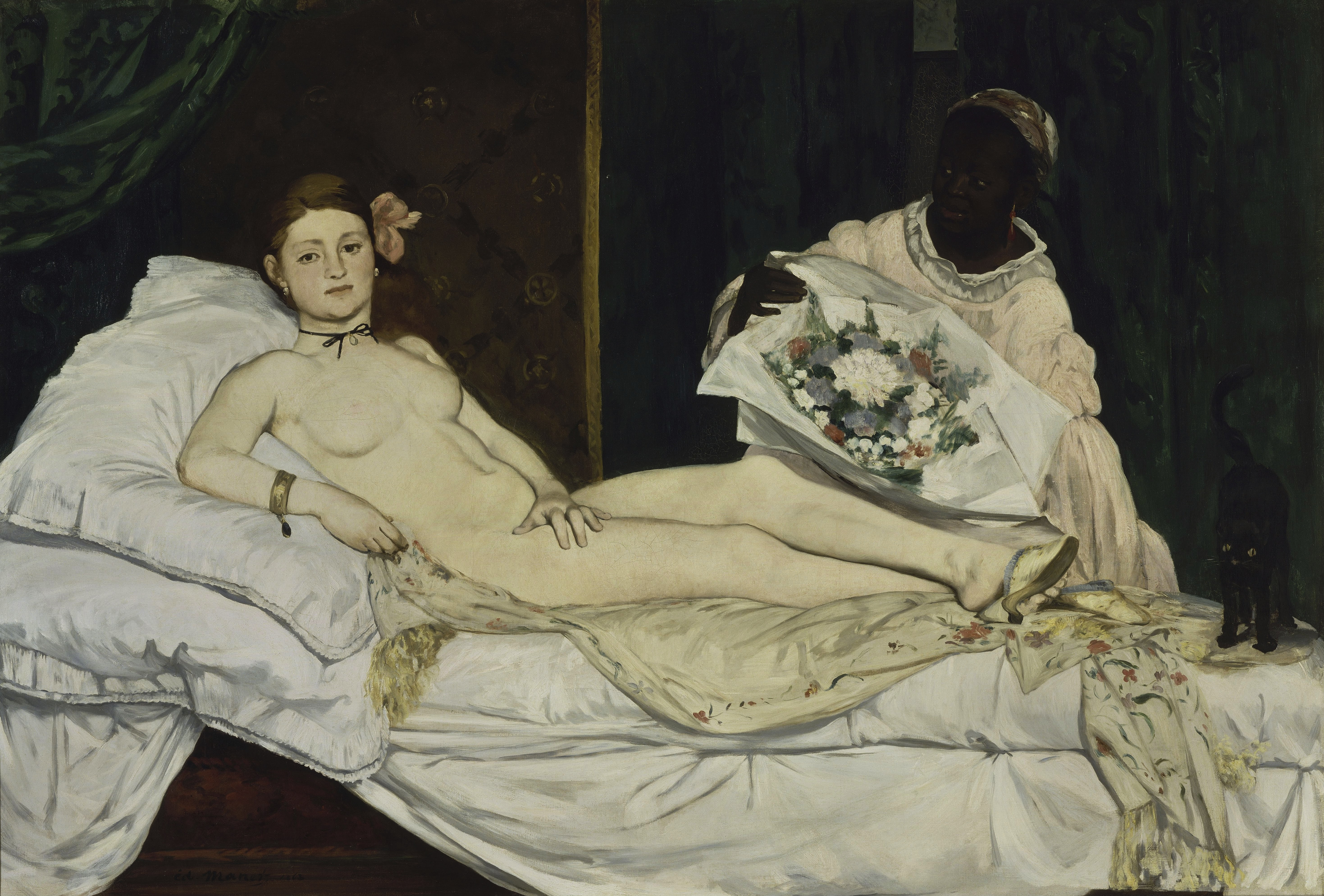
Édouard Manet, Olympia (1863)

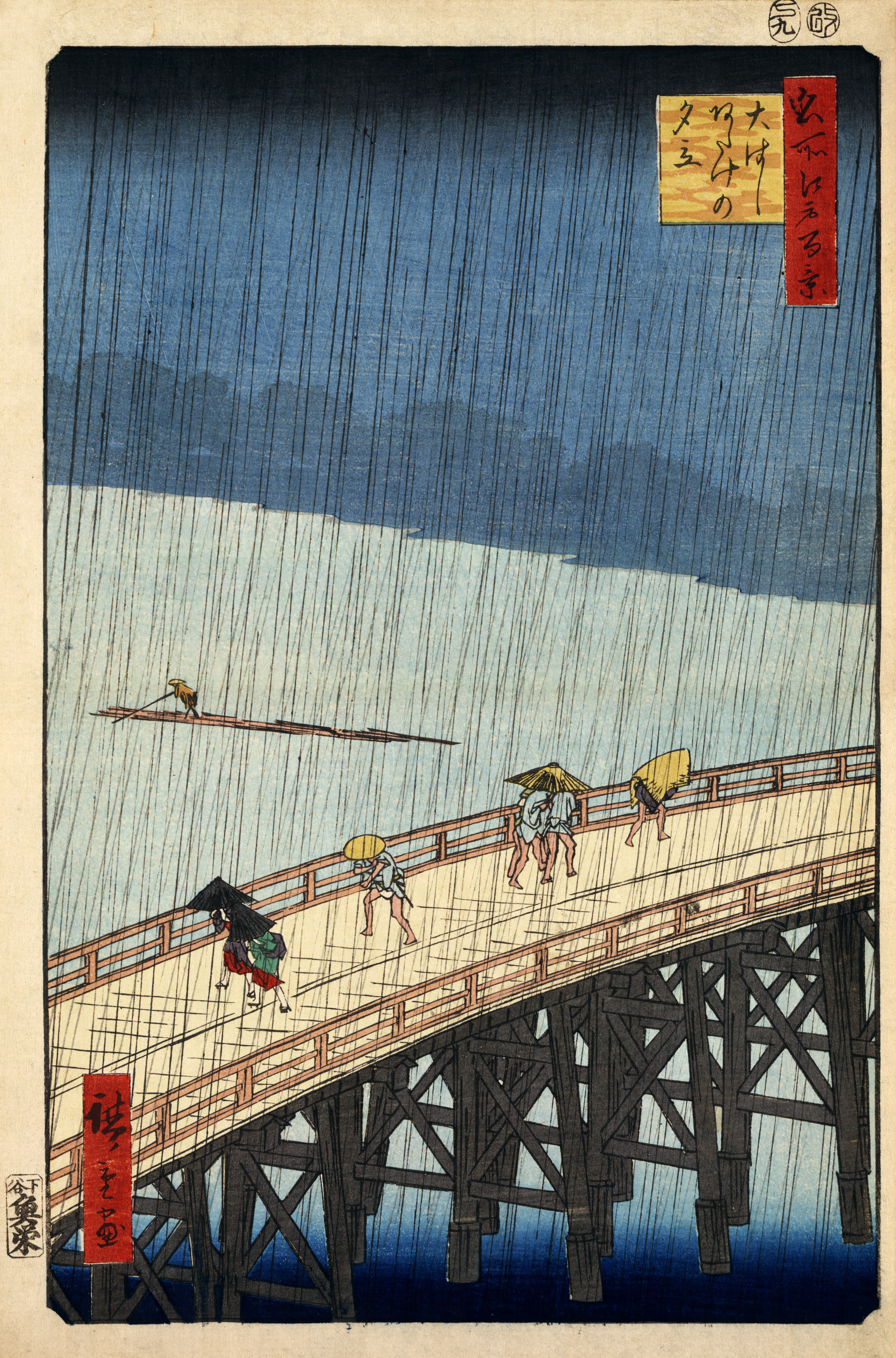
Hiroshige, Sudden Shower over Shin-Ōhashi Bridge and Atake (1857)

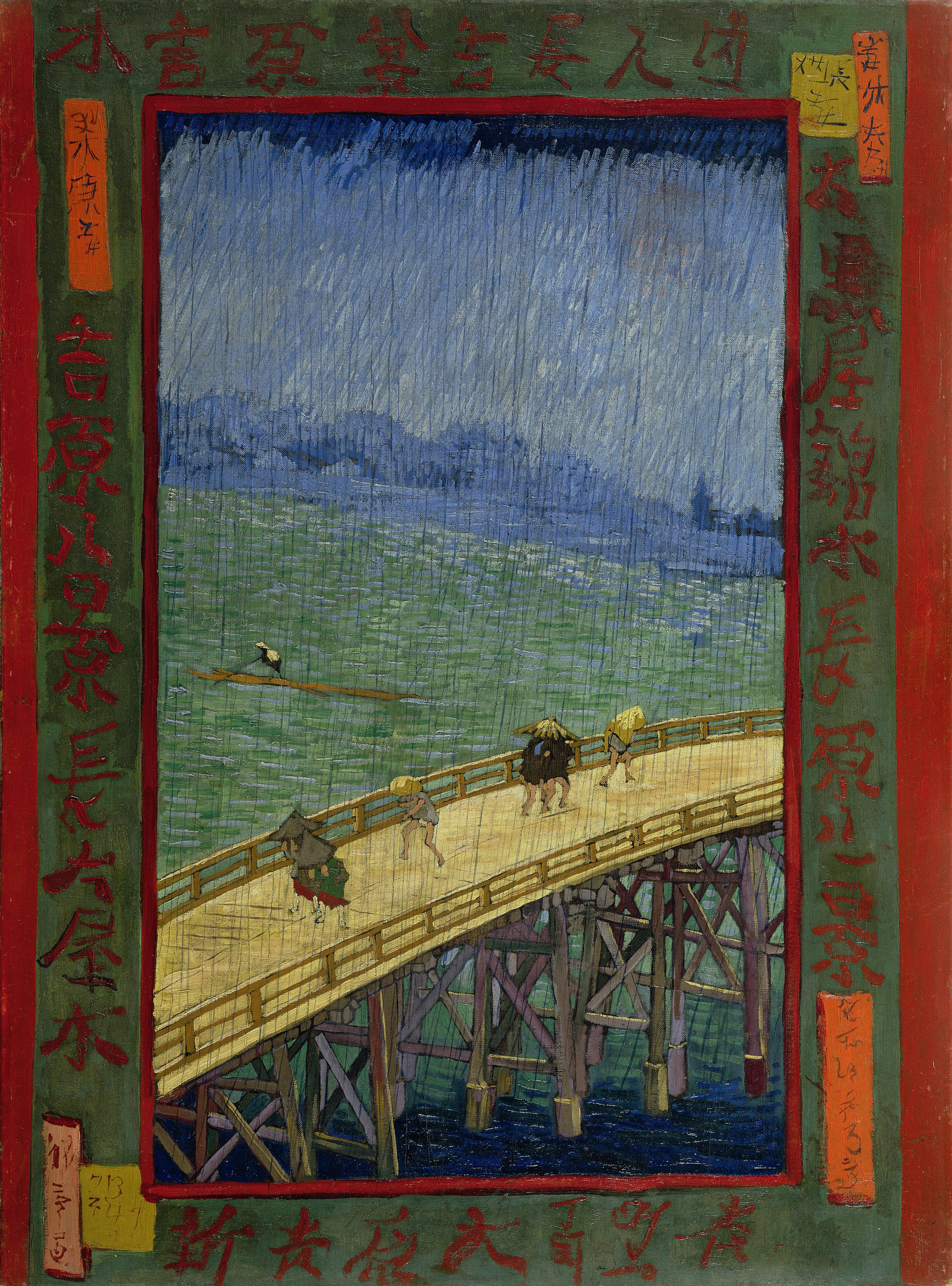
Vincent van Gogh, Bridge in the Rain (after Hiroshige) (1887)

The history of the remix goes back to the 19th century. Van Gogh painted his own versions of works by Millet referring to it as "translating into another language, the one of colours." Similarly Picasso painted 15 versions of Delacroix's Women of Algiers in 1954–55. Roy Lichtenstein redid Picasso's Femme d'Alger in 1963 with his comic-book dots. In 1919, Duchamp's L.H.O.O.Q. used a post card of the painting and added L.H.O.O.Q., which translates to "She has a hot ass." Nick Walker in his bronze Moona Lisa built on this with her lifting up her dress and showing her butt. Ron English remixed Guernica substituting Fred Flintstone or other cartoon characters and was shown at the Peace Museum in Gernika in 2017. Banksy did a series of paintings for a Crude Oils show that included a shopping cart in Monet's water lilies and wilted flowers in Van Gogh's vase painting (Sunflowers from Petrol Station). While it can be solely seen as humorous, it can also be political comment. For example, remixing the Vietnam girl with Mickey Mouse and Ronald McDonald figures designed for kids, but that are icons of American consumer culture.

Remixes are also different than appropriation art which takes an existing image and alters it to make it their own, Shepard Fairey's Obama poster being an example. Appropriation art in this sense can also enter into legal disputes.

Mr. Brainwash often does remixes including celebrities such as Spock and Warhol's Monroe. He also frequently adds Banksy works remixing them into his own painting. His work crosses over often into appropriation art and has involved court disputes.

Speedy Graphito's work focuses on remixes of Picasso, the Mona Lisa, Haring or popular cultural imagery such as Dorothy with an Apple icon apple.

Sculpture by Mark Jenkins after Gustav Klimt's The Kiss, shown in the exhibition Remix at Arsenal, Montreal, 2016.

=== Medium shift ===
Remixes can also shift medium, as in Walker's shift of the Mona Lisa to bronze. Yasumasa Morimura did a performance piece including Van Gogh's Self-Portrait with Bandaged Ear. Cindy Sherman's History Portraits (1988–90) did something similar. Seward Johnson turned Monet and Manet into life-size sculptures. Vik Muniz uses trash to recreate images. In 2022 Ai Weiwei rebuilt Monet's Water Lilies out of 650,000 Lego bricks.

Since 1933, the Pageant of the Masters in Laguna Beach has done summer performances where live models recreate famous artworks, mainly paintings, including Hopper's Nighthawks and Da Vinci's The Last Supper. Performers hold poses against painted backdrops to blend in.

=== Digital remix with Internet-sourced material ===
The internet has made it easy to alter and share images. In 2008 Dan Walsh started Garfield Minus Garfield, which removes Garfield from the strips and leaves Jon talking to himself. Jim Davis backed a book of it and called it "an inspired thing to do." In 2002 Cory Arcangel hacked a Super Mario Bros. cartridge and erased everything but the clouds and sky, naming it Super Mario Clouds. The piece was acquired by the Whitney Museum. Memes are also a form of visual "remixes" that are designed to spread online. Photoshopping or using AI are common means. Sad Keanu is one example where a picture taken of him was remixed and went viral. Memes focused on why Keanu was sad. He later responded to the viral "Sad Keanu" meme by clarifying that he wasn't actually sad when the 2010 photo was taken; he said, "I'm just eating a sandwich, man!" Some scholars also use remix for reworking media images as criticism, such as Karen Keifer-Boyd and Christine Liao's idea of feminist remix.

== Literature and other media ==
=== Literature ===
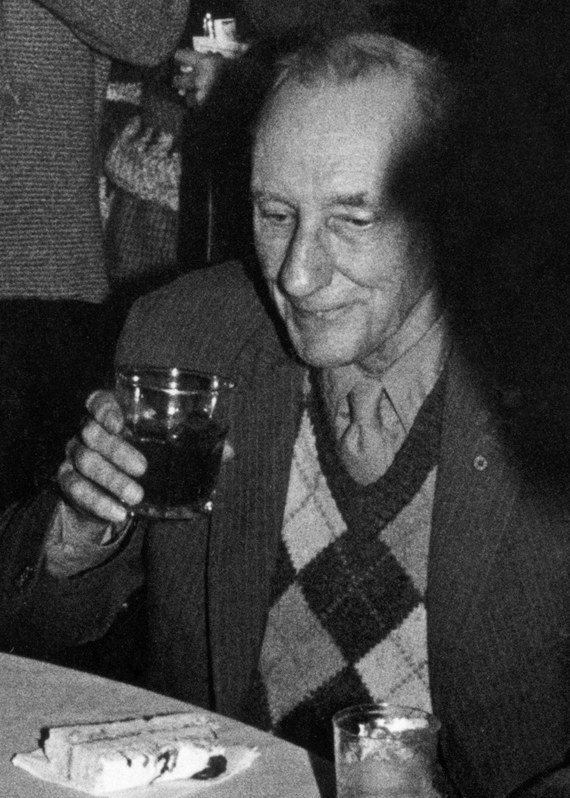
William S. Burroughs in 1983

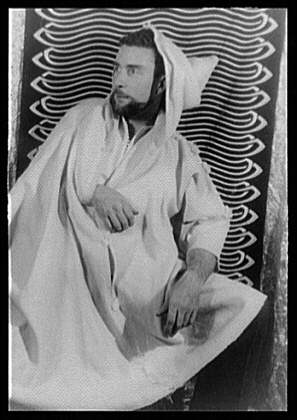
Brion Gysin

Writers and critics have compared certain methods of recombining text to musical remixing. William S. Burroughs used the cut-up technique associated with Brion Gysin. A 1998 review of Jeff Noon's short-story collection Pixel Juice described him as "Updating William Burroughs's cut-up technique with the sensibilities of contemporary music producers and remixers"; Noon reworks his own stories into "inventive variations on a theme", and several have "dub versions" compressed into forms such as haiku and limerick. In his 2001 book Cobralingus, Noon passed passages "sampled from another writer" through a sequence of "filter gates" inspired by techniques from experimental electronic music, a process he called "metamorphiction".

=== Other media ===
Writers on copyright and remix have treated the mashup as a visual counterpart to the musical remix: "a video or website which remixes and combines content from a number of different sources to produce something new and creative". Navas notes that remix "plays a vital role in mass communication, especially on the Internet". Such works are now a familiar part of amateur and professional online culture, though their legal status is often uncertain.

== Copyright ==
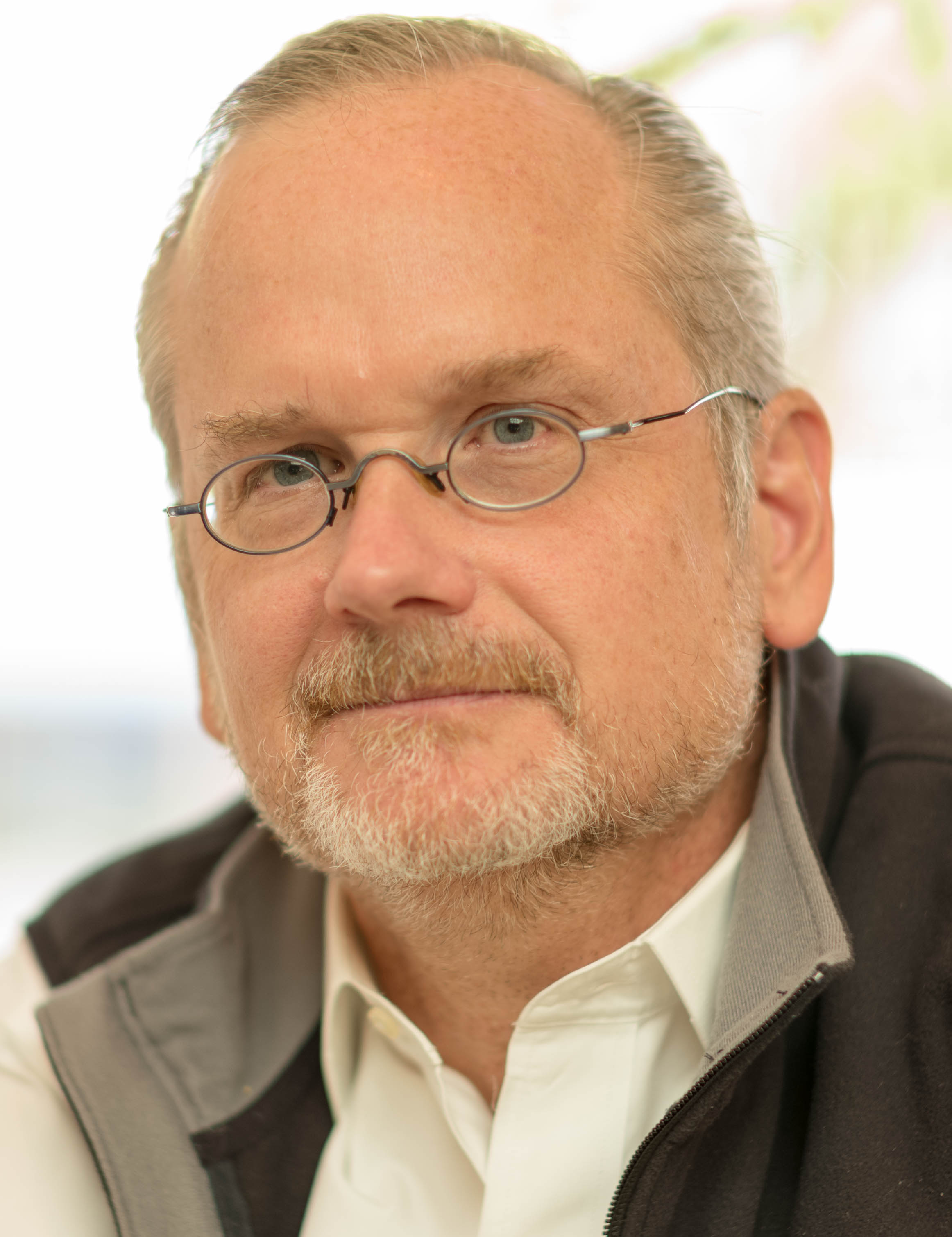
Lawrence Lessig in 2017

Because a remix is made from existing material, it often reproduces or adapts a work that is still in copyright. Under the copyright laws of many countries, the owner of a work generally has exclusive rights over its reproduction and adaptation, so a remix that takes a substantial part of the original may infringe unless the remixer has permission, uses a work released under an open licence, or can rely on a statutory exception or defence. Courts typically assess whether a substantial part has been taken by reference to its quality and importance to the original work, not merely the amount taken.

In the United States, some remixes may qualify as fair use, a doctrine that permits limited unlicensed use of copyrighted works in certain circumstances. Section 107 of the Copyright Act requires courts to consider four factors: the purpose and character of the use, including whether it is commercial or nonprofit and educational; the nature of the copyrighted work; the amount and substantiality of the portion used; and the effect of the use on the potential market for the original. There is no automatic rule that a non-profit or "transformative" remix is lawful: the Copyright Office notes that courts balance all four factors, and that not all nonprofit or noncommercial uses are fair.

In 2012, Canada introduced an exception for non-commercial user-generated content. A 2015 article in WIPO Magazine summarised the conditions as requiring that the use be solely non-commercial, that the source be mentioned, that the individual have a reasonable ground to believe the use is not infringing, and that the remix not have a "substantial adverse effect" on the exploitation of the existing work. In Lenz v. Universal Music Corp. (2013), a United States district court held that copyright owners must consider fair use before sending a takedown notice under the Digital Millennium Copyright Act.

Lawrence Lessig and other commentators have argued that default copyright rules, combined with the ease of copying digital works, subject everyday remixing to legal regulation, and have proposed clearer room for highly transformative or non-commercial reuse that does not compete with the original market. The Creative Commons organisation publishes standardised licences that allow copyright holders to permit sharing and adaptation of their work in advance, an approach Lessig has described as one way for remix artists to operate within the law; similar tools include the GNU General Public License. Lessig set out his account of remix culture in the 2008 book Remix.

In June 2015, Guilda Rostama wrote in WIPO Magazine that, given "today's 'remix' culture, and the legal uncertainty surrounding remixes and mash-ups, the time would appear to be ripe for policy makers to take a new look at copyright law".

== See also ==
- Appropriation (art)
- Assemblage
- Audio mixing
- Category:Remixers
- Ccmixter
- Computational musicology
- Gospel music
- Electronic dance music
- Internet meme
- Musical montage
- Plunderphonics
- Remix culture
- Rock music
- Sound collage
- WhoSampled
- Soul music
