= Joseph Cayre =

American businessman and real estate developer

- Born: Joseph Jack Cayre; August 1, 1941 (age 85); New York City, New York, U.S.
- Occupation: real estate developer
- Known for: co-founder of Salsoul Records co-founder of GoodTimes Entertainment co-founder of GT Interactive founder of Midtown Equities
- Spouse: Trina Cayre
- Children: Jack Cayre; Michael Cayre; Steven Cayre; Daniel Cayre; Grace Cayre
- Family: Stanley Cayre (brother); Kenneth Cayre (brother)

Joseph Jack Cayre (born August 1, 1941) is an American billionaire businessman and real estate developer. Together with his brothers he co-founded the record label Salsoul Records, video tape distributor and producer GoodTimes Entertainment, and video game publisher GT Interactive. He is also the founder and principal of the New York-based real estate development firm Midtown Equities.

== Early life and education ==
Born Joseph Jack Cayre to a Syrian Jewish family in Brooklyn but raised in Kansas City, Missouri until he was 8 and then Miami Beach, Florida until he was 20. His father owned a souvenir store in Miami Beach where Cayre worked as a teenager. He has two brothers: Stanley and Kenneth.

== Career ==
In 1959, Cayre and his brothers started their first business operating a duty-free retail store, the Paris Freeport Shop, on a cruise ship then owned by a friend that made a daily trip from Miami to the Bimini, Bahamas and back. They operated the store until 1967 when the ship was retired. Although still partners, the brothers engaged in separate business activities partnering with cousins from Mexico: Stan opened a textile factory in Puerto Rico Swan Tricot Mills; in 1963, Ken opened a ladies pantyhose factory, Kandy Mills, in Hialeah, Florida; and Joseph opened a plastic injection molding machine factory making 8-track cassette tape cartridges. When their cousins - who had purchased the exclusive 8-track distribution rights in Mexico for the Spanish music portfolio of RCA and CBS - had excess inventory, the Cayre brothers would sell it in Spanish language markets in the USA. After being requested to stop selling in the USA by both CBS and RCA (since the cousins only had the right to distribute in Mexico), the Cayre brothers, selling their textile interests to their Mexican cousins, purchased the exclusive 8-track Spanish language distribution rights from both CBS and RCA; within a year, they also acquired the same distribution rights for Spanish music LP records. In 1972, they founded their music distribution business, Caytronics Distributing in New York City.

=== Salsoul Records ===
As Salsa music was very popular in New York City owing to its large Puerto Rican population and the fact that their portfolio was mostly Mexican-oriented music, the Cayre brothers started their own Salsa focused record label called Mericana Records. They were able to sign Joe Bataan away from their main competitor, Fania Records; Bataan subsequently released an album called SalSoul (a combination of Salsa and Soul). The record was purchased by CBS Records for $100,000. They took the money and put together the Salsoul Orchestra in Philadelphia (with Earl Young on drums, Ronnie Baker on bass, Norman Harris and Bobby Eli on guitar, Bunny Sigler and Ron Kersey on keyboards, Vincent Montana, Jr. on vibes, and Larry Washington on the congas) and recorded three songs including the Salsoul Hustle which was an immediate hit. Their new label Salsoul Records focused on the dance market at the same time that Disco music was becoming popular. The label produced 8 to 10 records per month in the late 1970s. In 1976, Salsoul released the first commercially available 12-inch single, Double Exposure's Ten Percent. Salsoul Records also manufactured and distributed Gold Mind Records' output. Salsoul was affected by the disco backlash of 1979, but it was one of the few labels to survive after the death of disco. It continued to release new material until 1984 when the Cayre brothers shut down their recorded music operations to concentrate on the home video business.

=== GoodTimes Entertainment ===
In 1984, they founded GoodTimes Home Video Corporation (eventually renamed GoodTimes Entertainment) with 25 Public Domain video titles. They expanded into the production and distribution of low-priced fitness videos, although its most recognized line of products were a series of low-budget traditionally animated films. Many of its home-video titles (such as Aladdin, Beauty and the Beast, The Jungle Book, Hercules, Pocahontas, Cinderella, The Little Mermaid, Snow White, Thumbelina and The Hunchback of Notre Dame, among others) were named similarly or identically to big-budget animated films from Disney and other studios (though their plots were sometimes very different), and released close to the theatrical and/or home video releases of the major film studios. The Walt Disney Company sued GoodTimes in 1993, because the packaging of the GoodTimes videotapes closely resembled that of Disney's films, potentially confusing customers into buying a GoodTimes film when they thought they were buying a Disney film. As a result of the lawsuit, GoodTimes was required to print its name atop its VHS covers, but it was still allowed to produce animated films.

GoodTimes contracted with Columbia Pictures, NBC, Worldvision Enterprises, Hanna-Barbera, Orion Pictures, and Universal Studios to release inexpensive tapes of many of their films and programs for retail sale; GoodTimes also released several compilations assembled from public domain films, movie trailers, old television programs and newsreels (usually credited to Film Shows, Inc). They also had the exclusive retail contract with Wal-Mart leasing shelf space near the front of their stores. In July 2005, GoodTimes filed for bankruptcy and its assets were sold to Gaiam.

=== GT Interactive ===
In 1993, expanding from home video distribution, they founded GT Interactive, a video games distributor and publisher. In that same year, Doom was released as shareware eventually selling 2.9 million copies. In its first year, revenue reached $10.3 million. The company went public in 1995.

=== Midtown Equities ===
In 2000, Cayre founded Midtown Equities to expand and consolidate his real estate holdings. He is also co-founder and chairman of Core Group Marketing, a residential sales company. In early 2001, he partnered with Larry Silverstein and Lloyd Goldman to purchase the lease of the World Trade Center from the Port Authority of New York and New Jersey for $3.2 billion. The partnership was required to post $800 million in fees and down payments to win the deal. Goldman and Cayre posted a combined $110 million; Silverstein contributed $14 million; Westfield America contributed $127 million (Westfield controlled the retail mall at the trade center); and $563 million was borrowed from GMAC Financing. Goldman was to receive 25% of the management fees. In 2006, Goldman's share was increased to 50% and he will take over control of the project from Silverstein in 2016.

Midtown Equities is currently working on Midtown Miami, a $2.3 billion, 55-acre mega-project in Miami with 3,000 condominiums, 600,000 square feet (56,000 m^{2}) of retail space, and 200,000 square feet (19,000 m^{2}) of office space.

== Personal life ==
Cayre has been married to his wife Trina for 55 years and they have four sons and one daughter: Jack, Michael, Steven, Daniel, and Grace. Each of his sons is a partner in Midtown Equities. Cayre lives in Manhattan but also has homes in Brooklyn, in Deal at the Jersey Shore, and Aventura, Florida. In 2007, he sold his house in Midwood, Brooklyn for $10 million, at the time one of the most expensive sales in the borough. His son, Jack Cayre, is a co-founder of the CORE Group, a New York-based, full-service real estate brokerage firm. His nephew, Robert "Bobby" Cayre (son of Stanley), founded Aurora Capital Associates in 2001.
