= Locker Room (album) =

Studio album by Double Exposure
- Released: 1979
- Recorded: Sigma Sound, Philadelphia, Pennsylvania
- Genre: Soul, Philadelphia soul, disco
- Label: Salsoul
- Producer: Ron Baker, Bruce Hawes, Ron Kersey, Bunny Sigler

Double Exposure chronology
| Fourplay (1978) | Locker Room (1979) |

Locker Room is the third studio album recorded by American male vocal quartet Double Exposure, released in 1979 on the Salsoul label.

== History ==
The album features the song, "I Got the Hots for Ya", which peaked at No. 33 on the Hot Soul Singles chart. It also peaked at No. 37 on the Hot Dance/Disco chart.

== Track listing ==
Side one
| No. | Title | Writer(s) | Length |
|---|---|---|---|
| 1. | "I Got the Hots (For Ya)" | Ron Baker | 6:59 |
| 2. | "(Where Have You Been) All My Life" | Ron Baker | 3:58 |
| 3. | "Can We Be in Love" | Pat Cooper, Bruce Hawes | 6:02 |

Side two
| No. | Title | Writer(s) | Length |
|---|---|---|---|
| 4. | "Ice Cold Love" | Jerry Akines, Johnny Bellmon, Buddy Turner | 6:03 |
| 5. | "I Wish That I Could Make Love to You" | Bunny Sigler, Jimmy Sigler | 5:45 |
| 6. | "Why Do We Have to Go Our Separate Ways" | Ron Kersey, Cheryl Dickerson | 6:01 |

== Personnel ==
- Leonard "Butch" Davis, Charles Whittington, Joseph Harris, James Williams – vocals
- Keith Benson, Scotty Miller – drums
- Jimmy Williams, Raymond Earl, Ron Baker – bass
- Ron Kersey, Cotton Kent, Bruce Hawes, Bunny Sigler, Dennis Richardson, Bruce Gray, Luther Randolph – keyboards
- Norman Harris, Bobby Eli, T.J. Tindall, Edward Moore – guitars
- Larry Washington, James Walker, Bobby Conga – congas
- Ron Tyson – percussion
- The Don Renaldo Strings and Horns – strings, horns on "I Got the Hots (For Ya)"
- Reubin Henderson, Harold Watkins, Prestly Williams – horns
- Walter Gibbons – tambourines, cowbell on "Ice Cold Love" and "I Wish That I Could Make Love to You"
- Evette Benton, Carla Benson, Barbara Ingram – background vocals

== Production ==
- Ron Baker, Bruce Hawes, Ron Kersey, Bunny Sigler – producers
- Joe Cayre, Stan Cayre, Ken Cayre – executive producers
- Carl Paruolo, Dirk Devlin, Kenny Present, Rocky Schnaars – engineers
- Jeff Stewart, Jay Mark – technicians
- Bob Blank – mixing
- Stanley Hochstadt – art direction
- Lori Lambert – design
- Belott/Wolfson Photography – photography
- Lloyd Gelassen – graphic supervision

== Charts ==
Singles

| Year | Single | Peak chart positions | |
| Year | Single | US R&B | US Dan |
|---|---|---|---|
| 1979 | "I Got the Hots for Ya" | 33 | 37 |
