= Ten Percent =

Studio album by Double Exposure
- Released: 1976
- Recorded: Sigma Sound, Philadelphia, Pennsylvania
- Genres: Soul, Philadelphia soul, disco
- Label: Salsoul
- Producers: Norman Harris, Bruce Hawes, Ron Baker, Earl Young, Vincent Montana, Jr.

Double Exposure chronology
Ten Percent (1976)	Fourplay (1978)

Professional ratings
Review scores
Source	Rating
AllMusic	4.5/5 stars

Ten Percent is the debut studio album recorded by American male vocal quartet Double Exposure, released in 1976 on the Salsoul label.

== History ==
The album features the title track, which peaked at No.2 on the Hot Dance Club Play chart, No. 54 on the Billboard Hot 100 and No. 63 on the Hot Soul Singles chart. Also featured are two other chart singles: "My Love Is Free" and "Everyman (Has to Carry His Own Weight)". The album was remastered and reissued with bonus tracks in 2012 by Big Break Records.

== Track listing ==
Side one
No.	Title	Writer(s)	Length
1.	"Ten Percent"	Allan Felder, T.G. Conway	6:51
2.	"Gonna Give My Love Away"	Scott Hawes, James Hendricks	3:04
3.	"Everyman"	Allan Felder, Bunny Sigler	7:27

Side two
No.	Title	Writer(s)	Length
4.	"Baby I Need Your Loving"	Holland–Dozier–Holland	5:26
5.	"Just Can't Say Hello"	Vincent Montana, Jr., Ron Walker	3:10
6.	"My Love Is Free"	Allan Felder, T.G. Conway	7:00
7.	"Pick Me"	Allan Felder, Bruce Gray, Lettie Holden	3:20

2012 remastered reissue bonus tracks
No.	Title	Length
8.	"Ten Percent" (Walter Gibbons 12" Disco Mix)	9:42
9.	"Everyman (Has to Carry His Own Weight)" (Joe Claussell 12" Disco Mix)	9:54
10.	"My Love Is Free" (Tom Moulton 12" Disco Mix)	9:39
11.	"Ten Percent" (Single Version)	3:03
12.	"Everyman (Has to Carry His Own Weight)" (Single Version)	2:43
13.	"My Love Is Free" (Single Version)	4:22

== Personnel ==
- Leonard "Butch" Davis, Charles Whittington, Joseph Harris, James Williams – vocals
- Earl Young – drums
- Ron Baker – bass
- Vincent Montana Jr. – vibes
- Larry Washington – congas
- Norman Harris, Bobby Eli, T.J. Tindall – guitars
- Carlton Kent, Ron Kersey, Bunny Sigler, T.G. Conway, Bruce Hawes – keyboards
- Robert Hartzell, Rocco Bene – trumpets
- Robert Moore, Edward Cascarella, Richard Genovese, Frederick Joiner – trombones
- Jeffery Kirschen, Milton Phibbs – French horns
- John Wilson – flugelhorn
- Don Renaldo (Christine Reeves, Americus Mungiole, Rudolph Malizia, Lance Elbeck, Charles Apollonia, Richard Jones) – violins
- Anthony Sinagoga, Davis Barnett, Peter Nocella – violas
- Romeo Di Stefano, Larry Gold, Patricia Weimer – cellos
- Bunny Harris – tambourine
- Barbara Ingram, Evette Benton, Carla Benson – background vocals

== Production ==
- Norman Harris, Bruce Hawes, Ron Baker, Earl Young, Vincent Montana, Jr. – producers
- Joe Cayre, Stan Cayre, Ken Cayre – executive producers
- Carl Paruolo, Arthur Stoppe, Jim Gallagher, Kenny Present, Jeff Stewart, Peter Humphreys, Dirk Devlin – engineers
- Walter Gibbons, Ken Cayre – mixing
- Al Brown mastering
- Allan Tannenbaum – cover photography
- Hank Dunning – backline photography
- Karen Bernath – design
- Paula Bisacca – art direction

== Charts ==
Chart (1976)	Peak
U.S. Billboard Top LPs	129
U.S. Billboard Top Soul LPs	40

Singles

Year	Single	Peak chart positions		
Year	Single	US	US R&B	US Dan
1976	"Ten Percent"	54	63	2
1976	"My Love Is Free"	104	44	15
1976	"Everyman (Has to Carry His Own Weight)"	—	84	8
