= Fourplay (Double Exposure album) =

Studio album by Double Exposure
- Released: 1978
- Studio: Sigma Sound, Philadelphia, Pennsylvania; Alpha International, Philadelphia, Pennsylvania
- Genre: Philadelphia soul
- Label: Salsoul
- Producer: Norman Harris, Ron Tyson, Bunny Sigler, Ron Kersey, Bruce Hawes

Double Exposure chronology
Ten Percent (1976)	Fourplay (1978)	Locker Room (1979)

Fourplay is the second studio album by American male vocal quartet Double Exposure, released in 1978 on the Salsoul label.

== History ==
The album features the song "Newsy Neighbors", which failed to chart. One other single, "Perfect Lover", was released. It also failed to chart.

== Critical reception ==
Professional ratings
Review scores
Source	Rating
AllMusic	3/5 stars

The Bay State Banner called the album "a typical Philadelphia production, and some of the arrangements sound like they were taken off the assembly line... But you do hear 'Singing' on this record rather than chanting or background warbling, and that's one thing to be thankful for."

== Track listing ==
Side one
No.	Title	Writer(s)	Length
1.	"I Declare War"	Norman Harris, Jimmy Hendricks, Mikki Farrow	5:55
2.	"Handy Man"	Ron Tyson, Edward Moore	2:58
3.	"Why Do You Have to Leave"	Bunny Sigler	4:16
4.	"Falling in Love"	Ron Tyson, Edward Moore	5:26

Side two
No.	Title	Writer(s)	Length
5.	"Newsy Neighbors"	Norman Harris, Allan Felder	4:52
6.	"Perfect Lover"	Jerry Akines, Johnny Bellmon, Buddy Turner	5:03
7.	"There Is No Reason"	Bruce Gray	4:25
8.	"There's Something Missing"	Brian Evens, Mel Hugee, Gene Hendricks	4:38

== Personnel ==
- Leonard "Butch" Davis, Charles Whittington, Joseph Harris, James Williams – vocals
- Keith Benson, Scotty Miller – drums
- Jimmy Williams, Raymond Earl – bass
- Ron Kersey, Cotton Kent, Bruce Hawes, Bunny Sigler, Dennis Richardson, Bruce Gray – keyboards
- Norman Harris, Bobby Eli, T.J. Tindall, Edward Moore – guitars
- Larry Washington, James Walker – congas
- Ron Tyson – percussion
- Bunny Harris – tambourine
- The Don Renaldo Strings and Horns – strings, horns
- Evette Benton, Carla Benson, Barbara Ingram – background vocals

== Production ==
- Norman Harris, Ron Tyson, Bunny Sigler, Ron Kersey, Bruce Hawes – producers
- Carl Paruolo, Dirk Devlin, Kenny Present, Rocky Schnaars – engineers
- Jeff Stewart, Jay Mark – technicians
- José Rodriguez – mastering
- Stanley Hochstadt – art direction
- Michael Nelson – photography
- Lloyd Gelassen – graphic supervision
