= Joe Bataan =

American singer and musician (born 1942)

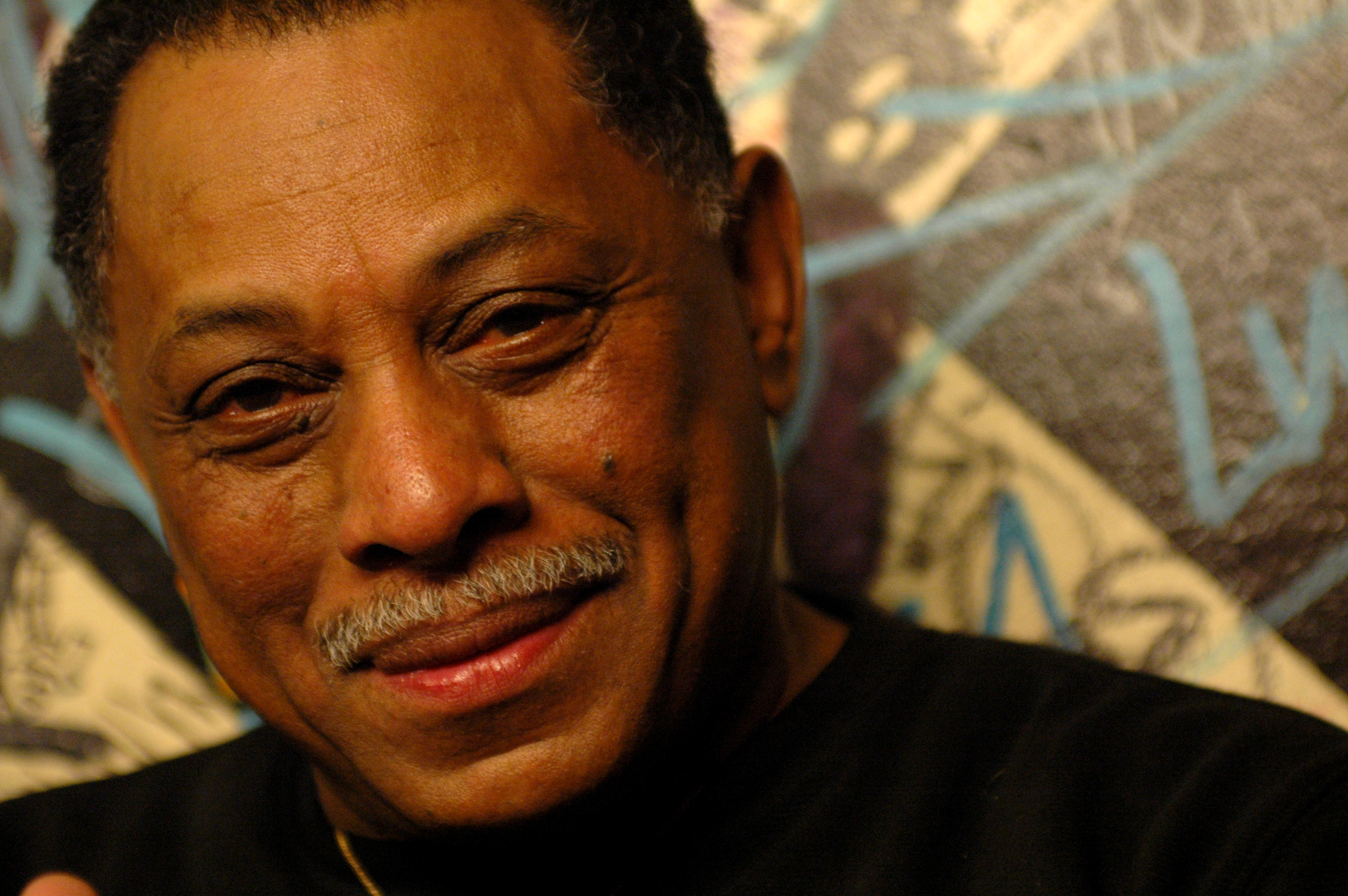
- Bataan in 2006

Background information
- Born: Bataan Nitollano; 15 November 1942 (age 83); Spanish Harlem, New York City, U.S.
- Genres: Boogaloo, Latin, Latin soul, salsa, Latin jazz, groove, funk, disco, R&B, hip hop
- Occupations: Singer, musician, producer, film actor
- Instruments: Piano, vocals
- Years active: 1950–present
- Label: Fania Records

Bataan Nitollano, also known as Joe Bataan (born 15 November 1942), is a Afro-Filipino-American Latin soul singer, songwriter and musician best known world-wide and in the Hispanic and Latino music scene as the "King of Latin Soul".

== Early life ==
Bataan Nitollano was born in New York City, United States in 1942, and grew up in the 103rd Street and Lexington Avenue part of East Harlem in New York. He is the son of a Filipino father and African-American mother and he grew up in Spanish Harlem.

== Career ==
In 1966, he formed his first band, Joe Bataan and the Latin Swingers. Bataan's music was influenced by two musical styles: the Latin boogaloo and African American doo-wop. Though Bataan was neither the first nor only artist to combine doo-wop-style singing with Latin rhythms, his talent for it drew the attention of Fania Records. After signing a record contract with them in 1966, Bataan released Gypsy Woman in 1967. (The title track is a Latin dance cover of "Gypsy Woman" by the Impressions). He would, in full, release eight original titles for Fania which included the gold-selling Riot!. These albums often mixed energetic Latin dance songs, sung in Spanish, with slower, English-language soul ballads sung by Bataan himself. As a vocalist, Bataan's fame in the Latin music scene at the time was only rivaled by Ralfi Pagan.

Disagreements over money with Fania Records head Jerry Masucci led Bataan to eventually leave the label. While still signed to Fania however, Bataan secretly started Ghetto Records, a Latin music label which got its initial funding from a local gangster, George Febo. Bataan produced several albums for other artists, including Papo Felix, Paul Ortiz and Orquesta Son and Eddie Lebron.

In 1973, he helped coin the phrase "salsoul", lending its name to his first post-Fania album. He recorded three albums for the Salsoul of Cayre brothers, (Kenneth, Stanley, and Joseph) and several singles, including "Rap-O Clap-O" from 1979 which became an early hip hop hit. After his 1981 album, Bataan II, he retired from music-making to spend more time with his family and ended up working as a youth counselor in one of the reformatories he himself had spent time in as a teenager.

In 2005, Bataan teamed up with producer Daniel Collás to break his long hiatus with the release of Call My Name, a well-received album recorded in New York for Spain's Vampi Soul label.

In early 2009, Bataan was featured in the Kenzo Digital-produced "beat cinematic" City of God's Son. Bataan was featured as the narrator of the story, playing the part of an older Nas reflecting upon his youth in the street with cohorts Jay-Z, Ghostface Killah, Biggie and Raekwon.

In 2013, Bataan received the Lifetime Achievement Award from the New York chapter of the Filipino American National Historical Society.

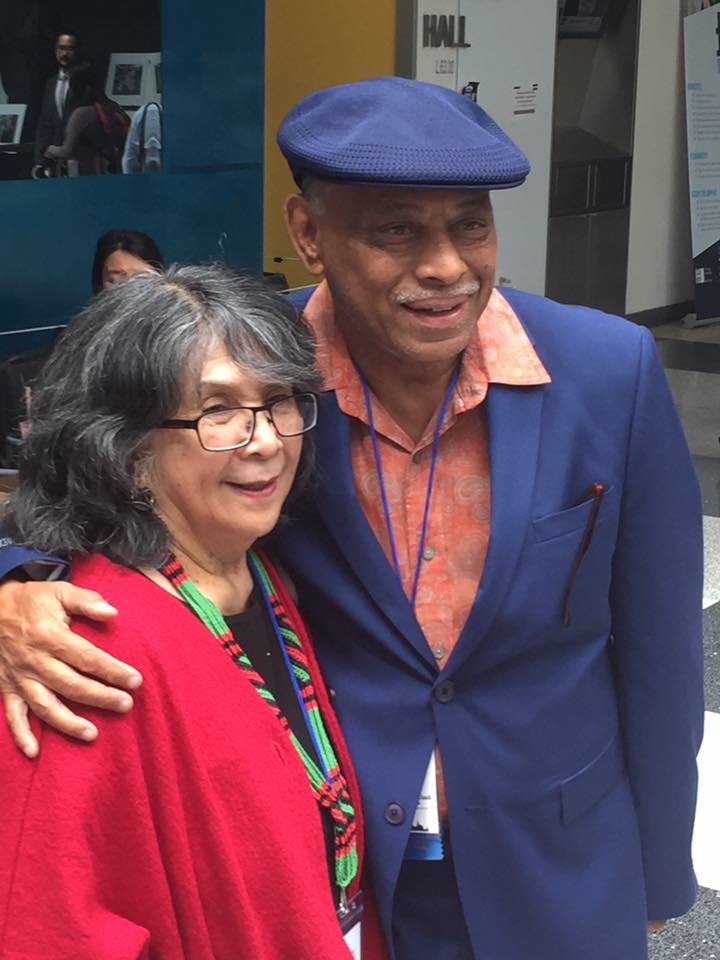
Bataan with Dorothy Cordova (founder of Filipino American National Historical Society at the 2016 FANHS Conference in New York City

In 2014, he met Osman Jr, from French group Setenta which, in collaboration with promoter Benjamin Levy, leads him to play for the first time in Paris in June 2015 at Le théatre des Etoiles, followed by a historic live at the Jazz Mix de Vienne in France. In September 2015, Bataan sang "My Rainbow", a soulful bolero composed by the French band. This title was released in 2016 on the album Paris to Nueva York released by Latin Big Note. With Setenta as this backing band, Bataan travels and plays on famous scenes as Selma in Stockholm (Sweden), Ronnie Scott's (London), the FGO (Paris), the Summer Stage in New York and the Théatre de la Mer of Fiest'a Sète (France).

In 2016, Bataan (along with the Barrio Boys) performed at the FANHS National Conference in New York- where 500 conference attendees danced to his music while cruising the Hudson River on the Hornblower 'Infinity'.

In 2017, Bataan appeared in the Puerto Rican-American film "Shine", and he collaborated with Spanglish Fly, the boogaloo revival group based in New York City, to record New York Rules, written by Manuel Garcia-Orozco and Jonathan Goldman, released on the band's Ay Que Boogaloo! album by record label Chaco World Music. Singing lead vocals, Bataan includes references to his famous songs "Subway Joe" and "Rap-O Clap-O." The Huffington Post calls this recording "charming, spellbinding and irresistible." A remix of the song is included on the soundtrack to She's Gotta Have It (2019), written and directed by Spike Lee.

In 2024, Bataan, along with other artists as Ozomatli and Puro Bandido headlined for the festival Latin Rock on the Dock in Vallejo, California.

== Personal life ==
Bataan is married to Yvonne Bataan; their daughter is singer Asia Nitollano.

== Discography ==
Studio albums

- 1967: Gypsy Woman (Fania 340; CD reissue: Emusica/UMG 773 130 114, 2007)
- 1968: Subway Joe (Fania 345; CD reissue: Emusica/UMG 773 130 113, 2007)
- 1968: Riot! (Fania 354; CD reissue: Emusica/UMG 773 130 001, 2006)
- 1969: Poor Boy (Fania 371)
- 1969: Singin' Some Soul (Fania 375; CD reissue: Emusica/UMG 773 130 374, 2008)
- 1970: Mr. New York and the East Side Kids (Fania 395; CD reissue: Emusica/UMG 773 130 092, 2006)
- 1972: Sweet Soul (Fania 407)
- 1972: The Song of... Joe Bataan (Fania 411) compilation
- 1972: Saint Latin's Day Massacre (Fania 420; CD reissue: Emusica/UMG 773 130 070, 2006)
- 1973: Bataan In San Frantasia (unreleased, scheduled as Fania 432)
- 1974: Salsoul (Mericana 124; CD reissue: Charly CDGR-184, 1997)
- 1975: Afro-Filipino (Salsoul/Epic KE-33471; CD reissue: Charly CDGR-185, 1997)
- 1980: Mestizo (Salsoul 8534) includes "Rap-O Clap-O"
- 1981: Bataan II (Salsoul 8549)
- 1997: Last Album, Last Song (Bataan Music)
- 2002: Latin Funk Brother (Vampi Soul [Spain] 012) compilation
- 2004: The Best (Fania 805) compilation
- 2004: Young, Gifted & Brown (Joe's Sweetest Soul Singin') (Vampi Soul [Spain] 062) compilation
- 2005: Call My Name (Vampi Soul [Spain] 065)
- 2006: The Message (ITP [Germany] 8920)
- 2008: Under the Streetlamps (Anthology 1967–1972) (Emusica/UMG 773 130 378) compilation
- 2009: King of Latin Soul (Vampi Soul [Spain] 111)
- 2016: "My Rainbow" on the album, Paris To Nueva York by Setenta (Latin Big Note)
- 2017: "New York Rules" on the album, Ay Que Boogaloo! by Spanglish Fly (Chaco World Music)

== Filmography ==
- Un Dia Divino (1973)
- Driver Parrell Lines (2006)
- Alex Paddu Love Talk (2015)
- We Like It Like That (2016) documentary on the history of latin boogaloo
- Shine (2017)

== See also ==
- Filipino hip hop
- Chicano rap
- Latin hip hop
- Latin American music in the United States
