= Ten Percenter =

Canadian political flyer

In Canadian politics, a Ten Percenter is a party political flyer that MPs have the right to mail — at no cost to themselves — to households in their own ridings, equivalent to 10% of the households in their constituency. They may also send the same flier to all of their constituents if they change 50% of the copy.

Prior to March 2010, MPs were allowed to send ten percenters into their opponents' ridings. A motion by Michael Ignatieff to have the practice disallowed passed by a slim majority. There was a minority government at the time. Conservatives voted overwhelmingly against this motion and vowed to ignore it. In 2010 the practice of sending tax payer funded propaganda into their opponents riding was banned by the House of Commons Board of Internal Economy.

In 2008 and 2009, most Yukoners received what was essentially the same flier except for a small block of very tiny copy in one corner of each rider. This was how Conservative politicians were able to get around the 10% rule.

While ten percenters are in theory supposed "to keep Canadians informed on the important activities undertaken on their behalf by their elected representatives" Ten Percenters are sometimes viewed as controversial, because public money is used to promote the MP's political party.

== 2009 Controversies ==
During debate on the cancellation of the controversial Long-Gun Registry, a ten percenter was sent by the Conservatives to citizens in the Nova Scotia riding of Sackville—Eastern Shore MP Peter Stoffer, stating that the NDP MP had “worked to support the (long gun) registry” when, in fact, he has been opposed to the registry since its inception 12 years ago. Peter Milliken, Speaker of the House of Commons, admonished the Conservatives sternly for this tactic, and that the issue will be sent to a House Committee on the issue for a more detailed examination.

A new controversy broke out in November 2009, regarding ten percenters when the Conservative Party sent out a mailing "targeting ridings with large Jewish communities" accusing "the Liberal Party of participating in the 2001 World Conference against Racism in Durban, South Africa, which the pamphlets describe as overtly anti-Semitic, and of supporting what they view as the terrorist groups Hamas and Hezbollah. The flyers go after Liberal Leader Michael Ignatieff for accusing Israel of committing war crimes".
