= Walter Gibbons =

- Born: April 2, 1954
- Origin: Brooklyn, New York, United States
- Died: September 23, 1994 (aged 40)
- Genres: Disco, garage
- Occupations: DJ, remixer
- Years active: 1970s–80s
- Labels: Salsoul, West End, Gold Mind, Sleeping Bag

Walter Gibbons (April 2, 1954 – September 23, 1994) was an American record producer, early disco DJ, and remixer. He helped pioneer the remix and 12" single in America, and was among the most influential New York DJs of the 1970s.

== Career ==
Gibbons began DJing in New York in the early 1970s, and was among the first Americans to incorporate techniques from dub reggae production into dance music. In 1975 he began DJing at the Manhattan club Galaxy 21; he would become a regular there. He left Galaxy 21 in late 1976 after he discovered his sets were being secretly recorded and sold on the black market. Unable to find a new regular club that would accept his sound, in 1977 he briefly moved to Seattle to be resident DJ at a newly established venue, The Monastery. From Seattle, he returned to New York and to DJ at various venues and events.

He also enjoyed a long association with Salsoul Records at the end of the 1970s. His DJ skills, punctuality and seriousness convinced Salsoul to assign him the remix of "Ten Percent", by Double Exposure, even though he had never produced. It became the first commercially available 12-inch single in the world, and his best-known remix. His remix of "Hit and Run" by Loleatta Holloway was a surprise hit. He released Salsoul mixes such as Disco Boogie: Super Hits for Non-Stop Dancing (1976) and Disco Madness (1979), the latter being the first full-length release by a solo remixer. He also worked on labels such as West End and Gold Mind.

Gibbons was largely inactive in the early 1980s, but returned in 1984 with his biggest hit, a mix of Strafe's "Set It Off", which became an anthem of the early New York garage scene. In 1986 he released a remix of Arthur Russell's "Schoolbell/Tree House" for Sleeping Bag Records. Gibbons became a reborn Christian in the 1980s, but still managed to turn out cutting edge mixes during this period (he simply focused on songs and lyrics that did not offend his beliefs). Despite becoming isolated from the New York dance scene and some of his friends, he was warmly received after he embarked on a small tour of Japan in 1993.

He spent his final weeks living alone in a YMCA, and died of AIDS-related symptoms in 1994.

== Legacy ==
His remixes were posthumously compiled on the triple-CD compilation Mixed with Love (2004) and the 2-CD Jungle Music (2010). The first feature Gibbons' Salsoul mixes of tracks by the likes of Loleatta Holloway, The Salsoul Orchestra, Double Exposure, First Choice, Love Committee and Anthony White among others. Jungle Music compiles a wider scope of his work.

== Style and influence ==
Gibbons, along with hip hop pioneer Kool DJ Herc, was among the first American musicians to apply elements of Jamaican dub production to disco and dance music. Like Arthur Russell, who recorded with him, Gibbons "used dub as a dislocating device, preventing disco's simple groove from developing under the dancers' feet." His mixes focused more on percussion than melody, and "stretched out the grooves so much that they teetered on the edge of motionlessness." He was also among the first to beat-juggle between two copies of the same record. According to AllMusic, "utterly transformed with the addition of echo/reverb effects borrowed from dub and drum breaks, [his] singles influenced dozens of producers (and DJs)." Gibbons was known as "the DJ's DJ" because his peers would go out of their way to hear him play.

Gibbons was an important part of the early 1970s New York City disco underground scene, influencing garage and house music DJs like Frankie Knuckles and Larry Levan. He also laid the foundations for early 1980s experimental Chicago house music. One of the early pioneers of beat-mixing, and known for considerably more skillful mixing than many better-known DJs at the time, he is cited by many early pioneers of the house-music scene as an influence. His "Disco Blend" remix of Double Exposure's "Ten Percent" was once described by UK DJ Ashley Beedle as providing a "blueprint for house music".

The 1996 album Walter's Room was Black Science Orchestra's homage to Gibbons, released in London on Junior Boy's Own Records.

== Discography ==
=== Compilations ===
- Mixed with Love: The Walter Gibbons Salsoul Anthology (Salsoul, 2004)
- Jungle Music - Mixed With Love: Essential & Unreleased Remixes 1976-1986 (Strut, 2010)
