= Double Exposure (band) =

Philadelphia-based disco group

- Origin: Philadelphia, United States
- Genres: Disco
- Years active: 1961–present
- Label: Salsoul
- Members: Leonard "Butch" Davis; Joe Harris; Kenny Pitt; James Burris
- Past members: Jimmy Williams; Charles Whittington; Lorenzo Bell
- Website: www.doubleexposuremusic.com

Double Exposure is an American, Philadelphia-based disco group. They are best known for their 1976 hit, "Ten Percent".

== History ==
The group formed in 1961 with Leonard "Butch" Davis, Charles Whittington, Jimmy Williams and Joe Harris. They were originally known as the United Image and released two singles, "Love's Creeping Up on Me" on Stax Records in 1971 and "The African Bump" on Branding Iron Records in 1972.

They were signed to Salsoul Records in 1975 and released their debut album, Ten Percent in 1976. The album featured the title track, which was remixed by Walter Gibbons and reached No. 54 on the Billboard Hot 100 and No. 2 on the dance/disco charts. The tracks "Everyman (Has to Carry His Own Weight) and "My Love Is Free" were also popular club songs.

In 2001, a dance group called M&S used samples from Double Exposure's "Everyman" in their song called "Salsoul Nugget".

In September 2008, they recorded new material an Eli/Dixon/Green composition called "Soul Recession"/Soultronics Records at Eli's Studio E (The Grooveyard) facility in Philadelphia. Some original Salsoul/Philly/TSOP (The Sound of Philadelphia)/MFSB (Gamble and Huff) session musicians have appeared on "Soul Recession", including Earl Young, Bobby Eli, Dennis Harris, T.G. Conway, Jimmy Williams and Rikki Hicks.

Jimmy Williams died in October 2016.

In 2018, new members Kenny Pitt and Lorenzo Bell are performing with the original band members to keep the Double Exposure sound alive.

In 2022 Salsoul re-released the "Ten Percent" album and is also available for streaming.

In 2024 James Burris became the newest member replacing Lorenzo Bell.

== Discography ==
=== Studio albums ===
Year	Title	Peak chart positions		Record label
Year	Title	US	US R&B	Record label
1976	Ten Percent	129	40	Salsoul
1978	Fourplay	—	—	Salsoul
1979	Locker Room	—	—	Salsoul
"—" denotes a recording that did not chart.

=== Compilations ===
- The Best of Double Exposure (Charly, 1999)
- The Anthology (Suss'd, 2006)
- My Love Is Free: The Best of Double Exposure (Koch, 2006)

=== Singles ===
Year	Single	Peak chart positions			Album
Year	Single	US	US R&B	US Dan	Album
1976	"Ten Percent"	54	63	2	Ten Percent
1976	"My Love Is Free"	104	44	15	Ten Percent
1976	"Everyman (Has to Carry His Own Weight)"	—	84	8	Ten Percent
1978	"Newsy Neighbors"	107	—	—	Fourplay
1978	"Perfect Lover"	—	—	—	Fourplay
1979	"I Got the Hots for Ya"	—	33	37	Locker Room
1982	"After All This Time"	—	—	57	Non-album single
"—" denotes a recording that did not chart or was not released in that territory.
