= Ten Percent (song) =

Single by Double Exposure

from the album Ten Percent
- Released: May 1976
- Length: 6:51 (album version); 9:42 (12" version); 3:05 (7" version)
- Label: Salsoul Records
- Songwriters: Allan Felder, T.G. Conway
- Producer: Norman Harris

Double Exposure singles chronology
"Ten Percent" (1976)	"My Love Is Free" (1976)

"Ten Percent" (also written as "Ten Per Cent") is a disco song written by Allan Felder and T.G. Conway and recorded by Double Exposure. Originally released on the band's 1976 album of the same name, "Ten Percent" was later remixed by Walter Gibbons for a single released on Salsoul Records, the label's eighth ever release. Gibbons's remix of "Ten Percent" was the first commercially available 12-inch single.

The 12-inch single was reserved for DJs until the release of "Ten Percent." Disco had already begun to exploit the 12-inch's allowance for higher volumes, better sound quality, and longer playing time, but no record companies had previously seen commercial value in the new format.

== Production ==
Ken Cayre, the head of Salsoul Records, decided to sign a number of famous musicians and bands to the label, hoping to "consolidate the success of the faceless Salsoul Orchestra", and Double Exposure was chosen as the newly signed band whose first release, "Ten Percent," would feature the orchestra and be promoted with a 12-inch single as well as the typical seven-inch format. Walter Gibbons was a DJ, not a producer, but his innovative skills, along with his punctuality and serious nature, got Gibbons the "Ten Percent" assignment at Salsoul Records. One of his original techniques was "taking two records and working them back and forth in order to extend the drum breaks," a technique he applied to the "Ten Percent" mix, which displeased the original songwriter, Allan Felder, but which was supported by Salsoul in the front-page story in which Billboard magazine covered the release. It was "mostly an exercise in stretching the original track out," and Gibbons transformed it from a "four-minute song into a nine-minute-forty-five-second-cut-and-paste roller coaster."

== Public reaction ==
When Gibbons first played the "Ten Percent" 12" remix at Galaxy 21, where he was a regular DJ. One witness said, "It sounded so new, going backwards and forwards. It built and built like it would never stop. The dance floor just exploded."

== Chart history ==
Chart (1976)	Peak position
US R&B Singles	63
US Billboard Hot 100	54
US Hot Dance Club Play Singles	2

== Release ==
- Release Date: May, 1976
- Album Jacket: 4-colors, with a center window showing the record's label
- Price: $2.98
- Speed: 45 rpm
- Publicity: front-page stories in Billboard magazine and Record World

== Effects on dance music ==
"Ten Percent" was a "dancefloor stormer that radically changed the disco underground in terms of record production." The release "signalled the rise of remixers", and the rise of the DJ.
