= Salsoul Records =

US record label based in New York City

- Parent company: BMG Rights Management
- Founded: 1974
- Founder: Joseph Cayre; Kenneth Cayre; Stanley Cayre
- Genre: Disco, R&B, soul music, funk, latin music, post-disco
- Country of origin: United States
- Location: New York City, U.S.
- Official website: salsoulrecords.co

Salsoul Records is an American record label, founded by three brothers, Joseph, Kenneth, and Stanley Cayre. Based in New York City, Salsoul issued about 300 singles, including many disco/post-disco 12-inch releases, and a string of albums in the 1970s and early 1980s.

The label started in business in 1974, went defunct in 1985 and was relaunched in 1992. Artists such Skyy, Double Exposure, Love Committee(Gold Mind), Moment of Truth

Bethlehem Music Company's catalogs, which included Salsoul Records, Bethlehem Records (a jazz label) and others, were licensed by Verse music group from 2010 for five years, before Verse's catalogs were bought out by BMG Rights Management in 2015.

== History ==
=== Origin of name ===
The label's name was conceived by artist Joe Bataan, who recorded some of the earliest sessions for the Cayre brothers before the label's formation. "Salsoul" was street lingo for the musical culture of urban Latinos who were listening to soul music and combining it with salsa music. Bataan chose the name for an LP he made for the Cayre brothers. Bataan had the first single, "The Bottle", and album, Afro-filipino, on the initial Salsoul label released through Epic, before a deal with RCA.

=== 1970s: Influence from Philly soul ===
Ken Cayre sought session musicians to play Philly soul. He worked with the key session players for Gamble and Huff's Philadelphia International Records label and its predecessor, Gamble-Huff Productions, founding members of the MFSB Orchestra on Philadelphia International.

Gamble and Huff were in dispute with their key musicians over business matters and Salsoul quickly took the chance to put them under contract. Among these Philly soul artists were Vince Montana (orchestral arrangements and vibes), Norman Harris (lead and rhythm guitar, arrangements, songwriting and production), Ronnie Baker (bass guitar, arrangement and production), Earl Young (drums and percussion), Bunny Sigler and others. Earl Young's 16 beat of the hi-hat cymbal originated a staple '70s disco beat for dancers. Baker would create a thunderous bass sound, exemplified on the record "Love is the Message" by MFSB.

Baker, Harris and Young had the girl group First Choice under contract and they brought them along to Salsoul. Led by Rochelle Fleming, the group had success on the Philly Groove label with Armed and Extremely Dangerous (1973), which Salsoul acquired and would re-release among its classic catalogue in the 1990s. For Salsoul, First Choice would go on to record songs like "Doctor Love" and "Let No Man Put Asunder".

Montana wrote, arranged, and produced second single and the first Salsoul hit, "Salsoul Hustle" (1975) by the newly formed Salsoul Orchestra, which included members of the Philly session players. During the following years, the label enjoyed a string of hits, but Salsoul's biggest successes came in the later years, as the company moved from disco to funk. Instant Funk reached the top of the Billboard R&B chart (No. 20 pop) in 1979 with "Got My Mind Made Up", a million-seller produced by Bunny Sigler, with the group's follow-up album also going gold. Cayre brothers also produced Flashlight (Philly Groove Records).

According to Ken Cayre, it was his exposure to early discothèques that gave him the idea to record music for the dance market. Salsoul released the first commercially available 12-inch single, Double Exposure's "Ten Percent", in 1976. Salsoul was affected by the disco backlash of 1979, but it was one of the few labels to survive after the death of disco. It continued to release new material until 1984, when the Cayre brothers shut down their recorded music operations to concentrate on the home video business, such as GoodTimes Entertainment.

== See also ==
- List of record labels
- Prelude Records
