= 1974 in music =

List of notable events in music that took place in the year 1974.

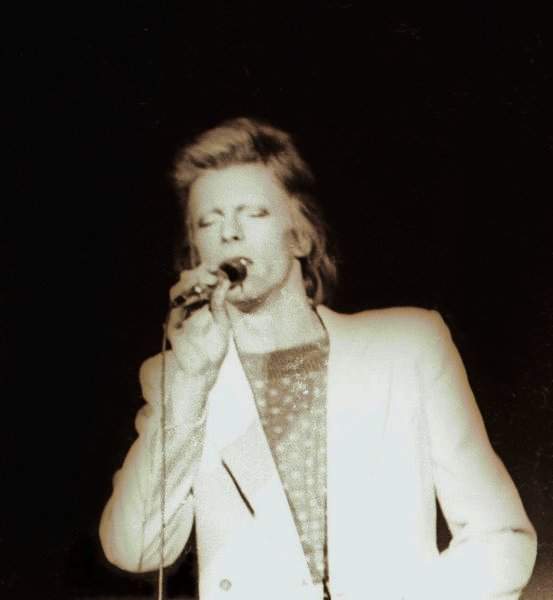
David Bowie in 1974

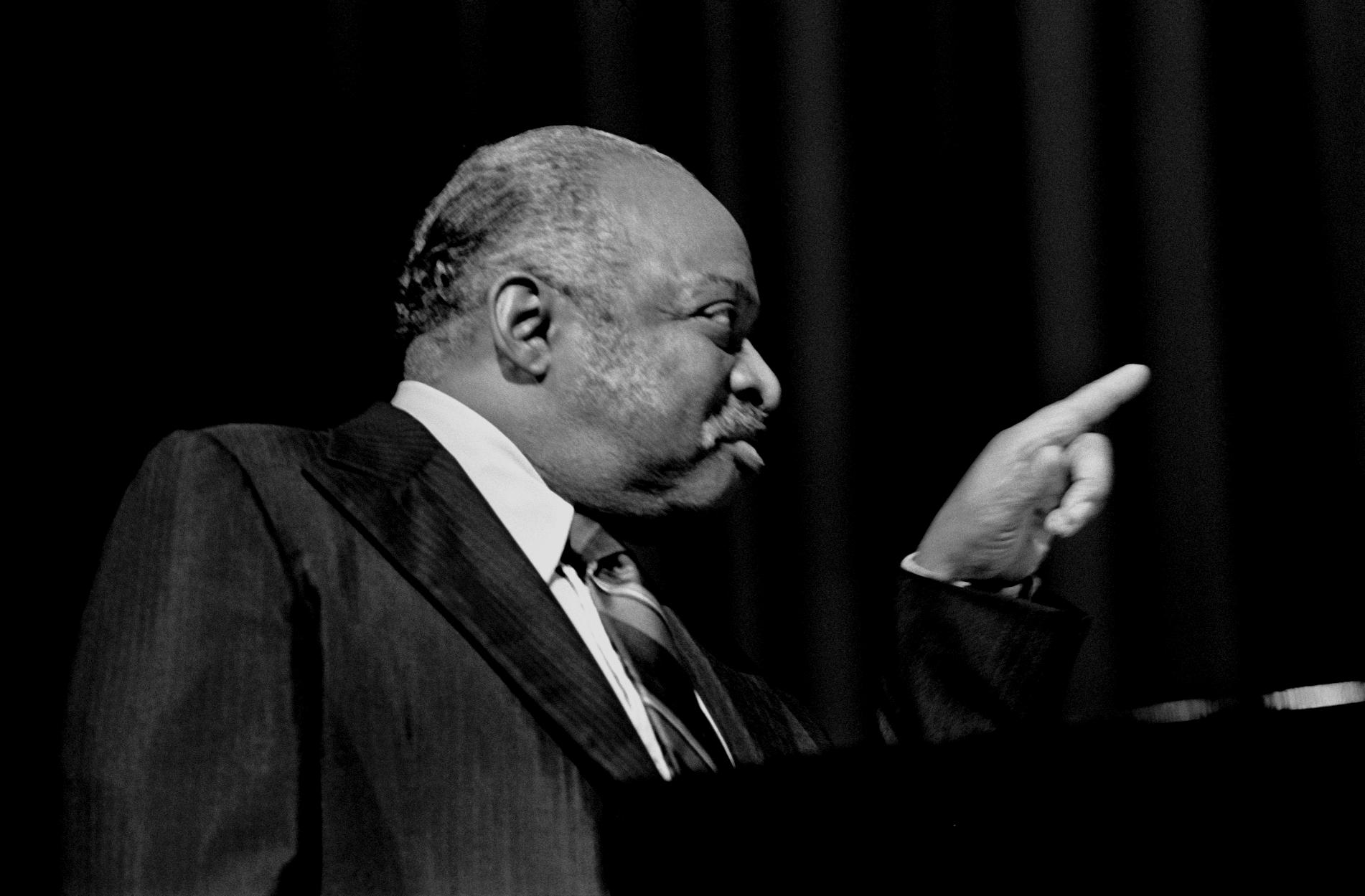
Count Basie in 1974

== Specific locations ==
- 1974 in British music
- 1974 in Japanese music
- 1974 in Norwegian music
- 1974 in Scandinavian music

== Specific genres ==
- 1974 in country music
- 1974 in heavy metal music
- 1974 in jazz
- 1974 in progressive rock

== Events ==
=== January–April ===
- January 1 – English jazz musician John Dankworth is named CBE in the United Kingdom's New Year's Honours List. Other musicians honoured include Charles Mackerras (CBE) and organist Gordon Archbold Slater (OBE)
- January 3 – Bob Dylan and The Band begin their 40-date concert tour at Chicago Stadium. It is Dylan's first tour since 1966.
- January 17
  - Joni Mitchell releases her album Court and Spark, supported by the single "Help Me".
  - Dino Martin, singer and son of Dean Martin, is arrested on suspicion of possession and sale of two machine guns.
- February 12 – New York's rock club The Bottom Line opens in Greenwich Village. The first headlining act is Dr. John.
- February 16 – Two years of litigation between Grand Funk and former manager Terry Knight are finally resolved. The band gets the rights to its name but Knight wins a cash settlement.
- February 19 – The first American Music Awards are broadcast on ABC, two weeks before the Grammys. Helen Reddy and Jim Croce are among the winners.
- February 20 – Cher files for divorce from her husband of 10 years, Sonny Bono.
- February 22 – The English Chamber Orchestra conducted by Raymond Leppard performs the world premiere of Three Regions from Terrain by Douglas Young.
- February 27 – The Württemberg Chamber Orchestra Heilbronn, conducted by Jörg Faerber, makes its English debut at the Queen Elizabeth Hall, London.
- March 2 – The 16th Annual Grammy Awards are presented in Los Angeles, hosted by Andy Williams. Stevie Wonder's Innervisions wins Album of the Year, while Roberta Flack's version of "Killing Me Softly With His Song" wins both Record of the Year and Song of the Year. Bette Midler wins Best New Artist.
- March 3
  - Elvis Presley played two shows at the Houston Astrodome, breaking attendance records with 44,000 at the evening show.
- March 4
  - Ivan Stepanov and His Balalaikas make their London debut at the Wigmore Hall.
  - Baritone Hermann Prey cuts short a vocal recital in the Royal Festival Hall, London, due to vocal fatigue.
- March 10 – Hans Vonk makes his London debut in the Royal Festival Hall, conducting the Royal Philharmonic Orchestra in a programme of Berlioz and Schubert, as well as the Violin Concerto by Roberto Gerhard, with Erich Gruenberg as soloist.
- March 12 – John Lennon is involved in an altercation with a photographer outside The Troubadour in Los Angeles. Lennon and friend Harry Nilsson have been heckling comedian Tommy Smothers and are forced to leave the club.
- March 16 – Country music's Grand Ole Opry moves to a new location at the Opryland USA theme park in Nashville, Tennessee
- March 31 – Record producer Phil Spector is badly injured in a car accident in Hollywood, details of which are largely suppressed at the time.
- April 5 – Van Halen play their first show on the Sunset Strip in Hollywood at Gazzarri's.
- April 6
  - 200,000 music fans attend The California Jam rock festival. Artists performing at the event include Emerson, Lake & Palmer, Black Sabbath, Deep Purple, Black Oak Arkansas and the Eagles.
  - Swedish group ABBA wins the 19th Eurovision Song Contest in The Dome, Brighton, England, with the song "Waterloo", kickstarting their international career. The 1967 Eurovision winner, Sandie Shaw, attends.
- April 14 – Ladies and Gentlemen: The Rolling Stones, a concert film made during the Rolling Stones' 1972 North American Tour, premieres at the Ziegfeld Theatre in New York.
- April 16 – Queen play their first North American concert, opening for Mott the Hoople in Denver, Colorado.
- April 20 - "TSOP (The Sound of Philadelphia)" by MFSB reaches number one on the Billboard Hot 100 in the United States for the first of two weeks. It is considered the first Disco song to reach number one. As it was commissioned, composed, and recorded specifically to be used as the theme for the syndicated television program Soul Train where it debuted in October 1973, it is also the first television theme song of the rock era to reach that position.
- April 24–25 – Music aired on the radio in Portugal acts as a secret signal to trigger the Carnation Revolution there: at 10:55 p.m. on April 24, Paulo de Carvalho's "E Depois do Adeus" (Portugal's entry in the 1974 Eurovision Song Contest) on Emissores Associados de Lisboa alerts rebel captains and soldiers that the coup is beginning; at 12:20 a.m. on April 25, Rádio Renascença broadcasts "Grândola, Vila Morena", a song by José Afonso, an influential political folk singer-songwriter, signalling the Armed Forces Movement (MFA) to begin the takeover of strategic points of power in the country from 3.00 a.m.
- April 25
  - Sotheby's Galleries in London sell a violin made in 1733 by Cremonese master Giuseppe Guarneri, formerly belonging to violinist Elaine Weldon, for the equivalent of $140,000, the second-highest price ever paid for a violin.
  - Pam Morrison, Jim Morrison's widow, is found dead in her Hollywood apartment from an apparent heroin overdose.

=== May–December ===
- May 7 – Led Zeppelin announces their new record label, Swan Song Records, with a lavish party at The Four Seasons Hotel in New York.
- May 25 – Twenty years after it was recorded, "Rock Around the Clock" by Bill Haley and His Comets returns to the Billboard top 40, after it gains renewed popularity from its use in the film American Graffiti and the TV series Happy Days.
- May 28 – Experimental orchestra, the Portsmouth Sinfonia, plays a concert at the Royal Albert Hall, with its regular conductor John Farley. The performers included Michael Nyman and Brian Eno.
- June 1 – Kevin Ayers, John Cale, Brian Eno, Nico and other musicians perform at the Rainbow Theatre in London. The performances are later released as June 1, 1974.
- June 5
  - Sly Stone married model-actress Kathy Silva on June 5, 1974, during a sold-out performance at Madison Square Garden.
  - Patti Smith records "Hey Joe", her debut single, which was released in August.
- June 14 – David Bowie launches his Diamond Dogs tour at the Montreal Forum. One year previously he had announced that he was retiring from touring as Ziggy Stardust.
- July 4 – Barry White marries Love Unlimited lead singer Glodean James.
- July 19–21 – Ozark Music Festival is held in Sedalia, Missouri, with a crowd estimated between 100,000 and 350,000 people.
- July 20 – The first Knebworth Concert is held in England, headlined by The Allman Brothers Band.
- July 29
  - Having performed at two sold-out concerts at the London Palladium, "Mama" Cass Elliot dies in her sleep after suffering a heart attack in a Mayfair flat in London, aged 30.
  - Neil Peart officially joins Rush.
- August 7
  - During a performance of Carmina Burana, conducted by André Previn, at The Proms, soloist Thomas Allen collapses because of the heat and eventually has to be carried out by members of the orchestra. Prommer Patrick McCarthy, just embarking on his professional singing career, offers his services as a replacement and completes the performance.
  - Peter Wolf, lead singer of The J. Geils Band, marries actress Faye Dunaway.
- August 16 – Ramones' first appearance on NYC's venue CBGB. The venue would help establish their place at the forefront of punk rock.
- September 15 – Gary Thain of Uriah Heep is electricuted on stage at the Moody Coliseum in Dallas, Texas, and is seriously injured.
- October 5
  - AC/DC performs at the Brighton Le-Sands Masonic Hall in Sydney, Australia its first official show with Bon Scott as its new lead singer.
  - The North Coast Band Invitational competition, sponsored by St. Ann's CYO Band of Neponset, is held for the first time, at Nickerson Field on the Boston University campus.
- October 18 – Al Green is attacked while bathing by a girlfriend of several weeks, Mrs. Mary Woodson, a 29-year-old mother of three. She scalds his body with a pan of boiling grits and commits suicide a few moments later, reportedly because he rejected her marriage proposal.
- October 24 - Seiji Ozawa conducts the New Japan Philharmonic in a Concert for Peace at the United Nations General Assembly in New York City.
- November 2 – George Harrison launches his "George Harrison & Friends North American Tour" in Vancouver. It is the first North American tour by a former Beatle since the band's August 1966 tour.
- November 21 – Wilson Pickett is arrested in Andes, New York, after allegedly firing a bullet through the door of a hotel room where he was staying while on a hunting trip with The Isley Brothers.
- October 26 – The 3rd OTI Festival, held at the Teatro Juan Ruiz de Alarcón of the Centro de Convenciones in Acapulco, Mexico, is won by the song "Hoy canto por cantar", written by Ricardo Ceratto and Nydia Caro, and performed by Caro herself representing Puerto Rico.
- November 28 – John Lennon joins Elton John on stage at Madison Square Garden for three songs.
- December 12 – Mick Taylor leaves The Rolling Stones after six years.
- December 31
  - Lindsey Buckingham and Stevie Nicks join Fleetwood Mac.
  - The third annual New Year's Rockin' Eve, moving this year from NBC to ABC, is aired with performances by Herbie Hancock, The Beach Boys, Chicago, Olivia Newton-John and The Doobie Brothers.

=== unknown date ===
- Lord Shorty's Endless Vibrations is the first soca LP and the first major soca hit worldwide.
- Eric Bogle's "And the Band Played Waltzing Matilda" comes to prominence when he enters it in a National Folk Festival songwriting competition in Brisbane, Australia.
- Rover Thomas claims to have been visited in a dream by a deceased friend near Warmun, Australia, and receives the Krill Krill song cycle.
- The original Alice Cooper group breaks up. The band's leader, Vincent Furnier, changes his name to Alice Cooper and goes on to a solo career.
- Journey signs to Columbia Records.
- Roland RE-201 and 101 Space Echo tape-based audio delay effects units introduced.

== Bands formed ==
- See Category:Musical groups established in 1974

== Bands disbanded ==
- The Moody Blues (reformed in 1977)
- The Stooges (reformed in 2003)
- King Crimson (reformed in 1981)

== Albums released ==
=== January ===
Day	Album	Artist	Notes
2	Elvis: A Legendary Performer Volume 1	Elvis Presley	Compilation
2	Wild Tales	Graham Nash	-
3	The Phosphorescent Rat	Hot Tuna	-
4	Manhole	Grace Slick	-
6	Energized	Foghat	-
10	Coast to Coast: Overture and Beginners	Rod Stewart / Faces	Live
10	Windfall	Ricky Nelson & The Stone Canyon Band	-
11	Hotcakes	Carly Simon	-
11	Lookin' for a Love Again	Bobby Womack	-
17	Planet Waves	Bob Dylan	-
17	Court and Spark	Joni Mitchell	-
30	The Way We Were	Barbra Streisand	-
-	Blue Magic	Blue Magic	-
-	Different Drum	Linda Ronstadt	Compilation
-	Grievous Angel	Gram Parsons	-
-	Musik von Harmonia	Harmonia	-
-	The Payback	James Brown	-
-	Rhapsody in White	The Love Unlimited Orchestra	-
-	Sundown	Gordon Lightfoot	-

=== February ===
Day	Album	Artist	Notes
1	It's Too Late to Stop Now	Van Morrison	Live
1	What Were Once Vices Are Now Habits	The Doobie Brothers	-
8	Here Come the Warm Jets	Brian Eno	
8	Jolene	Dolly Parton	-
8	The Silent Corner and the Empty Stage	Peter Hammill	-
13	That's a Plenty	Pointer Sisters	-
14	Valentine	Roy Harper	-
15	Burn	Deep Purple	-
15	Old New Borrowed and Blue	Slade	-
18	Kiss	Kiss	-Debut
20	Phaedra	Tangerine Dream	-
20	Pretzel Logic	Steely Dan	-
25	Let Me in Your Life	Aretha Franklin	-
26	Lady of the Night	Donna Summer	Netherlands-only release
-	Badfinger	Badfinger	-
-	Being (album)	Wigwam	
-	If We Make It Through December	Merle Haggard	-
-	Living and Dying in 3/4 Time	Jimmy Buffett	-
-	Love Song	Anne Murray	-
-	A New Life	Marshall Tucker Band	-
-	Pure Music	Chase	-
-	Radio City	Big Star	-
-	Rock 'n' Roll Animal	Lou Reed	Live
-	Saints & Sinners	Johnny Winter	-
-	Skeletons from the Closet: The Best of Grateful Dead	Grateful Dead	Compilation
-	Slaughter on 10th Avenue	Mick Ronson	-
-	Thunderbox	Humble Pie	-
-	Todd	Todd Rundgren	-
-	Twin Peaks	Mountain	Live
-	Unborn Child	Seals and Crofts	-

=== March ===
Day	Album	Artist	Notes
1	Mirage	Camel	-
1	Hatfield and the North	Hatfield and the North	Debut Album
1	Shinin' On	Grand Funk Railroad	-
1	Zinc Alloy and the Hidden Riders of Tomorrow	T.Rex	-
4	Waterloo	ABBA	-
6	Hard Labor	Three Dog Night	-
8	Queen II	Queen	-
8	Kansas	Kansas	Debut
11	Chicago VII	Chicago	-
15	Get Your Wings	Aerosmith	-
15	Pure Smokey	Smokey Robinson	-
18	Another Lonely Song	Tammy Wynette	-
18	Rush	Rush	Debut/Canada
20	Good Times	Elvis Presley	-
21	Buddha and the Chocolate Box	Cat Stevens	-
22	On the Border	Eagles	-
22	Apostrophe	Frank Zappa	-
25	Open Our Eyes	Earth, Wind & Fire	-
28	The Golden Scarab	Ray Manzarek	-
29	The Hoople	Mott the Hoople	-
29	Starless and Bible Black	King Crimson	-
-	Somethin's Happening	Peter Frampton	-
-	Alive & Kicking	The Delfonics	-
-	Buffy	Buffy Sainte-Marie	-
-	Hollies	The Hollies	-
-	Mighty Love	The Spinners	-
-	Now We Are Six	Steeleye Span	-
-	Seven	Bob Seger	-
-	Slow Dancer	Boz Scaggs	-
-	Phases and Stages	Willie Nelson	-
-	Refugee	Refugee	-

=== April ===
Day	Album	Artist	Notes
1	Meet The Residents	The Residents	-
3	Live European Tour	Billy Preston	Live
5	Ragged Old Flag	Johnny Cash	-
5	Secret Treaties	Blue Öyster Cult	-
5	Don't Be Fooled by the Name	Geordie	-
6	+'Justments	Bill Withers	-
8	Desitively Bonnaroo	Dr. John	-
12	Do It Good	KC and the Sunshine Band	-
12	Seven	Poco	-
13	Paul Simon in Concert: Live Rhymin'	Paul Simon	
15	Second Helping	Lynyrd Skynyrd	-
19	Big Fun	Miles Davis	-
19	Caravan and the New Symphonia	Caravan	Live
19	Seven Secrets	Fruupp	-
19	Son of Dracula	Harry Nilsson	Soundtrack
20	Bridge of Sighs	Robin Trower	-
24	On Stage	Loggins and Messina	Live
26	Sweet Fanny Adams	Sweet	-
30	Houston (I'm Comin' to See You)	Glen Campbell	-
30	I Want to See the Bright Lights Tonight	Richard and Linda Thompson	-
30	Okie	J.J. Cale	-
-	Carolina County Ball	Elf	UK
-	Positive Vibrations	Ten Years After	-
-	Exotic Birds and Fruit	Procol Harum	-
-	Fall into Spring	Rita Coolidge	-
-	Gracias a la Vida	Joan Baez	Spanish language
-	Home, Home on the Road	New Riders of the Purple Sage	Live
-	Live 'n' Kickin'	West, Bruce and Laing	Live
-	Midnight Mushrumps	Gryphon	-
-	Riding High	Chilliwack	-
-	Road Food	The Guess Who	-
-	Skin Tight	Ohio Players	-
-	Unconditionally Guaranteed	Captain Beefheart & the Magic Band	-
-	Zephyr National	Tom Fogerty	-

=== May ===
Day	Album	Artist	Notes
1	Kimono My House	Sparks	-
3	Journey to the Centre of the Earth	Rick Wakeman	
3	Quo	Status Quo	-
5	The Kids & Me	Billy Preston	-
8	Preservation Act 2	The Kinks	-
8	Sweet Exorcist	Curtis Mayfield	-
10	Too Much Too Soon	New York Dolls	-
15	Live at Caesars Palace	Diana Ross	Live
15	Monkey Grip	Bill Wyman	Debut
17	In for the Kill	Budgie	-
17	Phenomenon	UFO	-
24	Diamond Dogs	David Bowie	-
24	Bad Company	Bad Company	Debut
27	Unrest	Henry Cow	-
28	If You Love Me, Let Me Know	Olivia Newton-John	-
28	Sheet Music	10cc	-
30	The Night the Light Went On in Long Beach	Electric Light Orchestra	Live
-	Rampant	Nazareth	
-	Hamburger Concerto	Focus	-
-	Mr. Natural	Bee Gees	
-	Back to Oakland	Tower of Power	-
-	Body Heat	Quincy Jones	-
-	Boogity Boogity	Ray Stevens	-
-	The Confessions of Dr. Dream and Other Stories	Kevin Ayers	-
-	Dark Lady	Cher	-
-	L'isola di niente	Premiata Forneria Marconi	-
-	Lotus	Santana	Live
-	Rags to Rufus	Rufus	-
-	Rhinos, Winos and Lunatics	Man	-
-	Shock Treatment	Edgar Winter	-
-	Slapp Happy	Slapp Happy	-
-	Spooky Lady's Sideshow	Kris Kristofferson	-
-	Winter in America	Gil Scott-Heron	-

=== June ===
Day	Album	Artist	Notes
2	The Psychomodo	Cockney Rebel	-
5	Garcia	Jerry Garcia	-
7	In My Life	Cilla Black	-
8	Paradise and Lunch	Ry Cooder	-
14	Everyone Is Everybody Else	Barclay James Harvest	-
15	Back Home Again	John Denver	-
19	Marvin Gaye Live!	Marvin Gaye	Live
20	Before the Flood	Bob Dylan & The Band	Live
24	Caribou	Elton John	-
24	Endless Summer	The Beach Boys	Compilation
24	Long Live Love	Olivia Newton-John	-
26	Holiday	America	-
27	From the Mars Hotel	Grateful Dead	-
27	Aqua	Edgar Froese	-
28	Hell	James Brown	-
28	June 1, 1974	Kevin Ayers, John Cale, Brian Eno, and Nico	-
-	Axe Victim	Be-Bop Deluxe	-
-	Cicero Park	Hot Chocolate	-
-	Land's End	Jimmy Webb	-
-	Only Want You For Your Body	Buffalo	-
-	Remember Me This Way	Gary Glitter	Live
-	Solid	The Groundhogs	-
-	Stars & Stripes Forever	Nitty Gritty Dirt Band	Live
-	Toby	The Chi-Lites	-
-	Walking Man	James Taylor	-
-	Wonderworld	Uriah Heep	-
-	Mysterious Traveller	Weather Report	

=== July ===
Day	Album	Artist	Notes
3	Up for the Down Stroke	Parliament	-
5	Another Time, Another Place	Bryan Ferry	-
19	On the Beach	Neil Young	-
22	Fulfillingness' First Finale	Stevie Wonder	-
22	Machine Gun	Commodores	-
26	Rock Bottom	Robert Wyatt	-
-	Irish Tour '74	Rory Gallagher	Live
-	Turn of the Cards	Renaissance	
-	461 Ocean Boulevard	Eric Clapton	-
-	Elvis Recorded Live on Stage in Memphis	Elvis Presley	Live
-	Avalanche	Mountain	-
-	I'm Leaving It All Up to You	Donny and Marie Osmond	-
-	Miami	James Gang	-
-	Mirror Image	Blood, Sweat & Tears	-
-	Phoebe Snow	Phoebe Snow	-
-	Rejuvenation	The Meters	-
-	Small Talk	Sly & the Family Stone	-
-	Some Nice Things I've Missed	Frank Sinatra	-
-	Truck Turner	Isaac Hayes	Soundtrack

=== August ===
Day	Album	Artist	Notes
6	Can't Get Enough	Barry White	-
7	I Can Stand a Little Rain	Joe Cocker	-
9	Feats Don't Fail Me Now	Little Feat	-
9	Perfect Angel	Minnie Riperton	-
13	Live at the Opera House	Pointer Sisters	Live
19	Porter 'n' Dolly	Porter Wagoner and Dolly Parton	-
19	Pussy Cats	Harry Nilsson	-
19	So Far	Crosby, Stills, Nash & Young	Compilation
20	Do It Baby	The Miracles	-
20	Live It Up	The Isley Brothers	-
22	Paper Lace	Paper Lace	US
30	Hergest Ridge	Mike Oldfield	
30	New Skin for the Old Ceremony	Leonard Cohen	
-	Welcome Back My Friends to the Show That Never Ends... Ladies and Gentlemen	Emerson, Lake & Palmer	Live
-	Greatest Hits	Alice Cooper	Compilation
-	AWB	Average White Band	-
-	Country	Anne Murray	Compilation
-	Light of Love	T.Rex	US only; compilation plus new material
-	Verities & Balderdash	Harry Chapin	-
-	Merle Haggard Presents His 30th Album	Merle Haggard	-
-	Not Fragile	Bachman–Turner Overdrive	-
-	Sailor	Sailor	Debut
-	Slow Flux	Steppenwolf	-
-	Tooth Fang & Claw	Ted Nugent and The Amboy Dukes	-
-	We Had It All	Scott Walker	-
-	Men Opening Umbrellas Ahead	Vivian Stanshall	-

=== September ===
Day	Album	Artist	Notes
5	Dancing Machine	The Jackson 5	-
6	Hall of the Mountain Grill	Hawkwind	-
6	Rocka Rolla	Judas Priest	Debut
6	Rollin'	Bay City Rollers	-
6	Thrust	Herbie Hancock	-
9	Tarzana Kid	John Sebastian	-
10	Good Old Boys	Randy Newman	-
10	Roxy & Elsewhere	Frank Zappa and The Mothers of Invention	Live
13	Heroes Are Hard to Find	Fleetwood Mac	-
13	I've Got My Own Album to Do	Ronnie Wood	Solo Debut
13	Late for the Sky	Jackson Browne	-
13	Look at the Fool	Tim Buckley	-
13	Nightbirds	Labelle	-
16	Starting Over	Raspberries	-
16	Love Is Like a Butterfly	Dolly Parton	-
20	Beaded Dreams Through Turquoise Eyes	Redbone	-
24	McGear	Mike McGear	-
25	Nightmares...and Other Tales from the Vinyl Jungle	The J. Geils Band	-
27	Serenade	Neil Diamond	-
-	David Essex	David Essex	-
-	Eldorado	Electric Light Orchestra	-
-	The Power and the Glory	Gentle Giant	-
-	Sally Can't Dance	Lou Reed	-
-	1969: The Velvet Underground Live	The Velvet Underground	Live
-	Tina Turns the Country On!	Tina Turner	-
-	Slipstream	Sherbet	-
-	Felix Cavaliere	Felix Cavaliere	-
-	Good Things Happening	Brotherhood of Man	-
-	Hard Core Poetry	Tavares	-
-	Ladies Love Outlaws	Tom Rush	-
-	Light of Worlds	Kool & The Gang	-
-	No Other	Gene Clark	-
-	Peace on You	Roger McGuinn	-
-	The Ramblin' Man	Waylon Jennings	-
-	Sneakin' Sally Through the Alley	Robert Palmer	Solo Debut
-	Streetlights	Bonnie Raitt	-
-	Windows	Jon Lord and Eberhard Schoener	Live
-	When the Eagle Flies	Traffic	-
-	Where Have I Known You Before	Return to Forever	-
-	Wrap Around Joy	Carole King	-
-	Hot Wire	Trapeze	

=== October ===
Day	Album	Artist	Notes
1	Fear	John Cale	-
1	Barry Manilow II	Barry Manilow	-
1	ButterFly	Barbra Streisand	-
2	Al Green Explores Your Mind	Al Green	-
4	From the Album of the Same Name	Pilot	-
4	The Impossible Dream	The Sensational Alex Harvey Band	-
4	Odds & Sods	The Who	Outtakes and rarities compilation
4	Smiler	Rod Stewart	-
4	Todd Rundgren's Utopia	Utopia	-
4	Walls and Bridges	John Lennon	-
4	You	Gong	-
4	Veedon Fleece	Van Morrison	-
7	Living in the 70's	Skyhooks	-
11	Lost in a Dream	REO Speedwagon	-
11	Paper Money	Montrose	-
11	Rock and Roll Outlaws	Foghat	-
11	Streetlife Serenade	Billy Joel	-
14	War Child	Jethro Tull	-
15	The Heart of Saturday Night	Tom Waits	-
18	It's Only Rock 'n Roll	The Rolling Stones	-
19	War Babies	Hall & Oates	-
22	Hotter Than Hell	Kiss	-
25	Crime of the Century	Supertramp	-
25	Natty Dread	Bob Marley	-
25	This Is The Moody Blues	The Moody Blues	compilation
29	David Live	David Bowie	Live
-	Man of Miracles	Styx	-
-	Borboletta	Santana	-
-	Climax	Ohio Players	-
-	Dancehall Sweethearts	Horslips	-
-	Dragon Fly	Grace Slick / Paul Kantner / Jefferson Starship	-
-	The Gregg Allman Tour	Gregg Allman	-
-	Guitar Solos	Fred Frith	Debut
-	Homeless Brother	Don McLean	-
-	Inspiration Information	Shuggie Otis	-
-	It'll Shine When It Shines	Ozark Mountain Daredevils	-
-	Just a Boy	Leo Sayer	-
-	The Mirror	Spooky Tooth	-
-	Mother Lode	Loggins and Messina	-
-	Not Just Another Bunch of Pretty Faces	If	-
-	Quatro	Suzi Quatro	-
-	Red	King Crimson	
-	Reunion: The Songs of Jimmy Webb	Glen Campbell	-
-	Slow Motion	Man	-
-	Souvenirs	Dan Fogelberg	-
-	A Stranger in My Own Back Yard	Gilbert O'Sullivan	-
-	Waitress in a Donut Shop	Maria Muldaur	-

=== November ===
Day	Album	Artist	Notes
1	Autobahn	Kraftwerk	-
1	Cantamos	Poco	-
1	Fly to the Rainbow	Scorpions	-
1	Silk Torpedo	The Pretty Things	-
2	Love Me for a Reason	The Osmonds	
8	Elton John's Greatest Hits	Elton John	Compilation
8	Encore: Live in Concert	Argent	Live
8	Nightlife	Thin Lizzy	-
8	The Prince of Heaven's Eyes	Fruupp	-
8	Saturnight	Cat Stevens	Japan; Live
8	Sheer Heart Attack	Queen	-
8	Stormbringer	Deep Purple	
11	Propaganda	Sparks	-
15	Country Life	Roxy Music	-
15	Desolation Boulevard	Sweet	-
15	Goodnight Vienna	Ringo Starr	-
15	Wish You Were Here	Badfinger	-
16	Kung Fu Fighting and Other Great Love Songs	Carl Douglas	Debut
18	The Butterfly Ball and the Grasshopper's Feast	Roger Glover	-
19	Heart Like a Wheel	Linda Ronstadt	-
22	The Lamb Lies Down on Broadway	Genesis	-
22	Get Up with It	Miles Davis	-
25	John Dawson Winter III	Johnny Winter	-
25	Woman to Woman	Tammy Wynette	-
29	Bluejeans & Moonbeams	Captain Beefheart	-
29	Fire on the Mountain	Charlie Daniels Band	-
29	Relayer	Yes	-
29	Slade in Flame	Slade	-
-	7-Tease	Donovan	-
-	Brujo	New Riders of the Purple Sage	-
-	Country Heart 'N Soul	Freddie Hart	-
-	Do It ('Til You're Satisfied) (album)	B. T. Express	Debut
-	Fire	Ohio Players	-
-	Got to Find a Way	Curtis Mayfield	-
-	Highly Prized Possession	Anne Murray	-
-	Live	Mott the Hoople	Live
-	Miles of Aisles	Joni Mitchell	Live
-	Myopia	Tom Fogerty	-
-	Out of the Storm	Jack Bruce	-
-	Sedaka's Back	Neil Sedaka	Compilation
-	Soon Over Babaluma	Can	-
-	Taking Tiger Mountain (By Strategy)	Brian Eno	-
-	There's the Rub	Wishbone Ash	-
-	Where We All Belong	Marshall Tucker Band	Double LP; half studio, half live

=== December ===
Day	Album	Artist	Notes
5	Rufusized	Rufus	-
6	The Magic of the Blue	Blue Magic	-
9	Dark Horse	George Harrison	-
14	So What	Joe Walsh	-
26	A1A	Jimmy Buffett	-
-	All the Girls in the World Beware!!!	Grand Funk Railroad	-
-	Breakaway	Kris Kristofferson & Rita Coolidge	-
-	House of Exile	Jimmy Cliff	-
-	New and Improved	The Spinners	-
-	Red Queen to Gryphon Three	Gryphon	-
-	Sun Secrets	The Eric Burdon Band	-
-	The Civil Surface	Egg	
-	Satch and Josh	Count Basie, Oscar Peterson	

=== Release date unknown ===
- Alvorecer – Clara Nunes
- Andy Kim – Andy Kim
- Baker Gurvitz Army – Baker Gurvitz Army
- Banquet – Lucifer's Friend
- Blackdance – Klaus Schulze
- Cassidy Live! – David Cassidy
- Caught Up – Millie Jackson
- Child of the Novelty – Mahogany Rush
- Come a Little Closer – Etta James
- Contrappunti – Le Orme
- Dandruff – Ivor Cutler
- Dialogue of the Drums – Andrew Cyrille and Milford Graves
- Elis & Tom – Elis Regina & Tom Jobim
- Ella in London – Ella Fitzgerald
- Five-A-Side – Ace
- Floating World – Jade Warrior
- Hijack – Amon Düül II
- Having Fun with Elvis on Stage – Elvis Presley
- I Can't Stand the Rain – Ann Peebles
- It Is Finished - Nina Simone
- Illusions on a Double Dimple – Triumvirat
- Introducing Eddy and the Falcons – Wizzard
- Invisible – Invisible
- Isis - Isis
- I Wanna Get Funky – Albert King
- Journey – Colin Blunstone
- The Link Wray Rumble – Link Wray
- Live! – April Wine
- Live – The Dubliners
- The Main Event – Live – Frank Sinatra
- Manifiesto – Víctor Jara
- Manuel – Dalida
- Mo' Roots - Taj Mahal
- Olympia 74 – Dalida
- Orleans II – Orleans
- Petra – Petra
- Pick a Dub – Keith Hudson
- Rocking Time - Burning Spear
- Rub It In – Billy "Crash" Craddock
- Something to Say – Buster Brown
- A Tábua de Esmeralda – Jorge Ben
- Tasty – Good Rats
- Teasin' – Cornell Dupree
- They Say I'm Different – Betty Davis
- The Way We Were – Andy Williams
- Touchy – Luie Luie
- Trace – Trace
- What the....You Mean I Can't Sing?! – Melvin van Peebles
- The Whole Thing Started with Rock & Roll Now It's Out of Control – Ray Manzarek
- Wally – Wally
- Way Down Yonder - Charlie Daniels
- Zarthus – Robbie Basho
- Zuckerzeit – Cluster

== Biggest hit singles ==
The following songs achieved the highest chart positions in the charts of 1974.

#	Artist	Title	Year	Country	Chart entries
1	Carl Douglas	Kung Fu Fighting	1974	(Jamaica)	UK 1 – Aug 1974, US BB 1 – Nov 1974, Canada 1 – Nov 1974, Netherlands 1 – Oct 1974, France 1 – Sep 1974, Austria 1 – Dec 1974, Germany 1 – Jan 1975, Ireland 1 – Oct 1974, Australia 1 for 3 weeks Jul 1975, Switzerland 2 – Nov 1974, South Africa 2 of 1974, Norway 3 – Oct 1974, US BB 5 of 1974, Global 7 (10 M sold) – 1974, Sweden 8 – Aug 1998, POP 9 of 1974, Italy 10 of 1975, US CashBox 11 of 1975, Scrobulate 12 of disco, Australia 22 of 1974, Germany 27 of the 1970s, RYM 84 of 1974, OzNet 842
2	Mud	Tiger Feet	1974	(United Kingdom)	UK 1 – Jan 1974
3	ABBA	Waterloo	1974	(Sweden)	UK 1 – Apr 1974, Switzerland 1 – Apr 1974, Norway 1 – Apr 1974, Germany 1 – May 1974, Ireland 1 – Apr 1974, Netherlands 2 – Apr 1974, Austria 2 – May 1974, Canada 3 – Jun 1974, France 5 – Apr 1974, US BB 6 – Jun 1974, Scrobulate 6 of Swedish, Australia Goset 10 – Jul 1974, South Africa 14 of 1974, POP 23 of 1974, Global 33 (5 M sold) – 1974, RYM 33 of 1974, Germany 49 of the 1970s, Italy 51 of 1974, Europe 55 of the 1970s, US CashBox 84 of 1974, OzNet 413, Acclaimed 1016
4	Steve Miller Band	The Joker	1974	(United States)	UK 1 – Aug 1990, US BB 1 – Nov 1973, Netherlands 1 – Oct 1973, Ireland 1 – Sep 1990, Canada 2 – Dec 1973, Norway 2 – Nov 1990, Switzerland 5 – Oct 1990, Austria 6 – Oct 1990, Germany 7 – Jan 1991, Australia Goset 7 – Feb 1974, France 8 – Dec 1973, US CashBox 10 of 1974, Poland 11 – Sep 1990, DDD 13 of 1973, US BB 21 of 1974, POP 33 of 1974, RYM 61 of 1973, Scrobulate 62 of 70s, Virgin 84, TheQ 297, Germany 399 of the 1990s, OzNet 561, Acclaimed 1721
5	George McCrae	Rock Your Baby	1974	(United States)	UK 1 – Jun 1974, US BB 1 – Jun 1974, Netherlands 1 – Aug 1974, Austria 1 – Oct 1974, Switzerland 1 – Aug 1974, Norway 1 – Sep 1974, Germany 1 – Jan 1975, Canada 2 – Jun 1974, France 4 – Aug 1974, Germany 7 of the 1970s, Global 7 (10 M sold) – 1974, Italy 11 of 1974, Australia 20 of 1974, Australia Goset 37 – Aug 1974, RYM 39 of 1974, US CashBox 40 of 1974, Acclaimed 807

== Top 40 Chart hit singles ==
Song title	Artist(s)	Release date(s)	US	UK	Highest chart position	Other Chart Performance(s)
"Ain't Too Proud to Beg"	The Rolling Stones	October 1970	17	n/a	11 (France)	14 (Canada) - 15 (US Cash Box Charts) - 23 (US Record World magazine)
"The Air That I Breathe"	The Hollies	January 1974	6	2	1 (Netherlands, New Zealand, South Africa)	See chart performance entry
"Already Gone"	Eagles	April 1974	32	n/a	12 (Canada)	n/a
"Always Yours"	Gary Glitter	June 1974	n/a	1	1 (Ireland, United Kingdom)	11 (Australia) - 14 (Germany) - 25 (Netherlands [Dutch Top 40])
"Amateur Hour"	Sparks	July 1974	n/a	7	7 (United Kingdom)	12 (Germany) - 19 (Ireland)
"Annie's Song"	John Denver	June 1974	1	1	1 (Canada, Ireland, United Kingdom, United States)	See chart performance entry
"Another Saturday Night"	Cat Stevens	July 1974	6	19	1 (Canada)	See chart performance entry

=== Other Chart hit singles ===
- "99 Miles from L.A." - Albert Hammond
- "All Of My Life" – Diana Ross
- "Band on the Run" – Paul McCartney & Wings
- "The Bangin' Man" – Slade
- "Beach Baby" – The First Class
- "Best of My Love" – Eagles
- "Beyond the Blue Horizon" – Lou Christie
- "Billy Don't Be a Hero" – Paper Lace
- "Billy Don't Be a Hero" – Bo Donaldson and The Heywoods
- "The Bitch Is Back" – Elton John
- "Black Water" – The Doobie Brothers
- "Boogie Down" – Eddie Kendricks
- "Born with a Smile on My Face" – Stephanie de Sykes and Simon May
- "Break the Rules" – Status Quo
- "The Bump" – Commodores
- "The Bump" – Kenny
- "Bungle in the Jungle" – Jethro Tull
- "Can't Get Enough" – Bad Company
- "Can't Get Enough of Your Love, Babe" – Barry White
- "Can't Get It Out of My Head" – Electric Light Orchestra
- "Carefree Highway" – Gordon Lightfoot
- "Central Park Arrest" – Thunderthighs
- "Clap for the Wolfman" – The Guess Who
- "Come and Get Your Love" – Redbone
- "Dark Horse" – George Harrison
- "Dark Lady" – Cher
- "Devil Gate Drive" – Suzi Quatro
- "Diamond Dogs" – David Bowie
- "Do It ('Til You're Satisfied)" – B. T. Express
- "Do It Baby" – The Miracles
- "Doctor's Orders" – Carol Douglas
- "Doctor's Orders" – Sunny
- "Don't Let the Sun Go Down on Me" – Elton John
- "Don't Stay Away Too Long – Peters and Lee
- "Don't You Worry 'bout a Thing" – Stevie Wonder
- "Down Down" – Status Quo
- "Dreamer" – Supertramp
- "Emma" – Hot Chocolate
- "The Entertainer" – Marvin Hamlisch
- "Enter the Dragon (OST Song)" – Lalo Schifrin
- "Canta y sé feliz" – Peret
- "Everyday" – Slade
- "Everlasting Love" – Carl Carlton
- "Everything I Own" – Ken Boothe
- "Eviva España" – Sylvia
- "Far Far Away" – Slade
- "For the Love of Money" – The O'Jays
- "Funky President" – James Brown
- "Get Dancin'" – Disco-Tex and the Sex-O-Lettes
- "Go (Before You Break My Heart)" [English version of "Sì"] – Gigliola Cinquetti
- "Gonna Make You a Star" – David Essex
- "Hang On in There Baby" – Johnny Bristol
- "Hasta Mañana" – ABBA
- "Haven't Got Time for the Pain" – Carly Simon
- "He's Misstra Know-It-All" – Stevie Wonder
- "Help Me" – Joni Mitchell
- "He Thinks I Still Care" – Anne Murray
- "Hollywood Swinging" – Kool & the Gang
- "Homely Girl" – The Chi-Lites
- "Honey, Honey" – ABBA
- "Honey, Honey" – Sweet Dreams
- "Honey Bee"- Gloria Gaynor
- "Hooked on a Feeling" – Blue Swede
- "Hot Shot" – Barry Blue
- "How Come" – Ronnie Lane & Slim Chance
- "How Long" – Ace
- "I Can Help" – Billy Swan
- "I Can't Stop" – The Osmonds
- "I Honestly Love You" – Olivia Newton-John
- "I Know What I Like (In Your Wardrobe)" – Genesis
- "I See a Star" – Mouth & MacNeal
- "I Shot the Sheriff" – Eric Clapton
- "I'll Have to Say I Love You in a Song" – Jim Croce
- "I'm a Train" – Albert Hammond
- "I'm in Love" – Aretha Franklin
- "I'm Leaving It All Up to You – Donny and Marie Osmond
- "It's Only Rock 'n' Roll (But I Like It)" – The Rolling Stones
- "I've Got to Use My Imagination" – Gladys Knight & the Pips
- "Jambalaya (On the Bayou)" – The Carpenters
- "Jazzman" – Carole King
- "Jealous Mind" – Alvin Stardust
- "Jet" – Paul McCartney & Wings
- "Jolene"- Dolly Parton
- "Judy Teen" – Cockney Rebel
- "Jungle Boogie" – Kool & the Gang
- "Junior's Farm" – Paul McCartney & Wings
- "Killer Queen" – Queen
- "Kissin' in the Back Row of the Movies" – The Drifters
- "Let Me Be There" – Olivia Newton-John
- "Let's Put It All Together" – The Stylistics
- "Life Is a Rock (But the Radio Rolled Me)" – Reunion
- "Light of Love" – T. Rex
- "The Loco-Motion" – Grand Funk Railroad
- "Lonely People" – America
- "Lonely This Christmas" – Mud
- "The Love I Lost" – Harold Melvin & the Blue Notes
- "Love Me for a Reason" – The Osmonds
- "Love's Theme" – The Love Unlimited Orchestra
- "Ma-Ma-Ma Belle" – Electric Light Orchestra
- "Machine Gun" – Commodores
- "Magic" – Pilot
- "Mandy" – Barry Manilow
- "The Man Who Sold the World" – Lulu
- "Me and Baby Brother" – War
- "Midnight at the Oasis" – Maria Muldaur
- "Miss Hit and Run" – Barry Blue
- "Mockingbird" – Carly Simon (with James Taylor)
- "Money" – Pink Floyd
- "Ms Grace" – The Tymes
- "My Melody of Love" – Bobby Vinton
- "Never, Never Gonna Give Ya Up" – Barry White
- "No Honestly" – Lynsey de Paul
- "The Night Chicago Died" – Paper Lace
- "Oh My My" – Ringo Starr
- "On and On" – Gladys Knight & the Pips
- "One Man Band" – Leo Sayer
- "Ooh I Do" – Lynsey de Paul
- "Overnight Sensation (Hit Record)" – Raspberries
- "The Payback" – James Brown
- "The Pill"- Loretta Lynn
- "Please Come to Boston" – Dave Loggins
- "Queen of Clubs" – KC and the Sunshine Band
- "Radar Love" – Golden Earring
- "Rebel Rebel" – David Bowie
- "Remember Me This Way" – Gary Glitter
- "Remember You're A Womble" – The Wombles
- "Rikki Don't Lose That Number" – Steely Dan
- "Rock 'n' Roll Winter" – Wizzard
- "Rock Me Gently" – Andy Kim
- "Rock On" – David Essex
- "Rock the Boat" – The Hues Corporation
- "Rockin' Soul" – The Hues Corporation
- "Rockin' Roll Baby" – The Stylistics
- "Sad Sweet Dreamer" – Sweet Sensation
- "School Love" – Barry Blue
- "Seasons in the Sun" – Terry Jacks
- "Sebastian" – Cockney Rebel
- "Shang-A-Lang" – Bay City Rollers
- "She" – Charles Aznavour
- "Shinin' on" – Grand Funk Railroad
- "The Show Must Go On" – Three Dog Night
- "Sideshow" – Blue Magic
- "Smokin' in the Boys Room" – Brownsville Station
- "Stop and Smell the Roses" – Mac Davis
- "The Streak" – Ray Stevens
- "Streets of London" – Ralph McTell
- "Sugar Baby Love" – The Rubettes
- "Summer Breeze" – The Isley Brothers
- "Sundown" – Gordon Lightfoot
- "Sweet Home Alabama" – Lynyrd Skynyrd
- "TSOP (The Sound of Philadelphia)" – MFSB (with vocals by The Three Degrees)
- "Tell Me a Lie" – Sami Jo
- "Tell Me Something Good" – Rufus & Chaka Khan
- "There's a Ghost in My House" – R. Dean Taylor
- "This Heart" – Gene Redding
- "This Town Ain't Big Enough for Both of Us" – Sparks
- "Tin Man" – America
- "Touch Too Much" – Arrows
- "Trying to Hold on to My Woman" – Lamont Dozier
- "Until You Come Back to Me (That's What I'm Gonna Do)" – Aretha Franklin
- "The Way We Were" – Barbra Streisand
- "The Wall Street Shuffle" – 10cc
- "Whatever Gets You thru the Night" – John Lennon with the Plastic Ono Nuclear Band
- "When Will I See You Again" – The Three Degrees
- "Wild One" – Suzi Quatro
- "You Ain't Seen Nothing Yet" – Bachman–Turner Overdrive
- "You Are Everything" – Diana Ross and Marvin Gaye
- "You Haven't Done Nothin'" – Stevie Wonder
- "You Make Me Feel Brand New" – The Stylistics
- "You Won't See Me" – Anne Murray
- "(You're) Having My Baby" – Paul Anka & Odia Coates
- "You're Sixteen" – Ringo Starr
- "You're the Best Thing That Ever Happened to Me" – Gladys Knight & the Pips
- "You're the First, the Last, My Everything" – Barry White

== Notable singles ==
Song title	Artist(s)	Release date(s)	Other Chart Performance(s)
"Can I Sit Next to You, Girl"	AC/DC	July 1974	50 (Australia)
"Hey Joe" / "Piss Factory"	Patti Smith	November 1974	n/a
"September Gurls"	Big Star	May 1974	n/a

=== Other Notable singles ===
- "Ake, Make, Pera ja mä" b/w "Perjantai on mielessäin" - Hector

== Published popular music ==
- "Annie's Song" – w.m. John Denver
- "Cat's in the Cradle" – Harry Chapin
- "Happy Days" – w.m. Pratt & McClain from the ABC-TV Series Happy Days
- "Hasta Mañana" – w.m. Benny Andersson, Stig Anderson & Björn Ulvaeus
- "I Honestly Love You" – w.m. Peter Allen & Jeff Barry
- "I Won't Send Roses" – w.m. Jerry Herman introduced by Robert Preston and reprised by Bernadette Peters in the musical Mack & Mabel
- "I've Got the Music in Me" – w.m. Bias Boshell
- "Midnight at the Oasis" – w.m. David Nichtern
- "Murder on the Orient Express" – m. Richard Rodney Bennett from the film Murder on the Orient Express
- "Freebird" – Lynyrd Skynyrd
- "No Goodbyes" – w.m. Richard M. Sherman & Robert B. Sherman from the musical Over Here!
- "Pencil Thin Mustache" – w.m. Jimmy Buffett
- "Ring Ring" – w.m. Benny Andersson, Stig Anderson, Björn Ulvaeus, Neil Sedaka & Phil Cody
- "She" – w. Herbert Kretzmer m. Charles Aznavour
- "Southern Nights" – w.m. Allen Toussaint
- "Sundown" – w.m. Gordon Lightfoot
- "Sunshine on My Shoulders" – w.m. John Denver, Richard Kniss & Michael Taylor
- "Tap Your Troubles Away" – w.m. Jerry Herman from the musical Mack & Mabel
- "Time Heals Everything" – w.m. Jerry Herman. Introduced by Bernadette Peters in the musical Mack & Mabel
- "Waterloo" – w.m. Benny Andersson, Stig Anderson & Björn Ulvaeus
- "We May Never Love Like This Again" – w.m. Al Kasha & Joel Hirschorn. From the film The Towering Inferno
- "Whatever Happened to Randolph Scott" – w.m. Don Reid
- "(You're) Having My Baby" – w.m. Paul Anka
- "Gigi L'Amoroso" – Dalida
- "Anima Mia" – Dalida
- "Ta Femme" – Dalida

== Classical music ==
- Anne Boyd – Angklung for piano
- George Crumb – Music for a Summer Evening (Makrokosmos III) for two amplified pianos and percussion (two players).
- Mario Davidovsky
  - Synchronisms No. 7, for orchestra and tape
  - Synchronisms No. 8, for woodwind quintet and tape
- Einar Englund – Piano Concerto No. 2
- Luc Ferrari
  - Petite symphonie intuitive pour une paysage de printemps
  - éphémère I, for tape and undetermined instrumentation
- Nicolas Flagello – The Passion of Martin Luther King (oratorio)
- Joaquin Homs – Trio
- Wojciech Kilar – Krzesany, for orchestra
- György Ligeti – San Francisco Polyphony, for orchestra (1973–74)
- Olivier Messiaen – Des canyons aux étoiles... for solo piano, solo horn, solo glockenspiel, solo xylorimba, small orchestra with 13 string players
- Krzysztof Penderecki – The Dream of Jacob
- Wolfgang Regel – Requiem "à la mémoire de César Geoffray"
- Steve Reich – Music for 18 Musicians
- Wolfgang Rihm
  - Dis-Kontur for orchestra
  - Hervorgedunkelt (text: Paul Celan), for mezzo-soprano, flute, harp, vibraphone, cello, organ, and percussion
  - Klavierstück Nr. 4
  - Siebengestalt, for organ and tam-tam
- Alfred Schnittke
  - Symphony No. 1
  - Hymn I, for cello, harp and timpani
  - Hymn II, for cello and double-bass
  - Hymn III, for cello, bassoon, harpsichord and bells or timpani
- Dmitri Shostakovich – String Quartet No. 15 in E-flat minor, Op. 144
- Karlheinz Stockhausen – Inori: Adorations for One or Two Soloists with Orchestra

== Opera ==
- Robert Ashley – Music with Roots in the Aether
- Friedrich Goldmann – R.Hot bzw. Die Hitze

== Musical theater ==
- Candide (Leonard Bernstein) – Broadway revival
- Cole London production opened at the Mermaid Theatre on July 2. Cast included Julia McKenzie, Bill Kerr, Una Stubbs and Rod McLennan
- Gypsy (Jule Styne and Stephen Sondheim) – Broadway revival
- Hans Christian Andersen – London production
- Lorelei – Broadway production opened at the Palace Theatre and ran for 321 performances
- Mack and Mabel – Broadway production opened at the Majestic Theatre and ran for 66 performances
- The Magic Show – Off-Broadway production
- Over Here! – Broadway production opened at the Schubert Theatre and ran for 341 performances
- West Side Story (Bernstein) – London revival

== Musical films ==
- Huckleberry Finn
- Mame
- Phantom of the Paradise
- That's Entertainment!
- Son of Dracula

== Births ==
- January 1 – Mehdi Ben Slimane, Tunisian footballer
- January 4 – Tricky Stewart, American record producer, musician and songwriter
- January 6 – Wolfgang Dimetrik, Austrian accordionist
- January 10 – Jemaine Clement, New Zealand bassist, guitarist, pianist and singer (Flight of the Conchords)
- January 10 – Hrithik Roshan, Indian actor
- January 11
  - Giuseppe Filianoti, Italian opera singer (tenor)
  - Jan Wayne, German DJ music producer
- January 12 – Melanie C, English pop singer (Spice Girls)
- January 18 – Gustavo Kupinski, Argentine guitarist (d. 2011)
- January 18 – Christian Burns, English singer (BBMak)
- January 21 – Linda Thelenius, Swedish glamour model and singer (Basic Element)
- January 22 – Barbara Dex, Belgian singer
- January 23 – Chris Corner, English singer, songwriter and record producer (Sneaker Pimps)
- January 25 – Emily Haines, Canadian singer-songwriter
- January 26 – Rokia Traoré, Malian singer-songwriter
- January 29 – Mălina Olinescu, Romanian singer (d. 2011)
- February 7 – Danny Goffey, English musician and singer-songwriter (Supergrass)
- February 7
  - J Dilla, American record producer, rapper, and songwriter (Slum Village) (d. 2006)
  - Jeff Schroeder, American guitarist (The Smashing Pumpkins)
- February 8
  - Guy-Manuel de Homem-Christo, French record producer, singer-songwriter, DJ and composer (Daft Punk)
  - Seth Green, American actor
- February 11 – D'Angelo, American R&B and neo soul singer-songwriter, multi-instrumentalist and record producer (d. 2025)
- February 13 – Robbie Williams, British singer-songwriter
- February 15
  - Renee Sands, American R&B singer (Wild Orchid)
  - Mr Lordi, Finnish rock singer (Lordi)
  - Miranda July, American actress
- February 17
  - Bernt Moen, Norwegian pianist
  - Bryan White, American singer-songwriter and guitarist
- February 22 – James Blunt, English singer, songwriter and musician
- February 24
  - Chad Hugo, American multi-instrumentalist and record producer. (The Neptunes, N.E.R.D, Pharrell Williams)
  - Noah Bernardo, American musician (P.O.D.)
- March 6 – Guy Garvey, British singer-songwriter and guitarist (Elbow)
- March 6 – Yanou, German trance
- March 9 – Deborah Lurie, American composer, arranger, and music producer
- March 10 – Keren Ann, Dutch-Israeli singer and songwriter
- March 13 – Phil Burton, Australian singer (Human Nature)
- March 18 – Stuart Zender, English bassist (Jamiroquai)
- March 25 – Finley Quaye, Scottish musician and singer
- March 28 – Mystic, American singer and rapper
- April 7 – Antonia Bennett, American singer of adult alternative music, standards, and jazz.
- April 8 – Karima Kibble, American gospel singer (Virtue)
- April 11
  - David Jassy, Swedish musician, songwriter and music producer
  - Alexander Kuoppala, Finnish guitarist
- April 12 – Belinda Emmett, Australian singer, musician and actress (d. 2006)
- April 14 – Da Brat, American rapper and actress
- April 15 – Kim Min-kyo, South Korean actor and director
- April 17
  - Victoria Beckham, English businesswoman, fashion designer, model and singer (Spice Girls)
  - Mikael Åkerfeldt, Swedish musician (Opeth)
- April 18
  - Millie Corretjer, Puerto Rican singer and actress
  - Mark Tremonti, American guitarist and singer (Creed)
- April 20
  - Julie Fernandez, English actress and model
  - Duncan Trussell, American actor and comedian
- April 21 – Faust, Norwegian drummer
- April 22 – Shavo Odadjian, Armenian-American bassist (System of a Down)
- April 23 – Carlos Dengler (Interpol)
- April 26
  - Nerina Pallot, British singer, songwriter and producer
  - Greg Laswell, American musician, recording engineer, and producer (Ingrid Michaelson)
- April 29 – Anggun, Indonesian singer
- April 30 – Andrey Gubin, Russian singer
- May 1 – Kellie Crawford, Australian singer, dancer, actress and children's performer
- May 2 – Matt Berry, an English actor, comedian, musician, and writer
- May 6 – Patrick Tang, Hong Kong actor and singer
- May 9 – The Caretaker, English ambient musician
- May 10
  - Quentin Elias, French-Algerian singer and actor (Alliage) (d. 2014)
  - Shin Jung-hwan, South Korean singer and entertainer (Roo'ra)
- May 16 – Laura Pausini, Italian singer
- May 17 – Andrea Corr, Irish singer (The Corrs)
- May 18 – Chantal Kreviazuk, Canadian singer-songwriter
- May 20 – Mikael Stanne, Swedish musician (Dark Tranquillity)
- May 21
  - Adriano Cintra, Brazilian multi-instrumentalist and producer (Cansei de Ser Sexy)
  - Havoc, American Rapper and record producer (Mobb Deep)
- May 23 – Jewel, American singer-songwriter, poet and musician
- May 23 – Mónica Naranjo, Spanish singer
- May 23 – Richard Jones, Stereophonics
- May 30 – Big L, freestyle rapper
- June 1
  - Alanis Morissette, Canadian singer-songwriter
  - Wade Morissette, Canadian musician (sister of Alanis Morissette)
- June 3
  - Kelly Jones, Welsh singer-songwriter (Stereophonics)
  - Seo Jang-hoon, South Korean basketball player
- June 4 – Lange, English DJ and record producer
- June 7
  - Cassius Khan, Canadian singer and tabla player
  - Max Tundra, English multi-instrumentalist, musician, singer, and music producer
- June 9 – Samoth, Norwegian musician
- June 13 – Selma Björnsdóttir, Icelandic singer
- June 20 – Andrew Tierney, Australian singer (Human Nature)
- June 24
  - Magnus Carlsson, Swedish singer
  - Vinnie Fiorello, American drummer and songwriter (Less Than Jake)
- June 25
  - Karisma Kapoor, Indian actress
  - Mario Calire, American drummer (The Wallflowers)
- June 27 – Wim Soutaer, Belgian singer and songwriter
- June 28 – Rob Dyrdek, American actor and television host
- June 30 – Kelli Ali, English singer (Sneaker Pimps)
- July 1 – Jonathan Roumie, American actor
- July 2 – Rocky Gray, American drummer, guitarist and songwriter (Evanescence, We Are the Fallen, Living Sacrifice and Soul Embraced)
- July 3 – Corey Reynolds, American musical theatre, television, and film actor
- July 7 – E.D.I. Mean, American rapper and producer (Outlawz)
- July 9 – Nikola Šarčević, Swedish singer and bassist (Millencolin)
- July 9 – Ross Antony, German R&B hip hop (Bro'Sis)
- July 10
  - Imelda May, Irish singer
  - Amanda Ghost, English singer
- July 11
  - Alanas Chošnau, Lithuanian singer and songwriter
  - Lil' Kim, American rapper
- July 12 – Sharon den Adel, Dutch singer
- July 13 – Deborah Cox, Canadian R&B singer
- July 16 – Jeremy Enigk, American singer/songwriter (Sunny Day Real Estate, The Fire Theft)
- July 17 – Tim Hecker, Canadian electronic musician, producer, composer and sound artist
- July 19 – Ramin Djawadi, Iranian-German composer
- July 20 – Bonny B., Cambodian blues musician
- July 21 – Terry Coldwell, singer (East 17)
- July 22
  - Rell, soul singer
  - Johnny Strong, American actor and musician
- July 26 – Iron & Wine, American singer and songwriter
- July 28 – Afroman, American rapper, singer and songwriter
- July 30 – Lee Jae-hoon, South Korean singer and television personality (Cool)
- July 31 – Leona Naess, British singer-songwriter (Evan Ross, Diana Ross)
- August 1 – Rampage, American rapper (Flipmode Squad)
- August 2 – Emma, Welsh singer
- August 5
  - Kajol, Indian actress
  - Spike Dawbarn, English boy band (911)
- August 8
  - Preta Gil, Brazilian singer
  - Brian Harvey, British singer (East 17)
- August 13 – Niklas Sundin, Swedish guitarist (Dark Tranquillity)
- August 14 – Ana Matronic, American singer (Scissor Sisters)
- August 16 – Charli Baltimore, American rapper and television personality
- August 17 – Salem Abraha, singer-songwriter
- August 20 – Amy Adams, American actress
- August 23
  - Shifty Shellshock, American musician (Crazy Town) (d. 2024)
  - Pacewon, American rapper and producer (Outsidaz)
- August 24 – Achim Petry, German singer and musician (Trademark)
- August 29 – Mario Winans, American R&B singer, songwriter and record producer
- August 30
  - Aaron Barrett, lead singer and guitarist (Reel Big Fish)
  - Rich Cronin, American singer, songwriter, and rapper (LFO) (d. 2010)
- September 4 – Carmit Bachar, American singer, dancer, model, actress and showgirl (Pussycat Dolls)
- September 6 – Nina Persson, Swedish singer-songwriter (The Cardigans)
- September 9 – Marcos Curiel, American musician, record producer and songwriter (P.O.D.)
- September 16 – Loona, Dutch pop singer and dancer
- September 17
  - DJ Babu, American DJ and record producer
  - Bianca Shomburg, German singer
- September 18 – Xzibit, American rapper and actor
- September 19 – Jimmy Fallon, American comedian & musician
- September 21 – Crystal Aikin, American gospel singer-songwriter
- September 23 – Layzie Bone, American rapper (Bone Thugs-n-Harmony)
- September 24
  - Niels Brinck, Danish singer and songwriter
  - Kati Wolf, Hungarian singer
- September 25
  - Slim, American R&B singer (112)
  - Daniel Kessler, English-American guitarist (Interpol)
- September 26 – Joo Jin-mo, South Korean actor
- September 29 – Liam Howe, English record producer, musician and songwriter (Sneaker Pimps)
- September 30 – Sheek Louch, American rapper and songwriter
- September – Flashrider, Polish DJ and music producer
- October 1 – Keith Duffy, Irish pop singer and actor
- October 4 – Ramazan Kubat, Turkish folk singer and composer
- October 5 – Heather Headley, Trinidadian-American singer, songwriter, record producer and actress
- October 7
  - Charlotte Nilsson, Swedish singer
  - Allison Munn, American actress
- October 12 – Ebru Gündeş, Turkish singer, actress, and television personality
- October 14
  - Natalie Maines, American singer-songwriter
  - Shaggy 2 Dope, American rapper and producer
  - Lam Trường, Vietnamese singer
- October 17 – Kia Shine, American rapper, songwriter, and record producer
- October 18 – Peter Svensson, Swedish guitarist (The Cardigans)
- October 19 – Peter Evrard, Belgian singer
- October 28 – Dayanara Torres, Puerto Rican actress, singer, dancer, model and beauty queen
- October 28 - Karen Damen, Belgian singer (K3)
- October 31 – Natasja Saad, Danish rapper and reggae singer (d. 2007)
- November 1 – Kim Kärnfalk, Swedish singer (Friends)
- November 2
  - Nelly, American rapper
  - Prodigy, American rapper and record producer (Mobb Deep) (d. 2017)
- November 3 – Franko Božac, Croatian accordionist
- November 4 – Louise Nurding, English singer, television personality and member of Eternal
- November 5 – Ryan Adams, American musician
- November 9 – Alessandro Del Piero, Italian footballer
- November 11 – Leonardo DiCaprio, American actor
- November 14 – Chad Kroeger, Canadian singer-songwriter and musician
- November 19 – G. Dep, American rapper
- November 26 - Katrina Lenk, American actress, singer, dancer, musician, and songwriter.
- November 28 – apl.de.ap, Filipino-American musician (Black Eyed Peas)
- November 28 – Daz Sampson, English singer-songwriter, record producer and football manager (Bus Stop)
- November 28 – Styles P, American rapper
- December 3
  - Trina, American rapper and musician
  - Trina Braxton, American singer and television personality (The Braxtons)
- December 7
  - Nicole Appleton, Canadian television presenter, singer-songwriter and actress (All Saints)
  - Kang Full, South Korean webtoon artist and screenwriter
- December 8 – Cristian Castro, Mexican singer
- December 8 – Nick Zinner, American guitarist (Yeah Yeah Yeahs)
- December 9
  - Canibus, American rapper and actor
  - Emjay, Canadian singer-songwriter
- December 10 – Meg White, American drummer and singer (The White Stripes)
- December 10 – Nina Gerhard, German singer (Captain Hollywood Project)
- December 11 – Ben Shephard, English television presenter and journalist
- December 12 – Michelle Saram, Singaporean actress, singer and businesswoman
- December 13 – Sara Cox, English broadcaster and author
- December 13 – Nick McCarthy, English-German guitarist and singer (Franz Ferdinand, Box Codax, FFS, Embryo, Scatter)
- December 14 – Nate Smith, American drummer, songwriter and producer
- December 15 – Acey Slade, American Musician
- December 18
  - Rah Digga, American rapper and actress
  - Cuban Link, Cuban-American rapper (Terror Squad)
- December 24
  - Julian Rachlin, Lithuanian-Austrian violinist
  - Ryan Seacrest, American musical/entertainment television host, radio personality and producer
- December 28 – Jocelyn Enriquez, American singer and songwriter

== Deaths ==
- January 2 – Tex Ritter, American country music singer, 68
- January 23 – Lena Machado, Hawaiian singer, 70
- January 30 – Olav Roots, Estonian pianist and composer, 63
- February 2 – Jean Absil, organist and composer, 80
- February 15 – Kurt Atterberg, Swedish composer, 86
- February 28 – Bobby Bloom, singer-songwriter, 28
- March 7 – Alberto Rabagliati, Italian singer and actor, 67
- March 28
  - Dorothy Fields, lyricist, 68
  - Dino Ciani, pianist, 32 (road accident)
  - Arthur Crudup, singer, 68
- April 5 – Jennifer Vyvyan, operatic soprano, 49 (bronchial condition)
- April 7 – Pete Wendling, pianist and composer, 85
- April 15 – Giovanni D'Anzi, Italian songwriter, 68
- April 17 – Blossom Seeley, US singer and vaudeville entertainer, 87
- April 25 – Pamela Courson, Jim Morrison's widow, 27 (heroin overdose)
- May 8 – Graham Bond, R&B musician, 36 (hit by train)
- May 14 – Franca Somigli, American soprano, 73
- May 15 – Paul Gonsalves, jazz saxophonist, 53
- May 24 – Duke Ellington, jazz musician, and composer, 75
- June 8 – Rodolfo Lipizer, violinist and conductor, 79
- June 22 – Darius Milhaud, composer, 81
- June 27 – Cliff Friend, US composer
- July 18 – Gabrielle Ritter-Ciampi, operatic soprano, 77
- July 27 – Lightnin' Slim, blues musician, 61
- July 29 – "Mama" Cass Elliott, singer (The Mamas & the Papas), 32 (heart attack)
- August 6 – Gene Ammons, tenor saxophonist, 49 (cancer)
- August 9 – Bill Chase, jazz rock trumpeter, 39
- August 11 – Maria Maksakova, Sr., opera singer, 72
- September 3 – Harry Partch, composer, 73
- September 22 – Marta Fuchs, operatic soprano, 76
- September 23 – Robbie McIntosh, drummer (Average White Band), 24
- October 5 – Ebe Stignani, operatic soprano, about 70
- October 13 – Josef Krips, violinist, 72
- October 24 – David Oistrakh, violinist, 66
- November 5 – Marguerite Namara, operatic soprano, 85
- November 8 – Ivory Joe Hunter, R&B singer, songwriter and pianist
- November 9 – Egon Wellesz, Austrian composer, musicologist and teacher (emigrated to England), 89
- November 11 – Alfonso Leng, composer, 80
- November 19 – George Brunies, jazz musician, 72
- November 21 – Frank Martin, composer, 84
- November 25 – Nick Drake, singer/songwriter, 26 (overdose)

== Awards ==
=== Grammy Awards ===
- Grammy Awards of 1974

=== Eurovision Song Contest ===
- Eurovision Song Contest 1974
