= The Magic of the Blue =

Studio album by Blue Magic
- Released: December 1974
- Recorded: 1974
- Studios: Sigma Sound, Philadelphia, Pennsylvania
- Genre: Philadelphia soul
- Length: 43:17
- Label: Atco
- Producers: Norman Harris, Bobby Eli

Blue Magic chronology
Blue Magic (1974)	The Magic of the Blue (1974)	Thirteen Blue Magic Lane (1975)

Professional ratings
Review scores
Source	Rating
AllMusic	4/5 stars
Christgau's Record Guide	C+

The Magic of the Blue is the second album by American soul group Blue Magic, produced by Norman Harris and Bobby Eli and released in 1974 on the Atco label.

== History ==
The album was recorded at Sigma Sound Studios in Philadelphia and features Sigma's famous house band MFSB. The Magic of the Blue received a similar favorable critical reception to its predecessor Blue Magic, although its lead single "Three Ring Circus" was regarded as an obvious attempt to produce "Sideshow" Part 2. The album peaked at #14 on the R&B chart and #71 on the pop chart. It was reissued by Rhino Records in 2006, but unlike the same company's Blue Magic reissue, did not include any bonus tracks.

== Track listing ==
Side one
No.	Title	Writer(s)	Length
1.	"Three Ring Circus"	Bobby Eli, Vinnie Barrett	5:12
2.	"Stringin' Me Along"	Norman Harris, Pat Cooper, Ronnie Tyson	3:29
3.	"You Don't Have to Tell Me Goodbye"	Norman Harris, Vinnie Barrett, James Hendricks	4:26
4.	"Never Get Over You"	Norman Harris, Allan Felder	4:42
5.	"Talking to Myself"	Bobby Eli, Vinnie Barrett	4:22

Side two
No.	Title	Writer(s)	Length
6.	"Let Me Be the One"	Norman Harris, Allan Felder, Chuck Brooks	5:05
7.	"Maybe Just Maybe (We Can Fall in Love Again)"	Morris Bailey, Jr., Edward Green	4:15
8.	"Love Has Found Its Way to Me"	Bobby Eli, Allan Waldman	5:02
9.	"When Ya Coming Home"	Ted Mills, Allan Felder	3:48
10.	"Looking for a Friend"	Ted Mills	4:12

== Personnel ==
Blue Magic

- Vernon Sawyer, Richard Pratt, Keith Beaton, Wendell Sawyer, Ted Mills

Musicians

- Tony Bell, Roland Chambers, Bobby Eli, Norman Harris – guitar
- Cotton Kent, Ron Kersey, Ted Mills – piano
- Bob Babbitt, Ron Baker, Rusty Jackmon – bass guitar
- Charles Collins, John Nero, Earl Young – drums
- Larry Washington – congas
- Vincent Montana Jr. – vibraphone
- T. Life – harmonica solo on "Three Ring Circus"
- Don Renaldo and his Strings and Horns – strings & horns accompaniment
- Ted Mills – sound effects on "Looking for a Friend"

== Production ==
- Norman Harris, Bobby Eli – producers, arrangement
- Alan Rubens, Steven Bernstein, Bruce Gable – executive producers
- Carl Paruolo, Joe Tarsia, Kenny Present, Don Murray, Jay Mark – recording engineers
- Ron Kersey, Vince Montana, Jack Faith, – arrangement
- Carl Helm, Phil Hurtt, Bunny Sigler, Barbara Ingram, Evette Benton, Carla Benson, Ted Mills, Wendall Sawyer, Darryl Grant – vocal arrangement

== Charts ==
Chart (1974)	Peak
U.S. Billboard Top LPs	71
U.S. Billboard Top Soul LPs	14

Singles

Year	Single	Peak chart positions			
Year	Single	US	US R&B	US A/C	CAN
1974	"Three Ring Circus"	36	5	26	87
1975	"Love Has Found Its Way to Me"	—	45	—	—
