= Vincent Montana Jr. =

American musician (1928–2013)

Vince Montana
- Born: Vincent Montana Jr. February 12, 1928; Philadelphia, Pennsylvania, United States
- Died: April 13, 2013 (aged 85) Cherry Hill, New Jersey, United States
- Genres: Jazz, soul, disco
- Occupations: Percussionist, vibraphonist, arranger, bandleader, composer
- Years active: c.1950–2000s
- Labels: Salsoul, Atlantic, Philly Sound Works

Vincent Montana Jr. (February 12, 1928 – April 13, 2013), known as Vince Montana, was an American composer, arranger, vibraphonist, and percussionist. He is best known as a member of MFSB and as the founder of the Salsoul Orchestra. He has been called "the Godfather of disco". Montana was inducted into the Musicians Hall of Fame and Museum in 2016.

== Life and career ==
Montana was born in South Philadelphia, Pennsylvania, and grew up in an Italian-American neighborhood. He began playing drums as a child and soon took up other percussion instruments, including the glockenspiel and marimba. By the late 1940s, he regularly played in nightclubs with jazz musicians such as Charlie Parker, Sarah Vaughan, Clifford Brown and Red Garland. He then spent time as a musician in Las Vegas hotels, accompanying and arranging for Harry Belafonte, Louis Prima and others. He returned to Philadelphia in the late 1950s, playing vibraphone on Frankie Avalon's 1959 hit "Venus", as well as recordings by Chubby Checker, Bobby Rydell and others. Around the same time, he started to be featured regularly on the nationally syndicated TV talk show, The Mike Douglas Show.

He helped to set up Sigma Sound Studios, owned by Joe Tarsia in Philadelphia in 1967 and began working there with record producers Kenny Gamble, Leon Huff and Thom Bell. He was a founding member of MFSB and recorded several albums with the orchestra, including the international hit track, "TSOP (The Sound of Philadelphia)", a Grammy Award winner released in 1973. He played on and arranged many tracks by The Intruders, The Delfonics, The Spinners, Harold Melvin and the Blue Notes, The O'Jays, The Trammps, Eddie Kendricks, William DeVaughn, Billy Paul, Lou Rawls, The Stylistics, Teddy Pendergrass, and many others.

However, he fell out with Gamble and Huff over financial issues and in 1974, after being introduced by Joe Bataan, joined with the Cayre brothers, Kenneth, Stanley, and Joseph - owners of Caytronics, a New York-based distributor of Latin music - to set up the Salsoul label. Several of the Philadelphia musicians, including Norman Harris, Ronnie Baker and Earl Young, left MFSB to join him for sessions and production work. Montana established The Salsoul Orchestra and their first record for the label, "Salsoul Hustle" was a commercial success. The orchestra recorded six albums for the label over the next three years, including a 'gold' Christmas album, with Montana producing, arranging and conducting most tracks. Ken Cayre praised Montana's skill at scoring strings, brass and diverse percussion in such a way that it all worked within a dance recording. The Salsoul Orchestra has been credited as "the first disco orchestra". Montana also worked at Salsoul with other musicians and singers, including First Choice and Loleatta Holloway. His most notable solos include "Runaway" by The Salsoul Orchestra featuring Loleatta Holloway, "Be Thankful for What You Got" by William DeVaughn and "I'm In Heaven" by Touch of Class.

Montana left Salsoul in 1978 to join Atlantic Records for several albums before launching his own Philly Sound Works label. His recording of "Heavy Vibes", a reworking of part of MFSB's "Love Is the Message" credited to the Montana Sextet, reached #59 on the UK singles chart in 1983. In later years, Montana worked with house music duo Masters at Work, which rekindled interest in his work. Most recently, Montana worked on "New York City Boy" by the Pet Shop Boys.

He died in Cherry Hill, New Jersey, on April 13, 2013, at the age of 85.

== Discography ==
KEY: PL = Played on recording as Vibraharpist or Percussionist, Tympani, Marimba, Orchestra Bells and Chimes AC = Arranged musical composition and conducted recording session P = Produced recording session and booked all musicians. WC = As Writer and Publisher of the composition recorded.

- PL Frankie Avalon Solid Gold Single "Venus" (Single) 1959
- PL Soul Survivors "Expressway To Your Heart" (Single) 1967
- PL Cliff Nobles hit Instrumental "The Horse" (Single) 1968
- PL Eddie Holman "Hey There Lonely Girl" (Single) 1969
- PL Delfonics (LP) I'm Sorry, "La La Means I Love You" (Single) 1969
- PL The Intruders "Save The Children" including the hit song
- "I’ll Always Love My Mama"
- "When We Get Married"(LP)
- "Cowboys to Girls", their first album, "The Energy of Love"(LP)
- "The Intruders Greatest Hits", including "Together and United" 1969-1972
- PL Jerry Butler Five LP's - "You and Me" "The Ice Man Cometh"
- "Soul Goes On" "The Spice of Life" "Ice on Ice" 1969-1972
- PL The O’Jays "The O’Jays in Philadelphia" (LP) including
- "One Night Affair" "Backstabber"(LP)including: "Love Train"
- "992 Arguments", and the title cut, "Backstabbers"
- "Family Reunion"(LP) including "I Love Music" 1969-1975
- PL Wilson Pickett "Wilson Pickett In Philadelphia"(LP) 1970
- PL Dusty Springfield "A Brand New Me" (LP) 1970
- PL The Assembled Multitude (LP) "Overture For Tommy" 1970
- PL The Philly Ambassadors "The Ambassadors" (LP) 1970
- PL/AC The Electric Indians "The Electric Indians" (LP) "Keem-o-Sabe"
- WC was Vincent's first gold single 1970
- PL/AC Cissie Houston (Whitney Mother) Cissy Houston on Janice Records 1971
- PL The Family "Family Affair" (LP)
- PL The Stylistics (LP) "You are Everything", " Betcha By Golly Wow"
- "Stop, Look, Listen To Your Heart", "People Make The World Go Round" 1971
- PL The Stylistics "Round 2" (LP) "I’m Stone in Love With You"
- "Break Up To Make Up" 1972
- PL Joe Simon "Drowning in the Sea of Love: (LP) 1972
- PL Ronny Dyson "One Man Band" (LP) 1972
- PL Dick Jenson "Dick Jenson" (LP) 1973
- PL/AC The True Reflections "Where I’m Coming From", "Helpless Man"
- "Look at all the Lonely People" 1973
- PL Johnny Mathis "I’m Coming Home" (LP) including such hits as "Foolish" "Stone In Love With You" "Stop Look and Listen to Your Heart" 1973
- PL Billy Paul, "Ebony Woman" (LP) "Going East(LP) "The 360 Degrees of Billy Paul" (LP) including the Gold single, "Me and Mrs. Jones"
- "Feeling Good at the Cadillac Club"(LP) 1972-73
- PL Harold Melvin and the Blue Notes "I Miss You" (LP) "If You Don’t Know Me By Now" and "I Miss You"
- All Things Happen in Time (LP)
- PL Harold Melvin and The Blue Notes, "Black and Blue"
- AC "Is There A Place For Me" "Caberet" "The Love I Lost" 1973
- PL The Spinners, "The Spinners"(LP) including the One Million Sellers "Could It Be I’m Falling in Love" and "I’ll Be Around" 1973
- PL/AC The First Choice (LP) "Armed and Extremely Dangerous" and 1974 The Player LP) "Guilty", "Guilty Instrumental"(Single)
- PL/AC The Whispers "Bingo" (LP) "The True Reflection"(LP) 1973/74
- PL/AC The Ebonys "The Ebonys"(LP) 1973
- PL/AC The Jacksons 5 Third Album (LP) 1973
- PL/AC Brenda and The Tabulations "Brenda and The Tabulations"(LP) 1973
- PL Patty La Belle "La Belle"(LP) 1973
- PL/AC The Tramps "Disco Inferno"(single) and (LP) 1973
- PL Lou Rawls "Lou Rawls" (LP) 1973
- PL/AC Eddie Kendricks "Eddie Kendricks"(LP) 1973
- PL/AC Vic Damone "Vic Damone"(LP) 1973
- PL/AC Jean Carne "Jean Carne"(LP) 1973
- PL Barbara Mason "Give Me Your Love" (LP) including the hits
- AC "Yes, I'm Ready", "When I Fall In Love", "Everything I Own"
- "Let Me in Your Life" and "Bed and Board" 1973
- PL/AC First Choice (LP) "Armed and Extremely Dangerous"
- "Running Out of Fools" "A Boy Named Junior"
- "Smarty Pants" 1973
- PL Laura Nyro and LaBelle "Gonna Take A Miracle" 1973
- PL Billy Paul "War of The Gods" (LP) 1973
- PL The O’Jays "Ship Ahoy"(LP) 1973
- PL The Stylistics "Rock and Roll Baby" (LP) 1973
- PL/AC Blue Magic "The Magic of The Blue" (LP)
- "Let Me Be The One"(Single)"Looking For a Friend"(Single) 1974
- PL/AC Blue Magic "Blue Magic (LP) "Look Me Up" "Side Show" "I Just Don’t Want To Be Lonely" "Answer To My Prayer" "Tear It Down" 1974
- PL/AC The Delfonics "Alive and Kicking" (LP) "Think It Over" "I Don’t Want To Make You Wait", "I Told You So" "Start All Over" 1974
- PL Billy Paul "Live in Europe"(LP) 1974
- PL William DeVaughn "Be Thankful For What You Got" (LP) 1974
- PL Nancy Wilson "Now I’m a Woman" (LP) 1974
- PL/AC Blue Magic, Major Harris, Margie Joseph, "Live" "Musical Extravaganza Lights Up The Latin Casino Arranged and Conducted Live on Stage Production 1975
- PL The Three Degrees "International"(LP) 1975
- PL Disco Pak "Get Down With The Philly Sound" (LP) 1975
- PL/AC The Sal Soul Orchestra "The Sal Soul Orchestra"(LP) 1975
- WC/P "Sal Soul Hustle" "Chicago Bus Stop"(Ooh I Love It)"You’re Just The Right Size, "Sal Soul Rainbow" "Tangerine" "Love Letters"
- PL/AC The Sal Soul Orchestra "The Sal Soul Strings"(LP) 1975 -1978
- WC/P "How Deep is Your Love" (LP)
- PL/AC Sal Soul Orchestra, "Electric Lady"(LP) Featuring
- WC/P Artist Carol Williams 1976
- PL/AC The Sal Soul Orchestra "Christmas Jollies"(LP) 1976
- WC/P Sold over 6 Million 1976 to 1997
- PL/AC The Sal Soul Orchestra "Nice N’ Nasty"(LP) 1976
- WC/P "It’s Good For the Soul" "NIce ‘N’ Nasty" "Ritzy Mambo
- PL/AC Fat Larry’s Band(LP) "Feel It" and "Center City" 1976
- PL/AC Astrud Gilberto (LP) "That Girl From Ipanema" 1976
- PL/AC Grace Jones "Portfolio" "Tomorrow" "Send in The Clowns" "What I Did For Love" 1977
- PL/AC The Sal Soul Orchestra "Magic Journey"(LP) 1977
- WC including the Grammy nominated single "Getaway" "Magic Bird of Fire" "Runaway"
- PL/AC The Sal Soul Orchestra (LP)
- WC "Disco Boogie " Super Hits For Nonstop Dancing " 1977
- PL/AC The Sal Soul Orchestra’s Greatest Hits"(LP)
- WC "Music For Nonstop Dancing" Rereleased 1975, 1976, & 1978.
- PL/AC "Charo and The Sal Soul Orchestra" (LP) 1977
- WC "Dance A Little Bit Closer"
- PL/AC The Sal Soul Saturday Night Disco Party (LP) 1978
- PL Gordon Lowe "Follow The Sound"
- PL Monk Montgomery: "Reality" (LP) 1974
- PL William DeVaughn's 1974 album 'Be Thankful For What You Got'
- PL/AC M.F.S.B. "M.F.S.B." "Poinciana" "My One And Only Love"
- All M.F.S.B. (LP's) = Freddies Dead" "Philadelphia Freedom" "M.F.S.B. Summertime" "M.F.S.B. Universal Love" "Love is The Message"
- PL Dee Dee Sharp "Happy ‘bout The Whole Thing"
- N.B. All Sal Soul Orchestra Albums including any 1973 to Present compilations or variations.
- PL/AC The Sal Soul Orchestra "Anthology" (LP) 1995
- WC which including 15 original releases by Montana
- PL Teddy Pendegrass "This One’s For You" (LP) 1980
- PL/AC Harold Melvin and the Blue Notes (LP) 1981 "All Things Happen in Time" PRODUCED FOR ATLANTIC RECORDS: 3 (LP's)
- PL/AC Montana "I Love Music" 1978
- WC/P "A Dance Fantasy Inspired By Close Encounters of The Third Kind" 1978
- Goody Goody (singles): "#1 Dee Jay" (US Billboard #82, 1978) and "It Looks Like Love" (1979)
- PL/AC Tito Puente and India (LP) Count Basie Orchestra 1996
- WC "To Be In Love" and "Love Me"
- PL/AC Mondo Groso (LP) "Closer" (Single) 1997
- PL/AC The Braxtons (LP) "The Boss" 1997
- PL/AC Randy Crawford (LP) "Wishing On a Star" 1997 "Bye Bye" "Johnny" "Changes" "Almaz"
- PL/AC Nuyorican Soul (LP) "Runaway", "Nautilus"
- WC "Sweet Tears" "I Am the Black Gold of the Sun" 1997 "Its Allright" vocals by Jocelyn Brown
- PL/AC Incognito (LP) Jocelyn Brown "Always There" 1997

== Collaborations ==
- A Brand New Me - Dusty Springfield (Atlantic Records, 1970)
- Wilson Pickett in Philadelphia - Wilson Pickett (Atlantic Records, 1970)
- Sweet Sweet Soul - The Sweet Inspirations (Atlantic Records, 1970)
- Gonna Take a Miracle - Laura Nyro (Columbia Records, 1971)
- I Miss You - Harold Melvin & the Blue Notes (Philadelphia, 1972)
- Drowning in the Sea of Love - Joe Simon (Spring Records, 1972)
- Back Stabbers - The O'Jays (Epic Records, 1972)
- To Know You Is to Love You - B. B. King (ABC Records, 1973)
- Spinners - The Spinners (Atlantic Records, 1973)
- Jimmy Ruffin - Jimmy Ruffin (Polydor Records, 1973)
- My Way - Major Harris (Atlantic Records, 1974)
- Bingo - The Whispers (Janus, 1974)
- Friends - B. B. King (ABC Records, 1974)
- Mighty Love - The Spinners (Atlantic Records, 1974)
- Blue Magic - Blue Magic (Atco, 1974)
- The Magic of the Blue - Blue Magic (Atco, 1974)
- Tears on My Pillow - Johnny Nash (CBS Records, 1975)
- Thirteen Blue Magic Lane - Blue Magic (Atco, 1975)
- Jealousy - Major Harris (Atlantic Records, 1976)
- Ten Percent - Double Exposure (Salsoul Records, 1976)
- He's a Friend - Eddie Kendricks (Tamla, 1976)
- Mystic Dragons - Blue Magic (Atco, 1976)
- Goin' Up in Smoke - Eddie Kendricks (Tamla, 1976)
- So Let Us Entertain You - First Choice (Philly Groove, 1976)
- Portfolio - Grace Jones (Island Records, 1977)
- Loleatta - Loleatta Holloway (Gold Mind Records, 1977)
- Delusions - First Choice (Gold Mind Records, 1977)
- France Joli - France Joli (VMC, 1979)
- The Best Love - Jerry Butler (Philadelphia, 1980)
- Mixin' It Up - The Trammps (Atlantic Records, 1980)
- The Spirit's in It - Patti LaBelle (Philadelphia, 1981)
- Keep It Comin' - Jean Knight (Cotillion, 1981)
- All Things Happen in Time - Harold Melvin & the Blue Notes (MCA Records, 1981)
- Changes - Keni Burke (RCA Victor, 1982)
- Let Me Touch You - The O'Jays (Philadelphia, 1987)
- This Christmas - Patti LaBelle (MCA Records, 1990)
- Every Kind of Mood: Randy, Randi, Randee - Randy Crawford (WEA, 1997)
- Fresh Outta 'P' University - Bootsy Collins (Private, 1997)
- Nicole Renée - Nicole Renée (Atlantic Records, 1998)
- Together We Are One - The O'Jays (Philadelphia, 2004)
