= What's Come Over Me =

What's Come Over Me may refer to:

- "What's Come Over Me", a song by Blue Magic from the album Blue Magic (album)
  - "What's Come Over Me", a duet version of the above featuring Margie Joseph from the album Thirteen Blue Magic Lane
- "(What's Come) Over Me", a song by Daniel Amos from the album MotorCycle
- "What's Come Over Me", a song by Frente! from the album Shape (album)
- "What's Come Over Me?", a song by Glenn Lewis and Amel Larrieux from the soundtrack Barbershop (soundtrack)
