= Barry Biggs =

Jamaican reggae singer

- Born: 1946 (age 78–79); St. Andrew, Jamaica
- Genres: Reggae
- Occupation: Singer
- Instrument: Vocals
- Years active: 1960s–present

Barry Biggs (born 1946 St. Andrew, Jamaica) is a Jamaican reggae singer, best known in the UK for his cover of the Blue Magic song, "Sideshow", which got to number 3 in the UK Singles Chart in 1977.

== Career ==
Biggs worked as a recording engineer and cameraman with the Jamaican Broadcasting Company, and also spent time as a member of the band the Astronauts, before becoming the lead singer for Byron Lee's Dragonaires.

It was at Lee's Dynamic Sounds studio (where he also worked as a producer and engineer) that Biggs recorded his first Jamaican hit, a cover of the Osmonds' "One Bad Apple". He broke through to international success in 1976 with "Work All Day", which had been recorded seven years earlier. Biggs had six hit singles on the UK Singles Chart between 1976 and 1981, the most successful of these, "Sideshow", reaching number 3 in January 1977. He recorded two songs with Bunny Lee; "Sincerely" and "You're Welcome" which did well in the reggae charts. He topped the reggae chart in the UK with "Wide Awake in a Dream" and "A Promise Is a Comfort to a Fool".

Many of Biggs' recordings were reggae cover versions of popular soul hits, including songs such as Stevie Wonder's "My Cherie Amour"; "Sideshow" and "Three Ring Circus" by Blue Magic; and others originally by the Chi-Lites, the Moonglows ("Sincerely"), and the Temptations ("Just My Imagination"). His version of "Love Come Down", originally recorded by Evelyn "Champagne" King, was a top 10 hit in 1983 in the Netherlands. Unlike many of his contemporaries, Biggs avoided the political and Rasta themes then popular in Jamaica.

Biggs continued to perform occasionally in the 2000s, notably at a 2008 service of thanksgiving for his former bandleader, Byron Lee.

== Discography ==
=== Studio albums ===
- Mr. Biggs – (1976) – Dynamic Sounds (also issued in 1977 as Side Show)
- Sincerely – (1977) – Dynamic Sounds
- Wide Awake in a Dream – (1980) – Starlight
- A Promise Is A Comfort to a Fool – (1982)
- Barry Biggs & The Inner Circle – (1983) – Trojan
- Coming Down With Love (1983) – Ariola
- So in Love – (1989) – Starlight
- Wide Awake – (1990) – Mango
- Night Like This – (1994) – WEA
- Love Come Down – (2000) – Wesgram Records
- I've Got It Covered – (2021) – Burning Sounds

=== Compilation albums ===
- Sideshow: The Best of Barry Biggs – (1995) – Jamaican Gold
- Vintage Series: Barry Biggs – (2001) – VP
- Just My Imagination – (2002) – Disky Records
- Sideshow: The Very Best of Barry Biggs – (2002) – Music Club
- Sideshow (The best of) – (2004) – Trojan
- Reggae Max – (2007) – Jet Star

=== Singles ===
Year	Title	Peak chart positions			Certifications
Year	Title	BEL	NLD	UK	Certifications
1971	"One Bad Apple"	―	―	―	
1972	"How Could I Let You Get Away"	―	―	―	
1973	"I'm Stone in Love with You"	―	―	―	
1975	"Lonely Girl"	―	―	―	
1976	"You're Welcome"	―	―	―	
1976	"Work All Day"	―	―	38	
1976	"Sideshow"	―	17	3	BPI: Silver
1977	"You're My Life"	―	―	36	
1977	"Three Ring Circus"	―	―	22	
1977	"Sincerely"	―	―	―	
1978	"Give Me a Call"	―	―	―	
1978	"Surely"	―	―	―	
1979	"Too Much Heaven"	―	―	―	
1979	"What's Your Sign Girl?"	―	―	55	
1981	"Wide Awake in a Dream"	―	―	44	
1981	"Love on a Two-Way Street"	―	―	―	
1981	"Promise Is a Comfort to a Fool"	―	―	―	
1981	"You're My Life"	―	―	―	
1982	"This Is Good Life"	―	―	―	
1982	"Break Your Promise"	―	―	―	
1982	"Rain from the Sky"	―	―	―	
1982	"Don't Let the Sun Catch You Crying"	―	―	―	
1983	"One of the Poorest People"	―	―	―	
1983	"Love Come Down"	23	7	―	
1983	"Reflections of My Life" (with Ruddy Thomas)	―	34	―	
1986	"All I Have to Do Is Dream"	―	―	―	
1986	"Conversation"	―	―	―	
1987	"If You Wanna Make Love"	―	―	―	
1987	"Since You've Been Gone"	―	―	―	
1988	"A Night Like This"	―	―	―	
1994	"Time for Love"	―	―	―	
1994	"True Love"	―	―	―	
"—" denotes releases that did not chart.
