= Stop to Start =

Single by Blue Magic

from the album Blue Magic
- B-side: "Where Have You Been"
- Released: 1973
- Studio: Sigma Sound, Philadelphia, Pennsylvania
- Genre: R&B, Philly soul
- Length: 3:20
- Label: Atco
- Songwriter(s): Jimmy Grant, Allan Felder
- Producer(s): Norman Harris

Blue Magic singles chronology
"Look Me Up" (1973)	"Stop to Start" (1973)	"Sideshow" (1974)

"Stop to Start" is a 1973 song by Blue Magic from their eponymous debut album. The single peaked at No. 74 on the Billboard Hot 100, #14 on the R&B chart, and #59 in Canada.

"Stop to Start" was written by James Grant and Allan Felder and produced by Norman Harris.
