= Margie Joseph =

American R&B, soul and gospel singer (born 1950)

- Born: Margaret Marie Joseph; August 19, 1950 (age 76)
- Origin: Gautier, Mississippi, United States
- Genres: Soul, gospel
- Occupations: Singer, songwriter
- Instrument: Vocals
- Years active: 1967–present
- Labels: Okeh, Volt, Atlantic, Cotillion, Atco, H.C.R.C.

Margaret Marie Joseph (born August 19, 1950) is an American R&B, soul and gospel singer. Her greatest success came in the 1970s with a duet with Blue Magic on "What's Come Over Me" and her versions of Paul McCartney's "My Love" and The Supremes' "Stop! In the Name of Love".

== Life and career ==
Margie Joseph was born in Gautier, Mississippi, and sang in her church choir. In 1967, during her time attending Dillard University in New Orleans where she studied speech and drama, she recorded some demos at the Muscle Shoals Sound Studios. This led to her debut on the Okeh label, "Why Does a Man Have to Lie?".

In 1969, she signed with Volt Records, a subsidiary of Stax, and recorded the single "One More Chance" with producer Willie Tee. Her next single, "Your Sweet Lovin'", produced by Freddy Briggs, became her first hit, reaching # 46 on the Billboard R&B chart. Its follow-up, a version of The Supremes' "Stop! In the Name of Love" also became a minor hit on the pop chart (# 96 pop, # 38 R&B). An eight-minute version of the track, arranged by Dale Warren, preceded by an Isaac Hayes-inspired rap entitled "Woman Talk," was featured on her 1971 album, Margie Joseph Makes a New Impression and received a lot of radio air play. Her second album, Phase II, in 1972, also featured a Supremes' cover, "My World Is Empty Without You," but failed to achieve the same success.

She then signed to the Atlantic label and worked on three albums with producer Arif Mardin. Her vocals on her cover of Al Green's "Let's Stay Together" garnered comparisons between her and Aretha Franklin. A string of R&B hits followed, with her version of Paul McCartney's "My Love" becoming her most successful record, reaching # 69 on the Hot 100 and # 10 on the R&B chart in 1974, though Cashbox magazine placed the song at No. 4 R&B. The next album Margie in 1975 is sometimes regarded as her creative peak and contained the singles, "Words (Are Impossible)" and "Stay Still", both reaching the R&B chart. She then recorded a duet version of "What's Come Over Me" with the popular Philadelphia group Blue Magic, giving her another hit (R&B # 11).

In 1976, she moved to Cotillion Records to make the album Hear the Words, Feel the Feeling, produced by Lamont Dozier, the title track reaching # 18 on the R&B chart. Returning to Atlantic, she recorded the album Feeling My Way in 1978 with producer Johnny Bristol, but without great commercial success and she was released from her contract. After recording an album with Dexter Wansel for the WMOT label, which went unreleased after the label closed down, she decided to turn to a teaching career. However, in 1982, she recorded the single "Knockout" for the small H.C.R.C. label and it became her last big hit, reaching # 12 on the R&B chart. She re-signed to Cotillion and recorded the 1984 album Ready for the Night with producer Narada Michael Walden, but was then dropped by the label.

In 1993, hip-hop female trio Salt-N-Pepa used Margie's 1970 single "Your Sweet Lovin'" for their hit single "None of Your Business".

She returned to work in human services, while also recording a gospel album, Latter Rain, released in 2006.

Many of her earlier recordings have been reissued on CD. There is also a CD which features Margie, Blue Magic and Major Harris, recorded live at the Latin Casino in Cherry Hill, New Jersey, released in 2006 on the Collectables label.

== Discography ==
=== Studio albums ===
List of albums, with selected chart positions
Title	Album details	Peak chart positions		
Title	Album details	US	US R&B /HH	UK Disco & Dance
Margie Joseph Makes a New Impression	Released: 1971; Label: Volt (#6012); Format: LP, CD	67	7	—
Phase II	Released: 1972; Label: Volt (#6016); Format: LP, 8 track	—	—	—
Margie Joseph	Released: 1973; Label: Atlantic; Format: LP, CD, digital download	—	21	—
Sweet Surrender	Released: 1974; Label: Atlantic; Format: LP, 8 track, CD, digital download	165	56	—
Margie	Released: 1975; Label: Atlantic; Format: LP, 8 track, CD, digital download	—	53	—
Hear the Words, Feel the Feeling	Released: 1976; Label: Cotillion; Format: LP, 8 track, CD, digital download	—	38	—
Feeling My Way	Released: 1978; Label: Atlantic; Format: LP, CD, digital download	—	—	—
Knockout!	Released: 1983; Label: Houston Connection Recording Corporation; Format: LP, cassette, CD	—	34	—
Ready for the Night	Released: 1984; Label: Cotillion (#790158/1), Atlantic; Format: LP, cassette, CD	—	—	8
Stay	Released: 1988; Label: Ichiban; Format: LP, cassette, CD	—	—	—
Latter Rain	Released: 2006; Label: Sistapraise; Format: CD	—	—	—
"—" denotes releases that did not chart or were not released in that territory.

=== Live albums ===
List of albums, with selected chart positions
Title	Album details	Peak chart positions	
Title	Album details	US	US R&B /HH
Live! (with Blue Magic and Major Harris)	Released: 1976; Label: WMOT (#2-5000); Format: LP, CD, digital download	—	—
"—" denotes releases that did not chart.

=== Singles ===
List of charting singles as a lead artist, with selected chart positions
Title	Year	Chart positions					Album
Title	Year	US	US R&B /HH	US Dance	UK Club	UK Disco & Dance	Album
"Your Sweet Lovin'"	1970	—	46	—	—	—	Non-album single
"Stop! In the Name of Love"	1971	96	38	—	—	—	Margie Joseph Makes A New Impression
"Come Back Charleston Blue" and Donny Hathaway	1972	102	—	—	—	—	Come Back, Charleston Blue
"Let's Stay Together"	1973	—	43	—	—	—	Margie Joseph
"Come Lay Some Lovin' on Me"	1973	—	32	—	—	—	Sweet Surrender
"My Love"	1974	69	10	—	—	—	Sweet Surrender
"Words (Are Impossible)"	1974	91	27	—	—	—	Margie
"Stay Still"	1975	—	34	—	—	—	Margie
"What's Come Over Me" (with Blue Magic)	1975	—	11	—	—	—	Thirteen Blue Magic Lane
"Hear the Words, Feel the Feeling"	1976	—	18	—	—	—	Hear the Words, Feel the Feeling
"Don't Turn the Lights Off"	1976	—	46	—	—	—	Hear the Words, Feel the Feeling
"Come on Back to Me Lover"	1978	—	85	—	—	—	Feeling My Way
"I Feel His Love Getting Stronger"	1978	—	94	—	—	—	Feeling My Way
"Knockout"	1982	—	12	32	—	39	Knockout!
"Ready for the Night"	1984	—	69	—	12	—	Ready for the Night
"Midnight Lover"	1984	—	—	—	12	42	Ready for the Night
"—" denotes releases that did not chart or were not released in that territory.
