= From Out of the Blue =

Studio album by Blue Magic
- Released: 1989
- Genres: Soul, R&B
- Label: OBR/Columbia
- Producers: Vincent Bell, Alvin Moody

Blue Magic chronology
Magic # (1983)	From Out of the Blue (1989)	My Magic Is Real (1995)

From Out of the Blue is an album by the Philadelphia soul group Blue Magic, released in 1989. It was regarded as a comeback album.

The songs "Romeo and Juliet" and "It's Like Magic" were top 40 hits on the Hot R&B Singles chart. "Romeo and Juliet" peaked at No. 89 on the UK Singles Chart.

== Production ==
The album was produced by Vincent Bell and Alvin Moody. It was released via OBR Records, a Def Jam subsidiary that concentrated on R&B and soul.

== Critical reception ==
Professional ratings
Review scores
Source	Rating
AllMusic	3/5 stars
Chicago Tribune	3/4 stars
The Encyclopedia of Popular Music	2/5 stars
New York Daily News	3/4 stars
The Rolling Stone Album Guide	3/5 stars

The Washington Post called the album the group's best to date, writing: "Ted Mills's falsetto is still unearthly; his three bandmates are still super-smooth; and this is the most consistent collection of songs they've ever had. Great falsetto singers such as Mills, Russell Thompkins Jr. of the Stylistics and Eddie Kendricks of the Temptations take the high-pitched excitement of a man in ecstasy and transform it into a permanent state of grace." The Chicago Tribune deemed it "a fine comeback for one of R&B's most promising but unfulfilled groups." The Commercial Appeal determined that "the shimmering falsetto of lead singer Ted Mills hasn't lost any force over the years." The Observer labeled Blue Magic "as sweet and impervious to funk fashion as ever."

== Track listing ==
No.	Title	Length
1.	"It's Like Magic"
2.	"Couldn't Get to Sleep Last Night"
3.	"Secret Lover"
4.	"We're Gonna Make It"
5.	"I Heard You're Going Away"
6.	"From Out of the Blue"
7.	"Take a Long Last Look"
8.	"Romeo and Juliet"
9.	"We Ain't New to This"
10.	"There's a Song in My Head"
11.	"Tuesday Heartbreak"
12.	"The More I Get"
13.	"Break It Out"
14.	"Dancin' to the Flag"
