= Thirteen Blue Magic Lane =

Studio album by Blue Magic
- Released: September 1975
- Recorded: 1975
- Studios: Sigma Sound, Philadelphia, Pennsylvania
- Genre: Philadelphia soul
- Length: 39:54
- Label: Atco
- Producers: Norman Harris, Ron "Have Mercy" Kersey

Blue Magic chronology
The Magic of the Blue (1974)	Thirteen Blue Magic Lane (1975)	Mystic Dragons (1976)

Professional ratings
Review scores
Source	Rating
AllMusic	4/5 stars

Thirteen Blue Magic Lane is the third album by American soul group Blue Magic, produced by Norman Harris and Ron "Have Mercy" Kersey and released in 1975 on the Atco label.

== History ==
The album was recorded at Sigma Sound Studios in Philadelphia and features Sigma's famous house band MFSB. Thirteen Blue Magic Lane is the third of Blue Magic's highly regarded triumvirate of classic Philadelphia soul albums of 1974–1975, admired for its mixture of equally strong ballads and uptempo tracks. "Chasing Rainbows" and "The Loneliest House on the Block" are ballads in the style for which the group had become known, while tracks such as "We're on the Right Track" are seen as being at what was at the time the cutting edge in the development of disco music out of established soul music forms. "What's Come Over Me" is a remake of a track from the group's first album Blue Magic, featuring vocalist Margie Joseph.

== Track listing ==
Side one
No.	Title	Writer(s)	Length
1.	"The Loneliest House on the Block"	Norman Harris, Allan Felder	5:07
2.	"Chasing Rainbows"	Ted Mills	4:11
3.	"Born on Halloween"	Nomran Harris, Allan Felder, Tanya Jones	3:17
4.	"Haunted (By Your Love)"	Ron Tyson, Allan Felder, Bruce Hawes	3:03
5.	"I Like You"	Ted Mills	3:14

Side two
No.	Title	Writer(s)	Length
6.	"Magic of the Blue"	Ron Kersey, Norman Harris, Allan Felder	5:33
7.	"We're on the Right Track"	Norman Harris, Allan Felder	5:45
8.	"Stop and Get a Hold of Yourself"	Pat Cooper, Ron Kersey	5:18
9.	"What's Come Over Me" (with Margie Joseph)	Ted Mills	4:26

== Personnel ==
Blue Magic

- Vernon Sawyer, Wendell Sawyer, Richard Pratt, Ted Mills, Keith Beaton – vocals

Musicians

- Roland Chambers, Bobby Eli, Norman Harris – guitars
- Cotton Kent, Ron Kersey, Ted Mills, Dexter Wansel – keyboards
- Vincent Montana Jr. – vibraphone
- Ronald Baker, Michael Foreman, Rusty Jackmon, Larry LaBes – bass
- Charles Collins, Earl Young – drums
- Robert Cupit, Bunny Harris, Larry Washington – percussion
- Don Renaldo and his Strings and Horns – strings & horns accompaniment

== Production ==
- Norman Harris, Ron "Have Mercy" Kersey – producers, arrangement
- Alan Rubens, Steven Bernstein, Bruce Gable – executive producers
- Carl Paruolo, Kenny Present, Jay Mark – recording engineers
- Dirk Devlin, Mike Huchinson, James Gallagher – assistant engineers
- Nimitr Sarikananda, Wayne Wilfong – mastering
- Richard Rome – arrangement
- Ted "Wizard" Mills – rhythm arrangement

== Charts ==
Chart (1975)	Peak
U.S. Billboard Top LPs	50
U.S. Billboard Top Soul LPs	9

Singles

Year	Single	Peak
Year	Single	US R&B
1975	"Chasing Rainbows"	17
1975	"What's Come Over Me" (with Margie Joseph)	11
