= Mystic Dragons =

Studio album by Blue Magic
- Released: 1976
- Genres: R&B, soul
- Label: Atco
- Producers: Bobby Eli, Blue Magic

Blue Magic chronology
Thirteen Blue Magic Lane (1975)	Mystic Dragons (1976)	Message from the Magic (1978)

Mystic Dragons is an album by the American musical group Blue Magic, released in 1976. It was named after their publishing company. The album peaked at No. 170 on the Billboard Top LPs & Tape and No. 44 on the Soul LP's charts.

== Production ==
The album was produced by Bobby Eli and Blue Magic, with the group later stating that Eli removed some of the personal touches from their work. The group made more of an effort to share responsibilities, with lead singer Ted Mills and vocalist Keith Beaton contributing to the songwriting. Most of the tracks were slower love songs, as the group thought that their audience was not as interested in uptempo songs. They were also concerned that their previous album did not sell as well, and that they had a responsibility to produce songs that could be represented faithfully in concert.

== Critical reception ==
Professional ratings
Review scores
Source	Rating
All Music Guide to Rock	3/5 stars
The Encyclopedia of Popular Music	2/5 stars
The New Rolling Stone Record Guide	3/5 stars
Omaha World-Herald	3/5 stars

The Omaha World-Herald called Blue Magic "a bit more inventive" than most soul groups. The Pittsburgh Press praised "Making Love to a Memory", noting that the lead vocalist was "in his natural range and the harmony emphasized more." The New Pittsburgh Courier stated that Blue Magic "has rapidly become a major vocal group" but opined that Mystic Dragons has "as many valleys as peaks". The Nevada State Journal said that it "alternately soothes and sizzles". The All Music Guide to Rock admired that Mills "was again soaring on the ballads".

== Track listing ==
Side one

1. "Freak-n-Stein"
2. "To Get Love (You Must Give Love)"
3. "See the Bedroom"
4. "Mother Funk"

Side two

1. "Summer Snow"
2. "Rock n Roll Revival"
3. "It's Something About Love"
4. "Making Love to a Memory"
5. "Spark of Love"
