= Saints & Sinners (Johnny Winter album) =

1974 studio album by Johnny Winter

Studio album by Johnny Winter
- Released: February 1974
- Genre: Rock and roll
- Length: 36.39
- Label: Columbia
- Producer: Rick Derringer

Johnny Winter chronology
Still Alive and Well (1973)	Saints & Sinners (1974)	John Dawson Winter III (1974)

Professional ratings
Review scores
Source	Rating
Allmusic	3/5 stars
Christgau's Record Guide	B
Rolling Stone	(not rated)

Saints & Sinners is the sixth studio album by Johnny Winter, released in 1974. It follows Winter's pattern of mixing original songs with cover versions. After covering two Jagger-Richards songs on his previous album and previously issuing a live version of "Jumpin' Jack Flash," he covers a further one in "Stray Cat Blues" on this release.

== Track listing ==
Side one

1. "Stone County" (Richard Supa) - 3:31
2. "Blinded by Love" (Allen Toussaint) - 4:32
3. "Thirty Days" (Chuck Berry) - 3:01
4. "Stray Cat Blues" (Mick Jagger, Keith Richards) - 4:18
5. "Bad Luck Situation" (Johnny Winter) - 2:51

Side two

6. "Rollin' 'Cross the Country" (Edgar Winter) - 4:29
7. "Riot in Cell Block #9" (Jerry Leiber, Mike Stoller) - 3:11
8. "Hurtin' So Bad" (Johnny Winter) - 4:41
9. "Boney Moronie" (Larry Williams) - 2:38
10. "Feedback on Highway 101" (Van Morrison) - 4:27

Bonus track on 1996 CD release

11. "Dirty" (Johnny Winter) - 4:00

== Personnel ==
- Johnny Winter — lead vocals; guitars (tracks 2–10)
- Lani Groves — backing vocals (tracks 1, 2)
- Carl Hall — backing vocals (tracks 1, 2)
- Barbara Massey — backing vocals (tracks 1, 2)
- Tasha Thomas — backing vocals (tracks 1, 2)
- "Sing Sing" Singers — backing chorus (track 3)
- Randy Brecker — trumpet (track 8)
- Louis del Gatto — tenor saxophone (track 8)
- Alan Rubin — trumpet (track 8)
- Jon Smith — saxophone section (track 10)
- Jeremy Steig – flute (track 11)
- Rick Derringer — guitars (tracks 1, 2, 10), ARP strings (tracks 2, 10), bass (tracks 2, 10)
- Edgar Winter — keyboards (tracks 1, 10), organ (track 2, 6, 8), piano (track 2, 3, 7, 8), clavinet (track 2), ARP strings (track 8), backing vocals (tracks 1, 6), saxophone (track 8, 10)
- Dan Hartman — bass (tracks 1, 6), backing vocals (tracks 1, 6), guitars (track 6)
- Randy Jo Hobbs — bass (tracks 3–5, 7–9)
- Bobby Caldwell — drums (track 1, 2, 10), percussion (track 10)
- Richard Hughes — drums (tracks 3–9)
- Kansas — handclaps (track 6)
- Jo Jo Gunne — handclaps (track 9)
