= John Dawson Winter III =

1974 studio album by Johnny Winter

Studio album by Johnny Winter
- Released: November 25, 1974
- Length: 37:49
- Label: Blue Sky Records
- Producer: Shelly Yakus

Johnny Winter chronology
Saints & Sinners (1974)	John Dawson Winter III (1974)	Captured Live! (1976)

Professional ratings
Review scores
Source	Rating
Allmusic	2/5 stars
Christgau's Record Guide	C+

John Dawson Winter III is the seventh studio album by Johnny Winter, released in 1974. It again follows Winter's pattern of mixing original songs with cover versions, including covering an Allen Toussaint song for the second album running.

== Track listing ==
All tracks composed by Johnny Winter; except where indicated

1. "Rock & Roll People" (John Lennon) - 2:44
2. "Golden Olden Days of Rock & Roll" (Vic Thomas) - 3:02
3. "Self-Destructive Blues" - 3:27
4. "Raised on Rock" (Mark James) - 4:42
5. "Stranger" - 3:54
6. "Mind Over Matter" (Allen Toussaint) - 4:14
7. "Roll with Me" (Rick Derringer) - 3:04
8. "Love Song to Me" - 2:05
9. "Pick Up on My Mojo" - 3:21
10. "Lay Down Your Sorrows" (Barry Mann, Cynthia Weil) - 4:09
11. "Sweet Papa John" - 3:07

== Personnel ==
- Johnny Winter - guitar, harmonica, vocals
- Edgar Winter - keyboards, saxophone, vocals
- Rick Derringer - guitar
- Randy Jo Hobbs - bass
- Richard Hughes - drums
- Kenny Ascher - keyboards
- Michael Brecker - saxophone
- Randy Brecker - trumpet
- Lewis del Gatto - saxophone
- Paul Prestopino - steel guitar
- David Taylor - trombone
- Mark Kreider - backing vocals on "Raised on Rock"
