= Bonny B. =

French blues musician

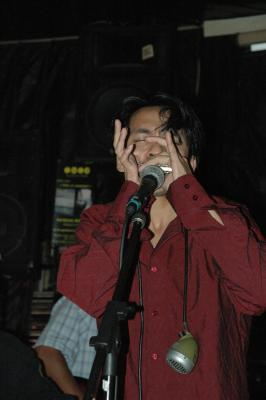
Bonny B. playing the harmonica

Bonny B. (born Su Pheaktra Bonnyface Chanmongkhon, July 20, 1974, Cambodia) is a Cambodian-Swiss blues musician and harmonica player.

== Early life ==
In 1978, his family fled Cambodia, pursued by the Khmer Rouge, and took refuge in the jungle near the Thai border. After three days and three nights running, with no food, they finally found safety in Thailand. In 1979, with the help of Catholic sisters, the family arrived in Fribourg, Switzerland, and asked for political asylum. He started school in 1980 and fought to be accepted and to find a place in the community.

From 1988 to 1991, when he was in high school, he started to like the harmonica and country music: "this time I copied and listened to many country CDs." The school organized a day of entertainment and "hired two bluesmen including one playing the harmonica and the blues came like that. My first CDs were by John Lee Hooker and Muddy Waters and Little Walter, Jimmy Reed, Otis Rush, and all the old black bluesmen of the 50s." He left school and from 1992 to 1995 trained in making pastries and candy, an activity that allowed him to support himself, but music was playing an increasingly important role in his life.

== Career ==
In 1992 he formed his first band, Bonny B. and Spirit of the Blues. They played their first gig two months after they met. Then followed Born to Blues in 1994, the Bonny B. Blues Band in 1996 and the Bonny B. Band in 1998. On the side, he also played in a duo with his brother Michael on guitar. He was also engaged as a sideman with Tom Cat Blake, JC Little and Kevin Flynn, among others. With these various formations, he played 50 to 100 concerts a year in Switzerland and abroad.

In 1994 he opened a school for harmonica and singing. In May 1998, Bonny decided to go to Chicago in search of the blues: "I had to travel there as a pilgrimage." Speaking almost no English, he jammed with Louisiana Red, Buddy Guy, Jimmy Johnson, Kenny Neal, John Primer and Bernard Allison at clubs such as the legendary Blue Chicago, Buddy Guy's Legend and Koko Taylor's. Short of money, he played in bars and on the streets of Chicago to pay for his return ticket.

== Albums and concerts ==
In 1999, Bonny decided to record an album. He teamed up with his old friend, drummer Sal Lombardo, and guitarist Laurent Poget. This collaboration resulted in the album Cambodia, released in Switzerland in March 2000. In March 2001, he released the album Something's Wrong in Europe on Dixiefrog. It is also found in several blues compilations (notably Levis, Blues 2002 compilation). In 2002, he worked with several American artists, including Vic Pitts, Michael J. Robinson, Jesse James King, Sugar Blue, Mark Woodward, Napoleon Washington. In March 2003, he released his second album, If This Is Life, and signed with Universal Music and its sponsor Hohner Harmonica. "We told him that he is one of the best harmonica players and singers from Switzerland. Bonny B. has no equal to breathe the warmth of blues concerts in Switzerland or abroad."

By October 2004, Bonny B. was performing 120 concerts per year. He signed his 1000th contract and traveled throughout Switzerland. In the spring of 2005, he released his third album, I Got the Blues, on the Dixiefrog label and Hard Board. In 2005, he released his debut album Something's Wrong in the U.S. and Canada with the Dixiefrog label. Claude Nobs discovered the last album by Bonny B. and asked him to play at the Montreux Jazz Festival with Alice Cooper. On the side, he decided to explore the blues in public schools and colleges throughout western Switzerland, as part of educational concerts on the history and evolution of the blues. In 2006, he planned to open a school in Cambodia for underprivileged children, financed by the sale of his latest album and concert support.

During his "James Brown Tour" in 2007 (when he was nicknamed the Asian James Brown by the press), he called himself Bonny B. Brown, in honor of one of its masters.

== Other achievements ==
Construction of the school in Cambodia began in November 2007. He has garnered support from his concerts in the sum of 35 000 Swiss francs to complete the project.

In 2008, Bonny B. was hired by Hohner Harmonica as manager of harmonica workshops in all its music stores in Switzerland. He formed his first gospel choir, the IRF-Gospel Singers and organized gospel singing on Stage Giez. Bonny B. was hired as a teacher at the harmonica blues school ETM in Geneva .

On February 28, 2009, on a bet, he became the only harmonica player in the world to play the harmonica for 24 hours nonstop (a Guinness World Record), to raise money for his school in Cambodia. Also in 2009, the first Bonny B. Blues Club opened in Fribourg, where he organized blues concerts with American artists.

His second blues club, the Rock Bottom Blues & Jazz Club, opened in Giez in 2010, in collaboration with Fabienne Decker. In March 2010, Bonny B. recorded his eighth album, which was produced in collaboration with Bob Margolin. He created a blues festival in Giez, held on September 10–12 of that year.

In 2011, he toured with the first edition of the Blues Legend Tour, with Finis Tasby, Bob Margolin, Dave Riley and Bob Stroger. He also released the album Bonny B. Live at Blues Club Fribourg.
