= Pick a Dub =

Remix album by Keith Hudson
- Released: 1974
- Genre: Dub
- Length: 34:23
- Label: Klik Records
- Producer: Keith Hudson

Keith Hudson chronology
Flesh of My Skin Blood of My Blood (1974)	Pick a Dub (1974)	Torch of Freedom (1975)

Pick a Dub is a 1974 album by Jamaican producer and musician Keith Hudson. Critically well received, it is widely regarded as an important work in the dub music genre which evolved out of reggae. Featuring remixes of earlier material, it focuses on heavy drums and bass guitar, with echoing vocals to underscore the intense percussive rhythm. Carlton and Aston Barrett and Augustus Pablo contributed music, while vocal fragments include Hudson, Horace Andy and Big Youth. The album was originally released under the labels of Mamba and Atra, with a 1994 reissue by Blood and Fire.

== Critical reception ==
Professional ratings
Review scores
Source	Rating
Allmusic	5/5 stars

The album has been critically well received and is regarded as important in Hudson's discography and in the genre of dub music. In 1994, The Wire identified the album as "one of the first dub albums" and described it as a "must-have". Lloyd Bradley, author of This is Reggae Music, suggests that along with King Tubby Meets Rockers Uptown, Super Ape and African Dub Chapter Three this album is "one of the supreme heavyweight champion dub sets." Including the album in its 2007 comprehensive series on "1000 Albums to Hear Before You Die", The Guardian indicated that "no other dub album can rival Pick-a-Dub's austere sonic qualities." In England's Dreaming, Jon Savage gives the album his "vote for the greatest dub album ever." Allmusic in its review characterized the album as "a seminal work, a landmark in progressive remixing" that is "arguably the crowning achievement of Hudson's career." While arguing by contrast for Hudson's later album Brand, the website brainwashed indicates that Pick a Dub typically "ranks as the pinnacle of his dub releases".

== Music ==
Pick a Dub consisted of remixes, specifically primarily instrumental "riddim" dubs, of earlier material. Though reworked and retitled, Hudson's track list recast earlier songs into new form. The classics "Declaration of Rights" and "Satta Massagana" were recut as "Black Right" and "Satia". The title track, "Pick a Dub", was a dub of Hudson's own composition "S.90 Skank", which had been a hit song for Big Youth. The album focused on the heavy rhythms of bass guitar and drums, with snippets of otherworldly vocals. The Wire identified as among the album's strengths "[s]tuttering melodica, squelching keyboard and guitar chops and a mix which dropped instruments in and out of the sound picture every few bars". Hudson did not use the processed sound effects that later became common in the movement, a lack cited as "refreshing" by Bradley, who noted that such early sets reflected "the remixer's art in its purest form". The overall effect of Hudson's music is described by brainwashed as "uniquely deep and gothic".

== History ==
The album was recorded with Carlton and Aston Barrett of Bob Marley & The Wailers on drums and bass, with additional music supplied by melodica virtuoso Augustus Pablo. Snippets of vocal tracks included material by Hudson, Horace Andy and Big Youth. It was originally released in 1974 on the Mamba label prior to release by Atra. In 1994, it was reissued by Blood and Fire.

== Track listing ==
All tracks composed by Keith Hudson

1. "Pick a Dub" – 2:38
2. "Black Heart" – 2:40
3. "Michael Talbot Affair" – 2:54
4. "Don't Move" – 2:43
5. "Blood Brother" – 2:54
6. "Dreaded Than" – 2:02
7. "In the Rain" – 3:13
8. "Part 1-2 Dubwise" – 3:17
9. "Black Right" – 3:11
10. "Satia" – 3:06
11. "I'm All Right" – 3:02
12. "Depth Charge" – 2:43

== Personnel ==
- Dennis Alcapone – liner notes
- Aston Barrett – bass
- Carlton Barrett – drums
- Steve Barrow – liner notes
- Phil Hale – photography
- Keith Hudson – arranger, drums, producer
- Kevin Metcalfe – mastering
- Augustus Pablo – melodica
