= Blue Magic (album) =

Studio album by Blue Magic
- Released: January 1974
- Studios: Sigma Sound, Philadelphia, Pennsylvania
- Genre: Philadelphia soul
- Length: 43:35 (original version); 56:25 (expanded reissue)
- Label: Atco
- Producers: Norman Harris, Alan Rubens, Steven Bernstein

Blue Magic chronology
Blue Magic (1974)	The Magic of the Blue (1974)

Singles from Blue Magic
- 1. "Stop to Start" Released: November 6, 1973; 2. "Sideshow" Released: March 27, 1974

Professional ratings
Review scores
Source	Rating
AllMusic	4/5 stars
Christgau's Record Guide	B+
The Rolling Stone Record Guide	3/5 stars

Blue Magic is the debut album by American soul group Blue Magic, produced by Norman Harris and released in 1974 on the Atco label.

== History ==
Blue Magic's debut single "Spell" was released in November 1972 and work on the album began in early 1973. Two more singles, "Look Me Up" and "Stop to Start" were released during 1973; all performed respectably on the R&B chart with "Stop to Start" also crossing over into the lower reaches of the pop chart. The album was released on January 9, 1974, followed shortly thereafter by a fourth single, "Sideshow", the lush, dreamy and loss-filled atmosphere of which immediately caught on and became a major hit, topping the R&B chart and reaching No. 8 on the Billboard Hot 100. Another track on the album was the lengthy "Just Don't Want to Be Lonely", which Ronnie Dyson had taken into the R&B top 30 in July 1973, then became a bigger hit for New York group The Main Ingredient, whose version reached both the R&B and pop top 10 at around the same time Blue Magic was released. Blue Magic peaked at No. 4 on the R&B album chart and No. 45 on the pop chart.

Music for the album was provided by Sigma Sound Studios' legendary house band MFSB. Bobby Eli, co-composer of "Sideshow" and "Just Don't Want to Be Lonely", who worked as a guitarist on the album, stated in the liner notes of the 2007 reissue of the album that he believed that Harris was equally at home with uptempo material as with ballads and, citing the tracks "Look Me Up" and "Welcome to the Club" as classic examples of the proto-disco sound of 1973–74, expressed his opinion that Harris' expertise in this field gave Blue Magic the ability to deliver convincing uptempo tracks in a way which largely eluded other Philadelphia soul groups with whom they are usually bracketed, notably The Stylistics and The Delfonics.

Blue Magic was reissued by Rhino Records in 2007, including two B-sides previously unavailable on CD and a remix of "Look Me Up".

== Track listing ==
Side one
No.	Title	Writer(s)	Length
1.	"Sideshow"	Bobby Eli, Vinny Barrett	4:06
2.	"Look Me Up"	Norman Harris, Allan Felder	5:54
3.	"What's Come Over Me"	Ted Mills	4:09
4.	"Just Don't Want to Be Lonely"	Bobby Eli, Vinny Barrett, John Freeman	7:00

Side two
No.	Title	Writer(s)	Length
5.	"Stop to Start"	Jimmy Grant, Allan Felder	3:18
6.	"Welcome to the Club"	Norman Harris, Allan Felder	5:05
7.	"Spell"	Ted Mills	4:15
8.	"Answer to My Prayer"	Norman Harris, Allan Felder	3:15
9.	"Tear It Down"	Ted Mills, Allan Felder	5:27

2007 remastered reissue bonus tracks
No.	Title	Writer(s)	Length
10.	"Guess Who" (B-side of "Spell")	Mills	3:37
11.	"Where Have You Been" (B-side of "Stop to Start")	Mills, Felder	3:20
12.	"Look Me Up" (Tom Moulton Remix)	Harris, Felder	5:56

== Personnel ==
Blue Magic

- Vernon Sawyer, Richard Pratt, Wendell Sawyer, Keith Beaton, Ted Mills – vocals

Musicians

- Bobby Eli, Norman Harris, Ted Cohen, Roland Chambers – guitars
- Ted Mills, Ron Kersey, Cotton Kent – pianos
- Ronnie Baker, Jimmy Grant, Lee Smith, Jimmy DeJulio – bass
- Earl Young, Larry James – drums
- Larry Washington – percussion
- Vincent Montana Jr. – vibes
- Don Renaldo and his Strings and Horns – strings & horns accompaniment

== Production ==
- Norman Harris – producer, remixing, arrangement
- Alan Rubens, Steven Bernstein – producers, executive producers
- Bruce Gable – executive producer
- Joe Tarsia, Kenny Present, Don Murray, Jay Mark, Carl Paruolo – recording engineers
- Vince Montana – arrangement
- Carl Helm – vocal arrangement

== Charts ==
=== Weekly charts ===
Chart (1974)	Peak position
US Billboard 200	45
US Top R&B/Hip-Hop Albums (Billboard)	4
Canada (RPM Top Albums)	42

=== Year-end charts ===
Chart (1974)	Position
US Top R&B/Hip-Hop Albums (Billboard)	14

=== Singles ===
Year	Single	Peak chart positions			
Year	Single	US	US R&B	US A/C	CAN
1973	"Spell"	—	30	—	—
1973	"Look Me Up"	—	36	—	—
1973	"Stop to Start"	74	14	—	59
1974	"Sideshow"	8	1	35	5
