= Sideshow (song) =

Single by Blue Magic

from the album Blue Magic
- B-side: "Just Don't Want to Be Lonely"
- Released: 1974
- Recorded: 1974
- Studio: Sigma Sound, Philadelphia, Pennsylvania
- Genre: Philadelphia soul
- Length: 4:06
- Label: Atco
- Songwriters: Bobby Eli, Vinnie Barrett
- Producer: Norman Harris

Blue Magic singles chronology
| "Stop to Start" (1973) | "Sideshow" (1974) | "Three Ring Circus" (1974) |

Official audio
- "Sideshow" on YouTube

"Sideshow" is a song recorded by American R&B soul vocal quintet Blue Magic, released in 1974. It was first released on the album Blue Magic and when issued as a single it sold over a million copies, going to No.1 R&B in April 1974 and No.8 pop in the United States that summer. Billboard ranked it as the No.19 song for 1974. In the Canadian Year-end chart, it was No.77.

== Background ==
A visit into an antique museum was the inspiration to write a romance metaphor, which took about four months to finish. Composed by Vinnie Barrett and Bobby Eli (both collaborated on another Philly soul ballad "Love Won't Let Me Wait" by former Delfonics member Major Harris), when record producer and guitarist Norman Harris heard "Sideshow", he said that should be recorded by Blue Magic. Released on the album Blue Magic, it became one of pop music's most affecting ballads and sold over a million copies, going to No.1 R&B and No.8 pop in the middle of 1974.

The song is noted for its introduction, featuring a repeat of the first 10 notes of a slow version of Julius Fucik's "Entrance of the Gladiators", while one of the band's members acts like a master of ceremonies, declaring: "Hurry!! Hurry!!! Step right up! See the saddest show in town for only 50 cents!"

The follow-up song was the similarly themed "Three Ring Circus". Some radio edits fade the song out several seconds early, ahead of the repeat of the introduction in the Coda section, which also featured a reprise of the chorus, due to the length of the song.

== Samples ==
The intro of "Sideshow" was sampled by Chris Brown in "Young Love".

== Notes ==
The Chanter Sisters had a minor hit with a different song with the same title, which reached No.43 in the UK Singles Chart in 1976.

== Chart history ==
=== Weekly charts ===
| Chart (1974) | Peak position |
|---|---|
| Australia (Kent Music Report) | 68 |
| Canada RPM Top Singles | 5 |
| U.S. Billboard Hot 100 | 8 |
| U.S. Billboard Easy Listening | 35 |
| U.S. Billboard R&B | 1 |
| U.S. Cash Box Top 100 | 5 |

=== Year-end charts ===
| Chart (1974) | Rank |
|---|---|
| Canada | 77 |
| U.S. Billboard Hot 100 | 19 |
| U.S. Billboard R&B | 31 |
| U.S. Cash Box | 73 |

== Barry Biggs version ==
- It was covered as a reggae version by Barry Biggs who reached No.3 on the UK Singles Chart with it in January 1977. Biggs also covered the Blue Magic, follow-up release, "Three Ring Circus" (UK No.22).

== Other cover versions ==
- Ray, Goodman & Brown
- Silk
- The Stylistics
- Joss Stone
- Walter Beasley
- Marc Hunter
