= Vinnie Barrett =

American songwriter and musician

- Born: Gwendolyn Hines Woolfolk; 1945 (age 80–81); Washington, D.C., U.S.
- Occupations: Singer, songwriter

Vinnie Barrett (born Gwendolyn Hines Woolfolk; 1945) is an American songwriter and musician.

== Career ==
Barrett graduated from Armstrong High School in Washington, D.C. She studied music at Howard University and the University of the District of Columbia. She started the singing group Vinnie Barrett and the Unlimits in local clubs around Washington D.C., and sang with the Flowerettes, a back up group for Phil Flowers. Syreeta Wright, Valerie Simpson, Diane Warren and Carly Simon were her inspiration for becoming a songwriter. She started writing music at the age of nineteen.

Barrett went to Philadelphia in 1969 where she was privileged to work with Kenny Gamble, Leon Huff and Thom Bell (Philadelphia International Records). Her first solo-written song, "Just Can't Get you Out Of My Mind", appeared on the album Spinners.

She wrote popular songs such as, "Just Don't Want to Be Lonely" (Ronnie Dyson); "Sideshow" and "Three Ring Circus", both performed by Blue Magic; "Love Won't Let Me Wait" performed by Luther Vandross, Major Harris, and other artists (Number 1 record on the Billboard R&B Music Charts); and "Just as Long As We Have Love", performed by Dionne Warwick, and several other artists. Barrett was listed in "Who's Who for Songwriting."

Barrett's last hit song of the late 1990s was "Tranquility", performed by Al Johnson. "Recipe for Love" (CD): songs are "Unconditional Love" performed by Ron Tyson (tenor of the Temptations) and "Before the Real Hurting Starts" performed by Ron Tyson and Freda Payne.

== Awards ==
Barrett won 5 Gold and 4 Platinum records; 4 Gold Albums and a Diamond album (10,000,000) by Super Artist,"Shaggy". Barrett received an AFTRA award in 1975; Best Rhythm and Blues award for "Love Won't Let Me Wait"; 9 Broadcast Music Inc, awards for airplay; The BMI Millionaires award for "Love Won't Let Me Wait" (2,000,000 airplays for songwriter). The BMI Millionaires award for "Sideshow" (2,000,000 airplays for songwriter). The BMI Millionaires award for "Sideshow" (1,000,000 airplays for publisher).

The latest award given in March 2019 is a BMI millionaires award for 2,000,000 Airplays for "Love Won’t Let Me Wait".

RIAA Certified Platinum Video Award "Luther Vandross: Live at Wembley"

Platinum Album, CD, cassette for "Luther Vandross: The best of Love"

Platinum Album, CD, cassette for "Luther Vandross: Any Love"

RIAA Certified Gold Album for Pick of the Litter by The Spinners

Nominated for two Grammy Awards for "Love Won't Let Me Wait" and "Sideshow".

== Singles ==
Columbia records

- One Man Band (LP) Just Don't Want To Be (1973)

Atlantic records

- The Detroit Spinners (LP, Album) Just Can't Get You Out (1973)
- After Loving You / Love Won't Let Me Wait (7", Single) Love Won't Let Me Wait (1974)
- Love Won't Let Me Wait / After Loving You (7", Single) Love Won't Let Me Wait (1974)
- My Way (LP) Love Won't Let Me Wait (1974)
- Then Came You (7", Single) Just As Long As We Have Love (1974)
- RIAA Certified Platinum Video Award "Luther Vandross, "Live at Wembley"
- Platinum Album, CD, Cassette for "Luther Vandross, " The best of Love"
- Platinum Album, CD, Cassette for "Luther Vandross", "Any Love"
- RIAA Certified Gold Album for "SPINNERS", "Pick of the Litter"

Cheri records

- Brooklyn Express / Just Don't Want To Be Lonely (7") Just Don't Want To Be (1974)

ATCO records

- The Magic of the Blue (LP, Album) Three Ring Circus, You (1974)
- Grateful / I Like You (7", Single) Grateful (1976)

WEA Musik GmbH

- The Magic of the Blue (LP, Album, Promo) Three Ring Circus, You (1974)

RCA Victor

- The Choice 4 (LP) Hook It Up, Is It Love (1975)
- Just Don't Want To Be Lonely (12") (1987)

MGM records

- The Ultimate Musical Experience (LP, Album) Telling It Like It Is (1975)

CBS

- With All My Love (LP, Album, Gat) Just As Long As We Have (1980)
- Love Attack (CD, Album) Love Won't Let Me Wait CBS Schallplatten GmbH (1988)

On-U Sound

- Aiming at Your Heart (12") Just As Long As We Hav (1983)

Casablanca records

- Casablanca Dance Classics (Street Edition) (12") Let's Go All The Way (1986)

Germain records

- Just Don't Want To Be Lonely (12") (1987)

Rhino records

- Soul Hits of The '70s – Didn't It Blow Your Mind Vol. 15 Love Won't Let Me Wait (1991).
- Can You Dig It? The '70s Soul Experience (Box + 6xCD, Comp, RM) Sideshow, Love Won't L (2001).

Frituna Reggae 92 (Cass, Dol) Side Show, Just Don't (1992)

Jimco records

- Love Songs (CD, Album) Love Won't Let Me Wait (1993).

Disky

- Reggae Fieber (2xCD, Comp) Sideshow (1997).

Jive records

- Chris Brown (CD, Album) Young Love (2005).

Edsel records

- Life on Mars / What The World Is Coming To (CD) Together Once Again (2005)

Collectables

- The Magic of the Blue (CD) Three Ring Circus, You (2006)

== Notable songs ==
- "Meantime" (Barrett, Vinnie (Ca), Bobby Eli, Keith Thomas, Benjamin "Bebe" Winans)
- "Sideshow" (Eli, Bobby (Ca)/ Barrett, Vinnie (Ca))
- "Bulls Eye" (Barrett, Vinnie (Ca)/ Eli, Bobby (Ca)/ West, Kanye Omari (Ca)/ Johnson, Syleena (Ca))
- "U Turn Me" (Barrett, Vinnie (Ca), Wayne Alexander, Byron Stingily, Andrew Livingstone, Peter Chalcraft)
- "Young Love" (Barrett, Vinnie (Ca)/ Eli, Bobby (Ca)/ Hilson, Keri (Ca)/ Thomas, Damon (Ca)/ Mason, Harvey (Ca)/ Que, J. (Ca)/ Dixon, Antonio (Ca))
- "Lady in Red" (Barrett, Vinnie (Ca)/ Harris, Norman Ray (Ca))
- "Lonely Lover" (Orville Burrell, James Harris Iii, And Terry Lewis, Barrett, Vinnie (Ca), Bobby Eli, John Freeman)
- "Playing Game" (Eli, Bobby (Ca)/ Barrett, Vinnie (Ca)/ Holmes, Cecilia (Ca)/ Kent, Clark (Ca))
- "Man And Woman" (Barrett, Vinnie (Ca), Bobby Eli)
- "Leave Me Alone" (Barrett, Vinnie (Ca), Bobby Eli)
- "Sweet Tomorrow" (Eli, Bobby (Ca)/ Barrett, Vinnie (Ca))
- "Not Like It Was" (Barrett, Vinnie (Ca)/ Eli, Bobby (Ca))
- "Paradise (Life)" (Barrett, Vinnie (Ca), Bruce Hawes (Ca), Robert Miller (Ca), Anthony Cruz (Ca))
- "Just A Little Bit" (Barrett, Vinnie (Ca)/ Freeman, John (Ca)/ Eli, Bobby (Ca)/ Lyon, Andre (Ca)/ Valenzano, Marcello (Ca)/ Milian, Christina (Ca))
- "Talking To Myself" (Eli, Bobby (Ca)/ Barrett, Vinnie (Ca))
- "Three Ring Circus" (Barrett, Vinnie (Ca)/ Eli, Bobby (Ca))
- "Got To Get You Back" (Barrett, Vinnie (Ca)/ Eli, Bobby (Ca))
- "Don't Cross The Line" (Barrett, Vinnie (Ca)/ Eli, Bobby (Ca))
- "Let's Go All The Way" (Barrett, Vinnie (Ca), Bobby Eli)
- "The Cold, Cold Walls" (Barrett, Vinnie (Ca), Cary Gilbert, Von Gray)
- "Save Your Love For Me" (Barrett, Vinnie (Ca), Bobby Eli)
- "Telling It Like It Is" (Barrett, Vinnie (Ca), Bobby Eli)
- "Love Won't Let Me Wait" (Barrett, Vinnie (Ca)/ Eli, Bobby (Ca))
- "A Plain Simple Love Song" (Barrett, Vinnie (Ca)/ Hooker, Frank Ruppert (Ca))
- "Walkin' In The Footsteps" (Barrett, Vinnie (Ca), Bobby Eli)
- "Just Don't Want To Be Lonely" (Barrett, Vinnie (Ca), Bobby Eli, John Freeman)
- "Who Knew My Luck Would Change" (Barrett, Vinnie (Ca)/ Eli, Bobby (Ca))
- "Love Is Just Around The Corner" (Bobby Eli, Barrett, Vinnie (Ca))
- "To Get Love You Must Give Love" (Barrett, Vinnie (Ca), Bobby Eli)
- "Just Can't Get You Out of My Mind" (Barrett, Vinnie (Ca))
- "You Won't Have To Tell Me Gooodbye" (Harris, Norman Ray (Ca)/ Barrett, Vinnie (Ca)/ Hendricks, James Edward (Ca))
