= Blue Magic (group) =

American R&B and soul musical group

- Blue Magic in a 1973 promotional photograph

Background information
- Origin: Philadelphia, Pennsylvania, United States
- Genres: R&B, Philadelphia soul, soul
- Years active: 1972–present
- Labels: ATCO, Capitol, OBR, Mirage

Blue Magic is an American R&B and soul group, and one of the more popular Philadelphia soul groups of the 1970s. Founded in 1972, the group's original members included lead singer Ted Mills with Vernon Sawyer, Wendell Sawyer, Keith Beaton, and Richard Pratt. From 1972 to 1976 they had 6 top twenty hits on Billboard's R&B chart. Their most notable song was a number one R&B hit single entitled, "Sideshow", which peaked at number 8 on Billboard's pop chart. "Sideshow" sold over one million units and was awarded an RIAA gold record certification. Other notable songs included, "Spell", "What’s Come Over Me", "Three Ring Circus", "Look Me Up", "Welcome To The Club" and "Stop to Start".

Blue Magic was inducted into The Atlantic City Walk of Fame, Presented by The National R&B Music Society, on April 28, 2025.

== History ==
=== Origins ===
Blue Magic was formed in Philadelphia, Pennsylvania in 1972 when former member of The Delfonics, Randy Cain, brought in singer-songwriter Ted Mills to do some writing with the Philly-based WMOT production company to create a new band. A short time later the group Shades of Love, featuring Keith Beaton, Richard Pratt, Vernon Sawyer and his brother Wendell, came in to audition. (According to Marc Taylor in his book A Touch of Classic Soul of the Early 1970s, "although the group performed admirably, they lacked a standout lead singer".) The execs decided to replace the Toppicks, the act Mills recorded with. They inserted Shades of Love (which they owned contractually) with Ted Mills and retitled the group Blue Magic. They were signed with Atco Records through WMOT in the same year.

=== First album ===
The group was one of the earliest acts produced by Norman Harris, a Philadelphia recording veteran. The group's harmonies were supported by the MFSB studio house band. Their first song release in 1973 was "Spell" which went onto the US Billboard R&B chart peaking at No. 30 (it was written and co-produced by Mills). They were known for making dreamy ballads and their choreographed stage moves.

Their second release was the uptempo "Look Me Up"; which reached number 36, stayed on the R&B chart for 11 weeks, and was popular on the early disco scene. Their next single was the ballad "Stop to Start". This hit was even more successful, reaching number 14 on the Billboard R&B chart and number 74 on the pop chart. The next single release became their first Billboard US top 10 R&B and Pop hit, "Sideshow". It sold over one million copies, and was awarded a gold disc by the RIAA on August 16, 1974. It climbed to number 8 on the Billboard Hot 100 and topped the R&B chart. The Blue Magic album also went gold. In addition to the four hit singles, it also included another Richard Dickson inspired creation, the hit ballad "What's Come Over Me", a seven-minute rendition of the Main Ingredient million seller "Just Don't Want to Be Lonely", the solid album closer "Tear It Down", and the uptempo "Welcome to the Club".

The first single from their 1975 follow-up album The Magic of the Blue, entitled "Three Ring Circus", also sold well, reaching number 36 in the pop chart and number 5 R&B. MFSB guitarist Bobby Eli and Vinnie Barrett co-wrote both "Sideshow" and "Three Ring Circus".

Because their biggest hits were slower songs, the group became known mostly for their ballads.

=== Success and third album ===
The album Thirteen Blue Magic Lane in 1975 maintained the group's popularity, and spawned their version of the popular dance number "We're on the Right Track", as well as the ballad "Chasing Rainbows". The song "What's Come Over Me" from their debut album was re-worked as a duet with Margie Joseph dubbed in alongside Mills' original lead vocals. The new approach saw the song climb to number 11 on the R&B chart again in 1975. In total, the group had two R&B chart singles in 1975 and four in 1976.

The group had their first world tour that year which lasted for 42 weeks. The tour included 48 states in the United States, five countries in Europe and a 10-day stay in the Philippines. They concluded their tour with a two-week engagement in the Virgin Islands.

Blue Magic were known also for their choreography. As a visually oriented group, they had several major television appearances, including Soul Train, The Mike Douglas Show, The Jerry Blavat Show, Dancin' on Air, and A.M. Philadelphia.

In April 1975, they were chosen as the best new group of the year which earned two Ebony Awards. The first was presented in New York City by Aretha Franklin, the second in Florida by the female recording artist Vanity.

They have shared the stage with other performers such as The Jacksons, Lionel Richie, The Commodores, Marvin Gaye, Gladys Knight & the Pips, Natalie Cole, The Temptations, The Four Tops, The Spinners, Earth, Wind & Fire, New Edition, The Stylistics, Mick Jagger and others.

The group also contributed background vocals for Alyson Williams and the Rolling Stones (on the song "If You Really Want To Be My Friend" from the album It's Only Rock 'n' Roll).

=== Decline in popularity ===
By 1977, the group's popularity had faded with the rise of disco and changing music styles, and despite the group continuing to record consistently they failed to chart. Subsequent label moves to Capitol Records for a reunion with Norman Harris (who had left two years earlier) and then the smaller label Mirage resulted in some smaller R&B charting, but no major success.

=== Disbanding and regrouping ===
Background singer Richard Pratt left in the early 1980s, after sibling singers Vernon and Wendell Sawyer left. The remaining three members Mills, Pratt and Beaton hired two other singers and traveled to Los Angeles, California, to record with Skip Scarborough and some members of the popular group Earth Wind & Fire on the album Message from the Magic.

In 1988, the original group got back together and had some renewed popularity in late 1989 with the album From Out of the Blue. Also in 1989, they appeared on the song "To Be Your Man", the third single from Big Daddy Kane's second album, It's a Big Daddy Thing.

In 1990, The Amsterdam News carried the story of Mills' near-fatal car accident. After surgery in 1996, Mills returned to the music scene as a solo act, recording an album for Casablanca Records that year entitled This Magic Is Real, featuring the remake of "Tear It Down". The other members of the group brought in new lead Rod Wayne (real name Roderick Bronaugh), who remained with the group until 2004. Bronaugh went on to teach at Tennessee State University.

=== The 2000s–present ===
Mills appeared in the touring play, Girl, He Ain't Worth It with The Manhattans, Meli'sa Morgan and Tito Jackson, and appeared in the play Looking for Love in All the Wrong Places. In 2007, Mills recorded the album 3 Tenors of Soul with Russell Thompkins, Jr., original lead singer of The Stylistics, and William Hart of The Delfonics released on Shanachie Records and produced by Bobby Eli.

Mills appeared and gave two concerts for the audiences at the 2014 Soul Train Cruise in February 2014 on the Holland America Eurodam.

On March 11, 2018, Blue Magic reunited to appear on the television series, Unsung on TV One season 12, episode 4.

On July 14, 2018, Mills rescued a man from a burning car on route 22 in Hillside, New Jersey. "I knew it was somebody trapped in there and needed help getting out," said Mills, a Summit resident. "It was flipping in the direction that I was driving."

Former lead Ted Mills continues to pursue a solo career. The name was formally trademarked by Wendell Sawyer and Keith Beaton some years earlier. Vernon Sawyer has his own version of the group, while Richard Pratt led another one at the time of his death in 2022.

Former lead vocalist Rod Wayne died in 2016.

Richard Pratt (born on June 30, 1952) died on March 1, 2022, at the age of 69.

Keith Beaton (born on July 30, 1950) died on January 13, 2023, at the age of 72.

On April 28, 2025 Blue Magic were inducted into the Atlantic City Walk of Fame Presented by, The National R&B Music Society. The Stylistics, Ray, Goodman & Brown, Jean Carne and the late Phyllis Hyman were also inducted.

== Original members ==
- Ted Wizard Mills - lead tenor
- Wendell Sawyer – lead baritone
- Keith "Duke" Beaton – tenor (died 2023)
- Richard Pratt - bass (died 2022)
- Vernon Sawyer- baritone

== Discography ==
=== Studio albums ===
Year	Album	Peak chart positions			Record label
Year	Album	US	US R&B	CAN	Record label
1974	Blue Magic	45	4	42	ATCO
1974	The Magic of the Blue	71	14	—	ATCO
1975	Thirteen Blue Magic Lane	50	9	—	ATCO/WMOT
1976	Mystic Dragons	170	44	—	ATCO/WMOT
1978	Message from the Magic	—	—	—	ATCO
1981	Welcome Back	—	—	—	Capitol
1983	Magic #	—	52	—	Mirage
1989	From Out of the Blue	—	48	—	OBR, Columbia
1995	My Magic Is Real	—	—	—	Hot Prod.
2020	Share a Dream	—	—	—	Essential Media Group
"—" denotes a recording that did not chart or was not released in that territory.

=== Live albums ===
- Live! (with Major Harris & Margie Joseph) (1976, WMOT)

=== Compilation albums ===
- Greatest Hits (1986, Omni)
- The Magic of the Blue: Greatest Hits (1990, Atlantic)
- The Best of Blue Magic: Soulful Spell (1996, Rhino)

=== Singles ===
Year	Single	Peak chart positions					
Year	Single	US	US R&B	US A/C	AUS	CAN	UK
1973	"Spell"	—	30	—	—	—	—
1973	"Look Me Up"	—	36	—	—	—	—
1973	"Stop to Start"	74	14	—	—	59	—
1974	"Sideshow"	8	1	35	68	5	—
1974	"Three Ring Circus"	36	5	26	62	87	—
1975	"Love Has Found Its Way to Me"	—	45	—	—	—	—
1975	"Chasing Rainbows"	—	17	—	—	—	—
1975	"What's Come Over Me" (with Margie Joseph)	—	11	—	—	—	—
1975	"Magic of the Blue"	—	—	—	—	—	—
1976	"Grateful"	104	15	—	—	—	—
1976	"Freak-N-Stein"	—	73	—	—	—	—
1976	"Teach Me (It's Something About Love)"	—	48	—	—	—	—
1976	"Summer Snow"	—	40	—	—	—	—
1977	"I Waited"	—	—	—	—	—	—
1981	"Land of Make-Believe"	—	77	—	—	—	—
1981	"Seems I Haven't Seen Her"	—	—	—	—	—	—
1983	"See Through"	—	—	—	—	—	—
1983	"Magic #"	—	69	—	—	—	—
1983	"Since You Been Gone"	—	—	—	—	—	—
1989	"Romeo and Juliet"	—	20	—	—	—	89
1989	"It's Like Magic"	—	31	—	—	—	—
1989	"Secret Lover"	—	—	—	—	—	—
"—" denotes a recording that did not chart or was not released in that territory.
