= Wilbert Hart =

American singer-songwriter (born 1947)

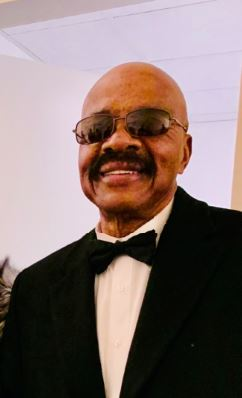
- Hart in 2019

Background information
- Born: October 19, 1947 (age 78); Philadelphia, Pennsylvania, U.S.
- Genres: Soul, R&B
- Occupations: Singer, songwriter, producer
- Instrument: Vocals
- Years active: 1965–present
- Labels: Cameo-Parkway Records Philly Groove Records, Sony BMG, Arista Records, Bell Records

Wilbert "Wil" Hart (born October 19, 1947) is an American soul singer, songwriter, and producer, best known as a founding and last surviving member of the musical group the Delfonics.

== Early life ==
Hart was born and raised in Philadelphia, Pennsylvania, as one of eight children of Wilson and Iretha Hart. He attended Philadelphia public schools and Overbrook High School, where he and his older brother William were in different vocal groups.

== Career ==
=== With The Delfonics ===
Wilbert and William formed the Delfonics in 1965, with William as their primary songwriter, often in collaboration with Thom Bell. Between 1968 and 1974, The Delfonics had a string of hit singles on Philly Groove Records that included "La-La - (Means I Love You)", "Ready Or Not Here I Come (Can't Hide From Love)", and "Didn't I (Blow Your Mind This Time)" among several others that reached the Billboard R&B and Pop charts. In 1971 the group won a Grammy Award for Best R&B Performance, and were featured in the first live televised performance of that ceremony. Also in 1971, the group was awarded a Gold Record for "Didn't I (Blow Your Mind This Time)".

After several years of hit singles, The Delfonics split into two groups in 1975, with Wilbert and William each leading their own units. The brothers were involved in a legal dispute over the use of the group name, with a judge ruling in 2007 that both could use the name while properly informing the audience of the distinction between the two groups. Henceforth, Wilbert's version was called Wil Hart & The Delfonics, or Wil Hart formerly of the Delfonics.

=== Other work ===
Wilbert Hart also worked as a songwriter for other acts while he was active with the Delfonics. In 1970, he wrote and produced three songs for the vocal group Honey & The Bees on their debut album Love. After the original Delfonics disbanded, Hart remained active as a songwriter and producer. In 1977, he contributed to the album This Is Your Life by Norman Connors, and wrote a song under the pseudonym A. Hakeem Waheed.

Hart appeared with his own group on The Arsenio Hall Show in 1989. In 1994 he contributed songwriting and production to the album Break of Dawn by rappers Rob Base and DJ E-Z Rock.

In 1995, Hart and the other original members of The Delfonics were inducted into the Philadelphia Walk of Fame. In 1999 Hart released the solo album Hold on for Love on his own label, Mother Earth Records. In 2005 he released the album Fonic Zone which included a contribution from rapper Rick Ross.

In 1997 the song "Hey! Love", by The Delfonics and written by Hart, was sampled by The Notorious B.I.G. on the successful album Life After Death. In 2018, the Album was RIAA certified 11 times platinum.

In 2013, Hart was featured in "The Story of The Delfonics", an episode of Unsung on TVOne. He was also featured in the 2018 documentary film Mr. Soul! about broadcasting personality and TV/theater producer Ellis Haizlip.

On July 14, 2022, Hart's brother William Hart (co-founder and lead singer of The Delfonics) died after suffering complications during surgery.

As of October 2022, Hart, the only surviving member of The Delfonics, continues to perform and tour with his modern group under the name Wil Hart of The Original Delfonics.

== Personal life ==
Wilbert Hart married his wife Sheila in 1966. They have 12 children, 41 grandchildren, and 12 great-grandchildren. He currently resides in Willingboro, New Jersey.

== Solo discography ==
=== Albums ===
- The Delfonics Return (1981)
- Hold on for Love (1999)
- Fonic Zone (2005)

=== Singles ===
- "Stop Confusion" / "Check Out Your Mind" (unknown date)
- "It's Been A Long Time" (unknown date)
- "Here For You" (2005)
- "Hey Love" (2005)
- "Don't Give In" (2005)
