= Faith Newman (music executive) =

American music executive

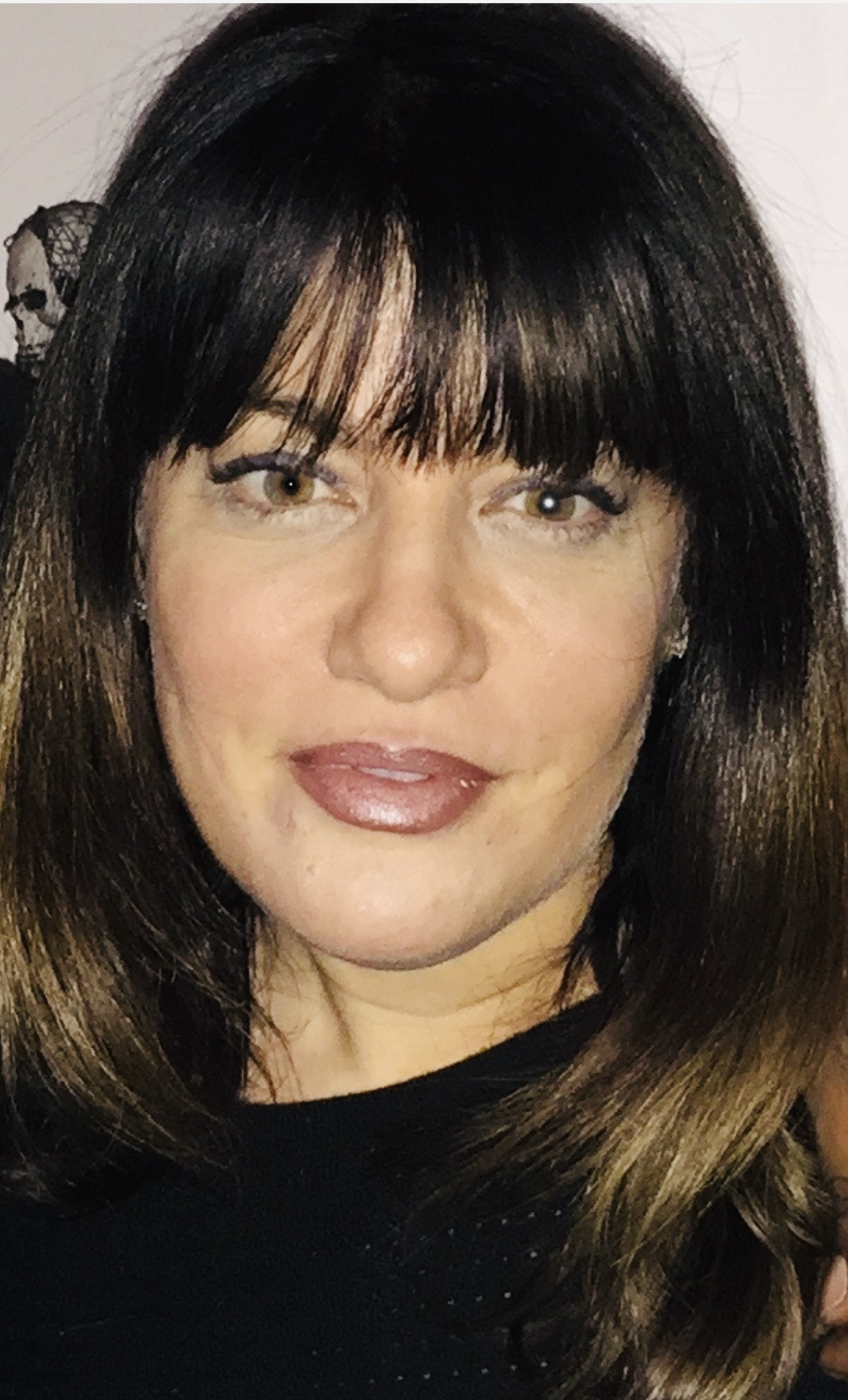

Background information
- Genres: Hip hop, R&B, Contemporary R&B, Rap, Pop
- Occupations: Executive producer, Music executive, A&R executive
- Years active: 1987–present
- Labels: Reservoir Media, Def Jam Recordings, Jive Records, Monarc Entertainment, Columbia Records

Faith Newman is an American A&R executive and music industry leader, best known for signing rapper Nas and co-executive producing his landmark debut album, Illmatic. She has held senior roles at major labels including Def Jam, Columbia Records, and Jive Records, and currently serves as Executive Vice President of A&R and Catalog Development at Reservoir Media. Newman has been featured in Billboard’s Women in Music and R&B/Hip-Hop Power Players lists, and is recognized for her decades-long influence on the development of hip hop and R&B.

== Early life and education ==
She was raised in Philadelphia.. Newman developed a deep connection to the city's rich musical heritage, particularly the "Philly Soul" sound. In a 2014 guest column for Stargayzing, she reflected on the impact of artists like Teddy Pendergrass and Gamble & Huff on her formative years, writing: "Philly Soul is in my blood… the horns, the rhythm section, the strings, the songwriting. It was like candy to me."

She was first introduced to hip hop at age 13 while roller skating in Philadelphia and became interested in a music career at 14 after attending her first concert — The Cars at Spectrum in Philadelphia in 1980.

Her first industry experience was an internship at rap label Select Records, which she secured in 1986 through a connection made after participating in a fashion show at Studio 54.

Newman attended New York University School of Business and Public Administration (now NYU Stern School of Business), where she earned a degree in marketing. While still a student, she was introduced to Russell Simmons through a friend at London Records, which led to an introduction to Rick Rubin. In 1987, she was hired by Simmons and Rubin and became one of the first five employees at Def Jam Recordings at age 21.

== Career ==
=== Def Jam Recordings ===
At Def Jam, she contributed to establishing the company's administrative foundation, including the development of its Artists and Repertoire (A&R) and Publishing divisions. In 1989, Newman was appointed Vice President of A&R, working with artists such as Public Enemy, Slick Rick, and LL Cool J.

=== Columbia Records ===
In 1991, Newman moved to Columbia Records to lead its newly formed hip-hop division, where she signed Nas to his first record deal and Co-Executive Produced his critically acclaimed debut, Illmatic. She was also credited by The Acid Jazz founder/managing director Eddie Piller to signing Jamiroquai and worked with Big L and The Fugees during her tenure.

=== Post-Def Jam Recordings and Columbia Records ===
She later worked at Jive Records, where she led the hip-hop A&R division, and at Monarc Entertainment, founded by Mariah Carey.

=== Reservoir Media ===
In 2011, Newman joined Reservoir Media, where she helped sign artists including 2 Chainz, A Boogie Wit Da Hoodie, Offset (rapper), Young Thug, Killer Mike, and others.

She has also overseen the acquisition of historic catalogs, including those of Philly Groove Records and Nickel Shoe Music, as well as works by The Isley Brothers, Billy Strayhorn, Willie Mitchell, Norman Harris, Allan Felder, Verdine White (of Earth, Wind & Fire), Hoagy Carmichael, Michael Cooper and Felton Pilate (of Con Funk Shun), Leon Ware, Walter Orange and Tommy McClary (of The Commodores), Dallas Austin, Larry Smith, Fred Parris (of The Five Satins), and Marley Marl. She also played a key role in Reservoir's acquisition of Tommy Boy Music, which includes recordings by De La Soul, Naughty By Nature, and House of Pain

In 2026, Reservoir Media signed rapper T.I. to a publishing deal covering his entire catalog and future works; the agreement was announced alongside Reservoir Media CEO Golnar Khosrowshahi and Executive Vice President of A&R and Catalog Development Faith Newman.

== Recognition ==
Newman was recognized on Billboard's R&B/Hip-Hop Power Players list. Newman was also recognized on Billboard's Women in Music Top Executives list in 2022 2023, 2024, 2025 and 2026 as well as on Billboard's R&B/Hip-Hop Power Players list in 2022, 2023, 2024, 2025 and 2026.

In 2023, Newman was among the executives nominated for Billboard's R&B/Hip-Hop Power Players Choice Award.

== Legacy and impact ==
Newman helped sign and develop Nas, whose 1994 debut album Illmatic has been described as a hip-hop classic.

Newman is credited with instigating the Laugh to Keep from Crying project by Philly funk band Nat Turner Rebellion, along with Drexel University students and faculty. The album was released on March 19, 2019, by Drexel University's student-run Mad Dragon label in partnership with Reservoir Media and Vinyl Me, Please.

She currently serves as a board member for The Hip Hop Museum in the Bronx, New York, which is set to open in 2026.

== Personal life ==
Newman resides in Edgewater, New Jersey.

== See also ==
- Women in music
- History of hip hop music
