= La La Means I Love You =

La La Means I Love You may refer to:

- "La-La (Means I Love You)", a song by the Delfonics
- La La Means I Love You (album), an album by the Delfonics
