= Jackie Brown (soundtrack) =

1997 soundtrack album

Jackie Brown: Music from the Miramax Motion Picture

Soundtrack album by Various artists
- Released: December 9, 1997
- Genres: R&B; soul
- Length: 51:06
- Labels: Maverick Records; A Band Apart Records
- Producers: Quentin Tarantino; Lawrence Bender

Professional ratings
Review scores
Source	Rating
Allmusic	4.5/5 stars

Jackie Brown: Music from the Miramax Motion Picture is the soundtrack to Quentin Tarantino's motion picture Jackie Brown. It was originally released on December 9, 1997. The soundtrack uses a variety of music genres, including soul. The soundtrack also includes dialogue from the motion picture and lacks a typical film score, similar to the other soundtracks of Tarantino films.

== Track listing ==
No.	Title	Writer(s)	Artist(s)	Length
1.	"Across 110th Street"	Bobby Womack	Bobby Womack and Peace	3:48
2.	"Beaumont's Lament" (Dialogue)		Samuel L. Jackson and Robert de Niro	0:50
3.	"Strawberry Letter 23"	Shuggie Otis	The Brothers Johnson	4:58
4.	"Melanie, Simone and Sheronda" (Dialogue)		Samuel L. Jackson and Robert de Niro	0:32
5.	"Who Is He (And What Is He to You)?"	Bill Withers	Bill Withers	3:12
6.	"Tennessee Stud"	Jimmy Driftwood	Johnny Cash	2:54
7.	"Natural High"	Charles McCormick	Bloodstone	4:54
8.	"Long Time Woman"	Les Baxter	Pam Grier	2:52
9.	"Detroit 9000" (Dialogue)		Council Cargle	0:07
10.	"(Holy Matrimony) Letter to the Firm"	Inga Marchand; Isaac Hayes; Jean-Claude Olivier; Samuel Barnes	Foxy Brown	3:26
11.	"Street Life"	Joe Sample; Will Jennings	Randy Crawford	4:18
12.	"Didn't I (Blow Your Mind This Time)"	Thom Bell; William Hart	The Delfonics	3:21
13.	"Midnight Confessions"	Lou Josie	The Grass Roots	2:43
14.	"Inside My Love"	Minnie Riperton; Leon Ware; Richard Rudolph	Minnie Riperton	3:56
15.	"Just Ask Melanie" (Dialogue)		Samuel L. Jackson, Robert de Niro, and Bridget Fonda	0:43
16.	"The Lions and the Cucumber"	Manfred Hübler; Siegfried Schwab	The Vampires' Sound Incorporation	5:07
17.	"Monte Carlo Nights"	Elliot Easton	Elliot Easton's Tiki Gods	3:25
Total length:				51:06

== Tarantino's selection process for the songs ==
Tarantino has said that in developing the script for Jackie Brown, he decided on the majority of the songs during the writing stage. He added:

More or less the way my method works is you have got to find the opening credit sequence first. That starts it off from me. I find the personality of the piece through the music that is going to be in it [...] It is the rhythm of the film. Once I know I want to do something, then it is a simple matter of me diving into my record collection and finding the songs that give me the rhythm of my movie.

== Other tracks heard in the film ==
Some of the songs used in the film were not included in the commercially released soundtrack. These songs are listed during the film's credits.

- "Baby Love" by The Supremes
- "Exotic Dance" by Roy Ayers
- "My Touch of Madness" by Jermaine Jackson
- "La-La (Means I Love You)" by the Delfonics
- "Cissy Strut" by The Meters
- "Aragon" by Roy Ayers
- "Brawling Broads" by Roy Ayers
- "She Puts Me in the Mood" by Elvin Bishop
- "Undun" by the Guess Who
- "Escape" by Roy Ayers
- "Vittroni's Theme - King Is Dead" by Roy Ayers
- "Grazin' In The Grass" by Orchestra Harlow
- "Mad Dog (Feroce)" by Umberto Smaila
- "Jizz Da Pitt" by Slash's Snakepit

== Personnel ==
- Quentin Tarantino and Lawrence Bender – Executive album producers
- Mary Ramos and Michele Huznetsky – Music consultants
- Tom Baker – Mastering
- Ann Karlin and John Katovsich – Music coordinators

== Charts ==
=== Weekly charts ===
Weekly chart performance for Jackie Brown
Chart (2021)	Peak position
Hungarian Albums (MAHASZ)	32

== Certifications ==
Region	Certification	Certified units/sales
France (SNEP)	Gold	100,000^{*}
United Kingdom (BPI)	Gold	100,000^{*}
United States	—	321,000
^{*} Sales figures based on certification alone.
