= Alive & Kicking (Delfonics album) =

Studio album by The Delfonics
- Released: 1974
- Studio: Sigma Sound, Philadelphia, Pennsylvania
- Genre: Philadelphia soul
- Length: 43:28
- Label: Philly Groove
- Producer: Stan Watson

The Delfonics chronology
Tell Me This Is a Dream (1972)	Alive & Kicking (1974)	Return (1981)

Professional ratings
Review scores
Source	Rating
AllMusic	2/5 stars

Alive & Kicking is the fifth and final studio album by American vocal group The Delfonics. It was released via Philly Groove Records in 1974.

== Track listing ==
All tracks are written by William Hart, except where noted.

No.	Title	Writer(s)	Length
1.	"Lying to Myself"		4:05
2.	"I Told You So"		3:14
3.	"First Thing on My Mind"		4:32
4.	"Hey Baby"		3:26
5.	"Think It Over"		4:41
6.	"Pardon Me Girl"		2:51
7.	"Seventeen (And in Love)"		4:24
8.	"I Don't Want to Make You Wait"		3:17
9.	"Love Is"		2:20
10.	"Can't Go on Living"	Norman Harris, Allan Felder	3:14
11.	"Start All Over Again"		4:23
12.	"Don't Leave Me"		2:51

== Personnel ==
Credits adapted from liner notes.

Musicians

- Major Harris – vocals
- Wilbert Hart – vocals
- William "Poogie" Hart – vocals
- Cotton Kent – keyboards
- Bobby Eli – guitar
- Norman Harris – guitar
- Ronald Baker – bass guitar
- Earl Young – drums

Technical personnel

- Stan Watson – production
- Tony Bell – arrangement
- Vince Montana – arrangement
- Jay Mark – engineering
- Don Murray – engineering
- Beverly Weinstein – art direction
- Joel Brodsky – photography
- Tom Moulton – compilation executive production
- Reid Whitelaw – compilation executive production

== Charts ==
Chart	Peak position
US Top R&B/Hip-Hop Albums (Billboard)	34
