= I'm Sorry (Delfonics song) =

- Side A of the Australian single

Single by The Delfonics

from the album La La Means I Love You
- B-side: "You're Gone"
- Released: April 1968
- Recorded: 1967
- Genre: R&B, Soul, Philadelphia Soul
- Length: 2:41
- Label: Philly Groove
- Songwriters: Thom Bell, William Hart

The Delfonics singles chronology
"La-La (Means I Love You)" (1967)	"I'm Sorry" (1968)	"Break Your Promise" (1968)

"I'm Sorry" is a R&B/Soul song by the American vocal group The Delfonics, released in April 1968. The song was the Delfonics' second chart single and the follow-up to their smash hit "La-La (Means I Love You)", which went to number 4 on the Billboard Hot 100; "I'm Sorry" was quite reminiscent of their earlier hit, complete with similar-sounding "la la las". "I'm Sorry" just missed the pop Top 40 (peaking at number 42), but was a solid performer on the soul chart, hitting number 15.

== Jonestown Massacre ==
"I'm Sorry", and several other soul tunes, were unintentionally included in the background of Jim Jones' infamous Death tape, an audio recording made during the Jonestown Massacre of November 18, 1978. The music (which sounds muffled and played at off-speed, resembling a church organ in spots) was originally recorded onto the source tape, then recorded over by Jones, resulting in a "ghost recording". "I'm Sorry" can be heard at the very end of the tape after Jones stops talking, played at half-speed.
