= The Delfonics (album) =

Studio album by The Delfonics
- Released: July 21, 1970
- Recorded: 1969
- Genre: R&B, Philadelphia soul, soul
- Length: 33:45
- Label: Philly Groove
- Producer: Stan Watson, Thom Bell

The Delfonics chronology
| Sound of Sexy Soul (1969) | The Delfonics (1970) | Tell Me This Is a Dream (1972) |

Singles from The Delfonics
- 1. "Funny Feeling / My New Love" Released: May 28, 1969; 2. "Didn't I (Blow Your Mind This Time) / Down is Up, Up is Down" Released: December 30, 1969; 3. "Trying to Make a Fool of Me / Baby I Love You" Released: May 17, 1970; 4. "When You Get Right Down to It / I Gave to You" Released: August 28, 1970; 5. "Over and Over" Released: May 28, 1971

Professional ratings
Review scores
| Source | Rating |
|---|---|
| AllMusic | 4.5/5 stars |

The Delfonics is the third studio album by American vocal group The Delfonics. It was released via Philly Groove Records in 1970. It peaked at number 61 on the Billboard 200 chart, making it the most successful album of the group's career.

== Track listing ==
| No. | Title | Writer(s) | Length |
|---|---|---|---|
| 1. | "Didn't I (Blow Your Mind This Time)" | Thom Bell, William Hart | 3:23 |
| 2. | "Funny Feeling" | Thom Bell, William Hart | 2:26 |
| 3. | "When You Get Right Down to It" | Barry Mann | 2:51 |
| 4. | "Baby I Love You" | Thom Bell, William Hart | 3:10 |
| 5. | "Delfonics Theme (How Could You)" | Thom Bell, William Hart | 4:34 |
| 6. | "Trying to Make a Fool of Me" | Thom Bell, William Hart | 3:06 |
| 7. | "Down Is Up, Up Is Down" | Thom Bell, William Hart | 2:33 |
| 8. | "Over and Over" | Thom Bell, William Hart | 3:09 |
| 9. | "Think About Me" | William Hart | 2:39 |
| 10. | "I Gave to You" | William Hart | 5:54 |

== Charts ==
| Chart | Peak position |
|---|---|
| US Billboard 200 | 61 |
| US Top R&B/Hip-Hop Albums (Billboard) | 4 |
