= Tell Me This Is a Dream =

Studio album by The Delfonics
- Released: 1972
- Studio: Sigma Sound, Philadelphia, Pennsylvania
- Genre: Philadelphia soul
- Length: 32:02
- Label: Philly Groove
- Producer: Stan Watson

The Delfonics chronology
The Delfonics (1970)	Tell Me This Is a Dream (1972)	Alive & Kicking (1974)

Professional ratings
Review scores
Source	Rating
AllMusic	2/5 stars

Tell Me This Is a Dream is the fourth studio album by American vocal group The Delfonics. It was released via Philly Groove Records in 1972. It peaked at number 123 on the Billboard 200 chart.

== Track listing ==
No.	Title	Writer(s)	Length
1.	"Hey Love"	Wilbert Hart	3:18
2.	"I'm a Man"	Wilbert Hart	3:02
3.	"Too Late"	Wilbert Hart	2:34
4.	"Love You Till I Die"	William Hart	3:09
5.	"Looking for a Girl"	William Hart	2:48
6.	"Walk Right Up to the Sun"	Norman Harris, Allan Felder	2:58
7.	"Round & Round"	Wilbert Hart	3:09
8.	"Baby I Miss You"	Wilbert Hart	3:18
9.	"Delfonics Theme"	Thom Bell, William Hart	4:15
10.	"Tell Me This Is a Dream"	William Hart	3:31

CD reissue edition bonus tracks
No.	Title	Length
11.	"Think It Over" (7" version)	3:59
12.	"Don't Throw It All Away" (7" version)	3:52
13.	"I Don't Care What People Say" (7" version)	3:48
14.	"Baby I Miss You" (7" mono version)	3:11

== Charts ==
Chart	Peak position
US Billboard 200	123
US Top R&B/Hip-Hop Albums (Billboard)	15
