= Randy Cain =

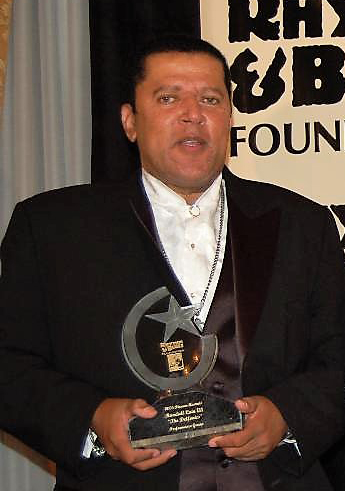
- Randy Cain as part of The Delfonics in 2006

Background information
- Birth name: Herbert Randal Cain III
- Born: May 2, 1945; Philadelphia, Pennsylvania, U.S.
- Died: April 9, 2009 (aged 63); Maple Shade Township, New Jersey, U.S.
- Genres: soul
- Occupation: singer
- Formerly of: The Delfonics

Herbert Randal Cain III (May 2, 1945 – April 9, 2009) was a Philadelphia soul singer with The Delfonics (early 1960s to 1971). He also helped set up the group Blue Magic.

== Life and career ==
Cain was born in Philadelphia, Pennsylvania, United States. Growing up, he befriended two brothers, Wilbert and William Hart. During their attendance at Overbrook High School, Cain joined the Harts' existing vocal group, when a couple of its members dropped out.

During his time with the group, The Delfonics won an R&B Grammy in 1970 for "Didn't I (Blow Your Mind This Time)".

Cain left The Delfonics in 1971, with singer Major Harris taking his place in the line-up. In 1973, while working for recording company WMOT Records, Cain helped introduce singer-songwriter Ted Mills to the vocal group Shades of Love, which Mills would join to form Blue Magic.

== Death ==
Cain died at his home in Maple Shade Township, New Jersey in April 2009, aged 63.
