= Dance Music Report =

- Editor: Stephanie Shepherd
- Former editors: Tom Silverman & Scott Anderson
- Categories: Dance music
- Frequency: Biweekly
- Publisher: Tom Silverman; later also Vince Pellegrino
- First issue: September 1978
- Final issue: 1992
- Country: United States
- Based in: New York City
- Language: English
- ISSN: 0883-1122

Dance Music Report, initially Disco News and later DMR, was a biweekly U.S. trade magazine oriented toward nightclub and radio DJs in the dance music industry. The magazine was first published in September 1978, changed its name from Disco News to Dance Music Report in 1979, and folded in 1992, when it merged with its Canadian counterpart, Streetsound.

The owner of the magazine and its copyright was Disco News, Inc., based in New York City. The magazine was started as a tip sheet by Tom Silverman (who later founded Tommy Boy Records) and two of his college friends, Scott Anderson and Steve Singer, who all lived together in an apartment/office. The magazine was sold mostly through subscriptions, but in its later years was sold in bulk through record stores. The first editors were Silverman and Anderson, followed by Stephanie Shepherd for the last 10 years of its run.

DMR content included North American regional reporting on local music and happenings, retail and radio reports from around the U.S., record pool news, industry updates, an annual readers' poll, and year-end charts with BPMs.

Two of DMR's writers continued in the industry: Cliff Sheppard, columnist for "On The Rap Tip," and as a recording artist - mainly using the moniker Shep-Dog -, writer and producer on the now-defunct indie, Rockaway Records and Gary Hayslett, founder of a magazine called Remix Service Authority, specializing in reviews of releases by remix services. After DMR folded, Hayslett's magazine was renamed to Dance Music Authority and its coverage was expanded to include the same kind of content as DMR.

The annual New Music Seminar was launched in 1980 as a joint venture between Dance Music Report and Rockpool magazines.
