= Sound of Sexy Soul =

Studio album by The Delfonics
- Released: February 11, 1969
- Studio: Cameo-Parkway, Philadelphia, Pennsylvania
- Genre: R&B, Philadelphia soul, soul
- Length: 29:11
- Label: Philly Groove
- Producer: Stan Watson, Thom Bell

The Delfonics chronology
La La Means I Love You (1968)	Sound of Sexy Soul (1969)	The Delfonics (1970)

Singles from Sound of Sexy Soul
- 1. "Ready or Not Here I Come (Can't Hide from Love)" Released: October 22, 1968; 2. "Somebody Loves You" Released: March 4, 1969

Professional ratings
Review scores
Source	Rating
AllMusic	4/5 stars

Sound of Sexy Soul is the second studio album by American vocal group The Delfonics. It was released via Philly Groove Records in 1969. It peaked at number 155 on the Billboard 200 chart.

== Track listing ==
No.	Title	Writer(s)	Length
1.	"Ready or Not Here I Come (Can't Hide from Love)"	Thom Bell, William Hart	2:02
2.	"Let It Be Me"	Gilbert Bécaud, Mann Curtis, Pierre Delanoë	2:23
3.	"Hot Dog (I Love You So)"	Thom Bell, William Hart	2:19
4.	"You Can't Be Loving Him"	Thom Bell, William Hart	2:05
5.	"Ain't That Peculiar"	Smokey Robinson, Ronald White, Marv Tarplin	1:48
6.	"With These Hands"	Benny Davis, Abner Silver	2:15
7.	"Face It Girl, It's Over"	Andy Badale, Frank Stanton	2:59
8.	"Goin' Out of My Head"	Teddy Randazzo, Bobby Weinstein	2:08
9.	"My New Love"	Thom Bell, William Hart	2:50
10.	"Somebody Loves You"	Thom Bell, William Hart	3:21
11.	"Scarborough Fair"	Traditional; arranged by Thom Bell	2:20
12.	"Everytime I See My Baby"	Thom Bell, William Hart	2:41

== Charts ==
Chart	Peak position
US Billboard 200	155
US Top R&B/Hip-Hop Albums (Billboard)	8
