= My Way (Major Harris album) =

Studio album by Major Harris
- Released: 1975
- Recorded: 1975
- Studio: Sigma Sound, Philadelphia, Pennsylvania
- Genre: Soul, Philly soul
- Length: 41:23
- Label: Atlantic
- Producer: Bobby Eli, Melvin and Mervin Steals, Ron "Have Mercy" Kersey, WMOT Productions

Major Harris chronology
My Way (1975)	Jealousy (1981)

Professional ratings
Review scores
Source	Rating
Allmusic	4.5/5 stars

My Way is the debut album by former The Delfonics vocalist Major Harris. Released in 1975 and recorded at Sigma Sound Studios, Harris scored a hit in the United States with the single "Love Won't Let Me Wait". The single hit number five on the pop chart and number one on the soul chart for one week. It was awarded a gold disc by the RIAA. on June 25, 1975.

== Track listing ==
No.	Title	Writer(s)	Length
1.	"Each Morning I Wake Up"	Melvin Steals, Mervin Steals	3:52
2.	"Love Won't Let Me Wait"	Bobby Eli, Vinnie Barrett	5:31
3.	"Sweet Tomorrow"	Bobby Eli, Vinnie Barrett	3:47
4.	"Side Show"	Bobby Eli, Vinnie Barrett	5:09
5.	"Two Wrongs"	Melvin Steals, Mervin Steals	3:34
6.	"Loving You is Mellow"	Bobby Eli, Terry Collins	3:25
7.	"Just a Thing That I Do"	Bobby Eli, Terry Collins	6:35
8.	"After Loving You"	Melvin Steals, Mervin Steals	3:18
9.	"My Way"	Claude François, Gilles Thibaut, Jacques Revaux, Paul Anka	6:12
Total length:			41:23

== Personnel ==
- Major Harris - lead and backing vocals
- Barbara Ingram, Carla Benson, Evette Benton - backing vocals
- Bobby Eli, Norman Harris - guitar
- Bob Babbitt, Ronnie Baker, Rusty Jackmon - bass guitar
- Charles Collins, Earl Young - drums
- Ron "Have Mercy" Kersey - keyboards
- Larry Washington - congas
- Vincent Montana Jr. - vibraphone
- Don Renaldo & His Strings & Horns - strings, horns

Technical

- Alan Rubens, Bruce Gable, Steve Bernstein - co-producers
- Carl Paruolo, Don Murray, Jay Mark, Kenny Present - recording engineer

== Charts ==
Chart (1975)	Peak position
Billboard Top LPs & Tape	28
Billboard Soul Albums	12

=== Singles ===
Year	Single	Chart positions		
Year	Single	US	US R&B	US Dance
1974	"Each Morning I Wake Up"	-	98	3
1975	"Love Won't Let Me Wait"	5	1	-
