= Nervana Systems =

Defunct American cloud computing company

Nervana
- Type: Subsidiary of Intel
- Industry: Artificial intelligence
- Founded: 2014
- Headquarters: San Diego, California, U.S. and Palo Alto, California, U.S.
- Number of employees: 48 (2016)
- Website: nervanasys.com

Nervana Systems was an artificial intelligence software company based in San Diego, California, and Palo Alto, California. The company provided a full-stack software-as-a-service platform called Nervana Cloud that enabled businesses to develop custom deep learning software. On August 9, 2016, it was acquired by Intel, for an estimated $408 million.

== Deep learning framework ==
The company's (now discontinued) open-source deep learning framework is called neon. Neon – which the company said would outperform rival frameworks such as Caffe, Theano, Torch, and TensorFlow – would achieve its performance advantage through assembler-level optimization, multi-GPU support, and use of an algorithm called Winograd for computing convolutions, which are common mathematical operations in the deep learning process.

== Nervana Cloud ==
Nervana Cloud, announced in February 2016, is based on Neon, and ran on Nvidia Titan X GPUs, but Nervana was also developing a custom application-specific integrated circuit (ASIC) called the Nervana Engine that was optimized for deep learning and that Nervana said would perform 10x better than Nvidia Maxwell architecture GPUs. The Nervana Engine was expected to achieve greater compute density by implementing only those design elements necessary to support deep learning algorithms and ignoring legacy elements specific to graphics processing.

== History ==
Nervana was founded in 2014 by CEO Naveen Rao, CTO Amir Khosrowshahi (Dara Khosrowshahi's cousin), and VP Algorithms Arjun Bansal. Nervana has raised $28 million in funding. In June 2015, Nervana raised $20.5 million in series A funding led by Data Collective with participation from Allen & Company, AME Cloud Ventures, Playground Global, the CME Group, Draper Fisher Jurvetson, Fuel Capital, Lux Capital, and Omidyar Network. It was estimated to have only 48 employees when it was acquired by Intel in 2016. In January 2020, Intel shut down the development of Nervana in favor of its acquisition of Habana Labs.
