= Love Won't Let Me Wait =

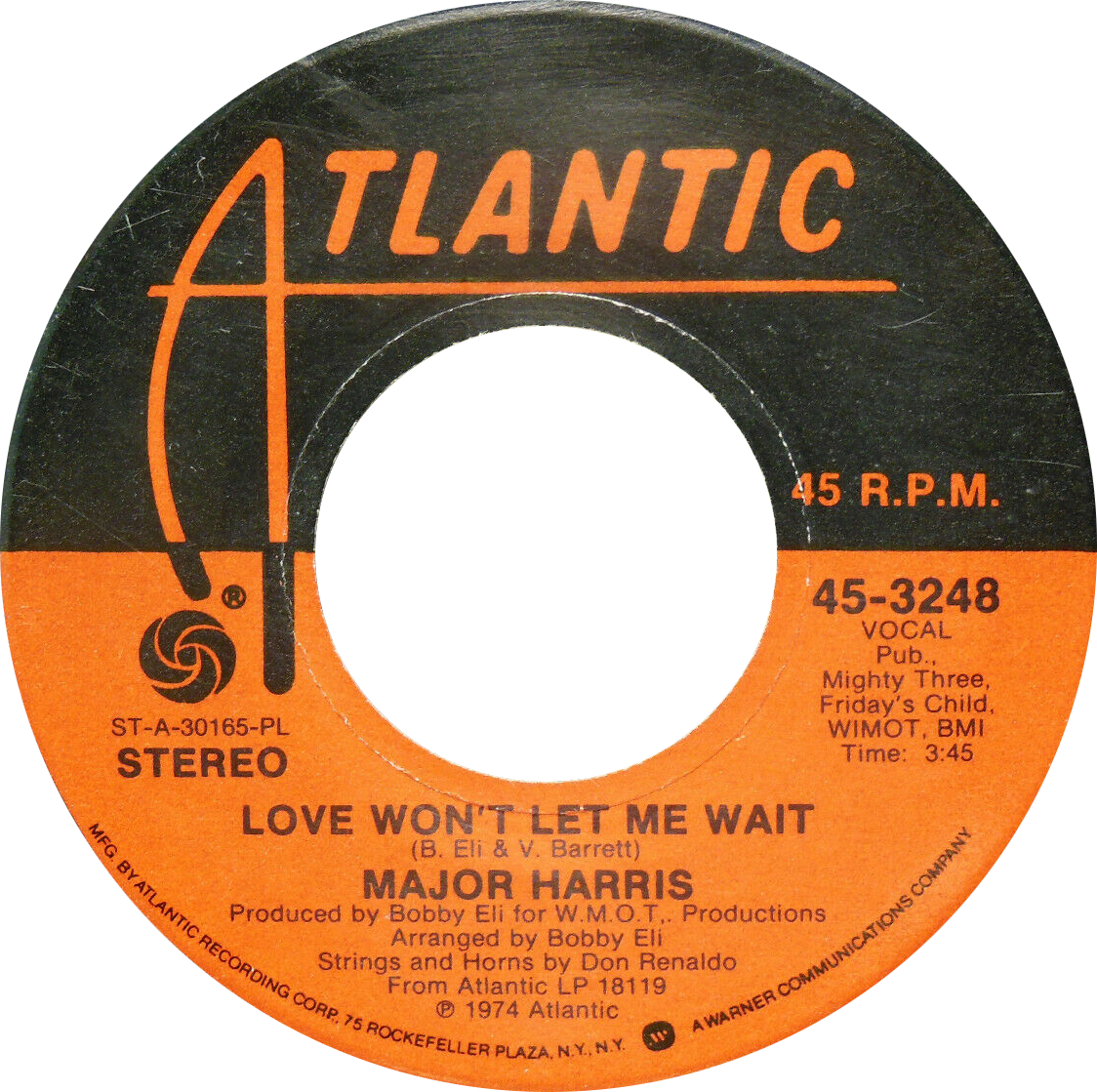
- Side A of US single

Single by Major Harris

from the album My Way
- B-side: "After Loving You"
- Released: March 1975
- Genre: Philadelphia soul
- Length: 5:31 (album version); 3:45 (edit)
- Label: Atlantic
- Songwriters: Vinnie Barrett; Bobby Eli

Major Harris singles chronology
"Love Won't Let Me Wait" (1975)	"Jealousy" (1976)

Audio
- "Love Won't Let Me Wait" on YouTube

"Love Won't Let Me Wait" is a hit 1975 single by Major Harris, a former member of R&B/soul group The Delfonics. Written by Vinnie Barrett and Bobby Eli, the single is considered to be a staple of classic soul playlists, and was Harris' only entry into the top five on both the soul and pop charts. This ballad is noted for the sound of a woman in the throes of sexual pleasure, heard during the instrumental sections of the song. The single hit number five on the pop chart, and also hit number one on the soul chart for one week. Billboard ranked it as the No. 24 song for 1975. It was awarded a gold disc by the R.I.A.A. on 25 June 1975.

== Cover versions ==
Many artists have covered the song. Among the more notable renditions is one by jazz vocalist Nancy Wilson who performed the song in a 1994 episode of the Fox police drama television series New York Undercover. This version also appeared on her 1994 Columbia album, Love, Nancy. Luther Vandross also covered the song for his 1988 album Any Love and his first compilation album 1989's The Best of Luther Vandross... The Best of Love.

== Chart performance ==
=== Major Harris ===
Weekly chart (1975)	Peak position
Australia (Kent Music Report)	85
Canada Top Singles (RPM)	18
Canada Adult Contemporary (RPM)	46
UK Singles Chart	37
US Billboard Hot 100	5
US Billboard R&B Singles	1
US Billboard Easy Listening	33
US Cash Box Top 100	3

Year-end chart (1975)	Rank
Canada	145
US Billboard Hot 100	25
US Cash Box	55

=== Jackie Moore ===
Chart (1980)	Peak position
US Billboard R&B Singles	78

=== Deniece Williams and Johnny Mathis ===
Chart (1984)	Peak position
Canada RPM Adult Contemporary	4
US Billboard Bubbling Under Hot 100	106
US Billboard Adult Contemporary	14
US Billboard R&B Singles	32

=== Nancy Wilson ===
Chart (1994)	Peak position
US Billboard R&B Singles	65
