= Sound Experience =

American musical group

Sound Experience was an American funk ensemble, founded at Morgan State College in Baltimore, Maryland, in 1970.

The group played locally and recorded with producer Stan Watson, recording with him in Philadelphia. They recorded several singles, two full-length albums and live album. A live album entitled Live At The Glen Mills Reform School For Boys was their debut full-length. It was released on GSF Records in 1973. Don't Fight the Feeling was released in 1974 on Philly Soulville Records and reached #57 on the Billboard R&B Albums chart. The title track was released as a single and reached #61 on the US Billboard R&B chart. Their subsequent album, Boogie Woogie, was released on Buddah Records in 1975 to less success.

The ensemble recorded little thereafter, but have been sampled by hip hop groups. Collectables Records issued a CD retrospective of the group's output in 1994. The single "J.P. Walk" was featured in the 1997 movie Boogie Nights.

== Members ==
- Arthur Grant
- Linwood Fraling
- Leroy Fraling
- Melvin Miles
- Reginald Wright
- Johnny Foreman
- Gregory Holmes
- Albert Holmes
- James Lindsey
- Anton Scott
- Everett Harris
- Rodney Parks
