= Dara Khosrowshahi =

Iranian-American business executive (born 1969)

- دارا خسروشاهی
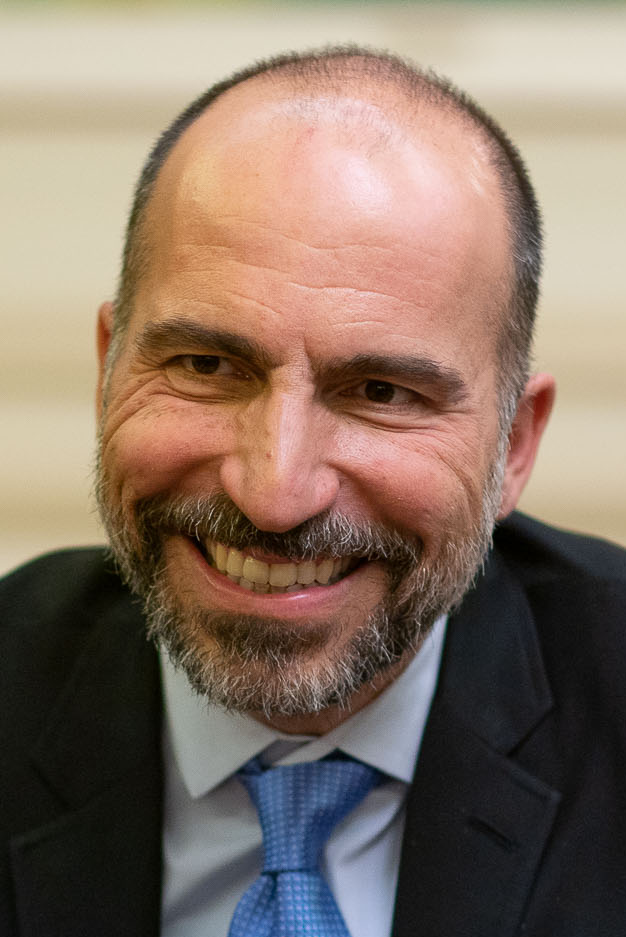
- Khosrowshahi in 2019
- Born: May 28, 1969 (age 57); Tehran, Imperial State of Iran
- Education: Brown University (BS)
- Occupation: CEO of Uber
- Spouse(s): Kathleen Grant (before 2009); Sydney Shapiro (2012–present)
- Children: 4
- Relatives: Hassan Khosrowshahi (uncle)

Dara Khosrowshahi (Persian: دارا خسروشاهی, Persian pronunciation: [dɑː'ɾɑː xosɾo'ʃɑːhiː]; born May 28, 1969) is an Iranian and American business executive who is the chief executive officer of Uber. He was previously CEO of Expedia Group, a company that owns several travel fare aggregators. He is on the board of directors of BET.com and Hotels.com, and was on the board of The New York Times Company.

== Early life and education ==
=== Life in Iran ===
Khosrowshahi was born in 1969 in Iran into a prominent, wealthy family and grew up in a mansion on his family's compound. He is the youngest of three children born to Lili and Asghar (Gary) Khosrowshahi. His family founded the Alborz Investment Company, a diversified conglomerate involved in pharmaceuticals, chemicals, food, distribution, packaging, trading, and services.

=== Refugee in France and the US ===
In 1978, on the eve of the Iranian Revolution, his family fled Iran when he was 9 years old. Their company was later nationalized. Like many other wealthy Iranians, his family fled to France, in his case to southern France. They were planning to come back to Iran upon the political climate improving, but when that did not occur and the subsequent Iran-Iraq war started, they immigrated to the United States, eventually moving in with one of his uncles in Tarrytown, New York. Khosrowshahi's mother had very little money to support her children, and having never worked before in Iran, began working full time to contribute towards her son's education. In 1982, when Khosrowshahi was 13 years old, his father went to Iran to care for his grandfather. The Iranian government subsequently barred his father from leaving the country for 6 years, thus Khosrowshahi spent his teenage years without seeing his father.

=== Studies ===
In 1987, he graduated from the Hackley School, a private university-preparatory school in Tarrytown. In 1991, he graduated with a B.S. in electrical and electronics engineering from Brown University, where he is a member of the social fraternity Sigma Chi.

== Career ==
In 1991, Khosrowshahi joined Allen & Company, an investment bank, as an analyst.

While still a junior employee at the firm, when Khosrowshahi's boss fell sick one day, Khosrowshahi was thus tasked with explaining the numerical figures of a major company deal to Barry Diller. The chance meeting with the billionaire thereafter made a deep impression on Khosrowshahi.

In 1998, he left Allen & Company to work for Barry Diller, first at Diller's USA Networks, where he held the positions of Senior Vice President for Strategic Planning and then president, and later as chief financial officer of IAC, another company controlled by Diller.

In 2001, IAC purchased Expedia, and in August 2005, Khosrowshahi became Expedia's chief executive officer. Ten years later, in 2015, Expedia gave him $90 million in stock options as part of a long-term employment agreement, conditioned on him staying with the company until 2020.

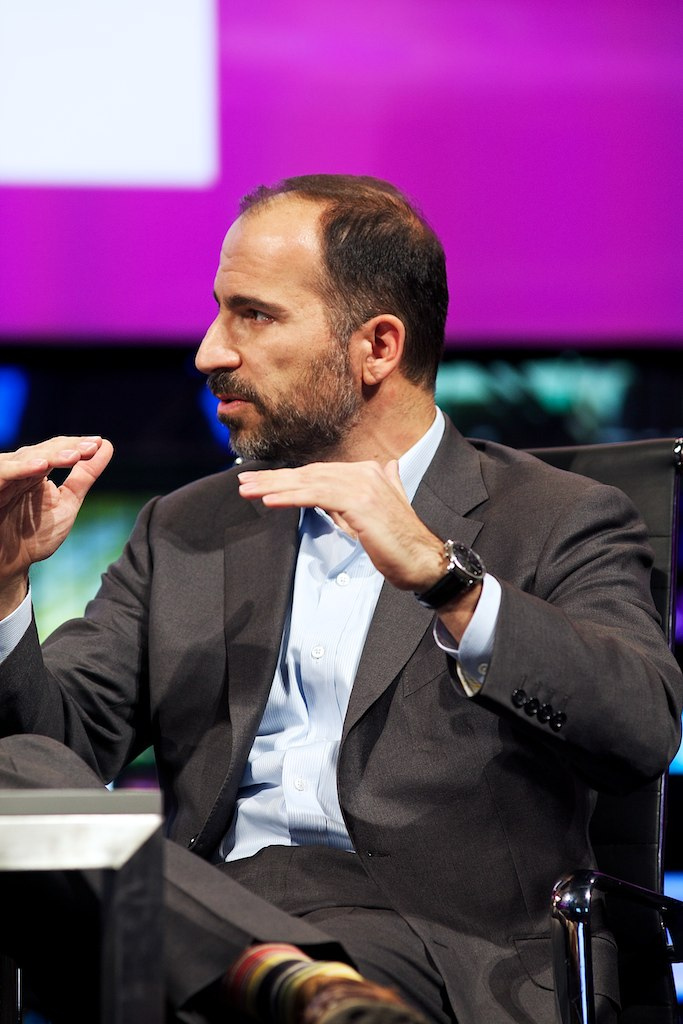
In 2012, during his tenure as CEO of Expedia

In June 2013, he received a Pacific Northwest Entrepreneur of the Year award from Ernst & Young.

In 2016, he was one of the highest paid CEOs in the United States. During his tenure as CEO of Expedia, "the gross value of its hotel and other travel bookings more than quadrupled and its pre-tax earnings more than doubled." Under Khosrowshahi, Expedia extended its presence to more than 60 countries and acquired Travelocity, Orbitz, and HomeAway.

Khosrowshahi was not considering a career move, and initially when approached by a headhunter refused to apply as Uber CEO, but Spotify co-founder Daniel Ek persuaded him during their meetings in 2017.

In August 2017, Khosrowshahi became the CEO of Uber, succeeding co-founder and billionaire Travis Kalanick. He was initially viewed as a "dark horse" candidate in case the initial frontrunners, General Electric's Jeff Immelt and Hewlett Packard Enterprise's Meg Whitman, fell through. However, when Immelt flubbed his presentation, Immelt's initial supporters threw their backing to Khosrowshahi. This included Kalanick, even though Khosrowshahi had made clear that under his watch, Kalanick would have no role in Uber's daily operations; as he put it in one of his slides, "there cannot be two CEOs." After several deadlocked votes, Benchmark, a venture capital firm that had helped lead the effort to push out Kalanick, promised to drop a lawsuit against Kalanick if it named Whitman as CEO. Several of the directors read the announcement as blackmail. One of Whitman's supporters switched his vote to Khosrowshahi, breaking the deadlock and making him Uber's second full-time CEO.

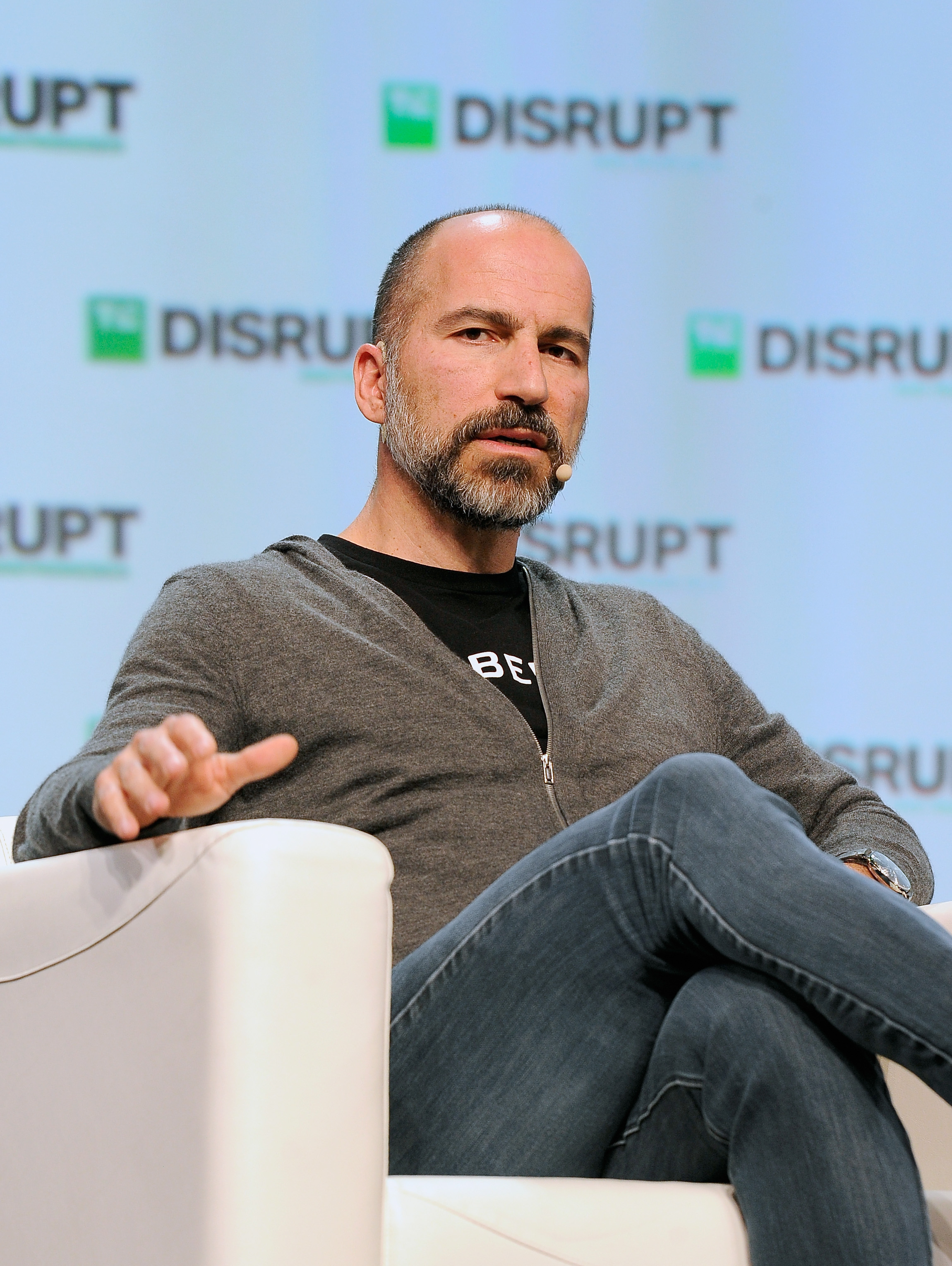
Khosrowshahi speaking at the TechCrunch Disrupt conference in 2018

He forfeited his un-vested stock options of Expedia, then worth $184 million, but Uber reportedly paid him over $200 million to take the CEO position. He is on Uber's board of directors.

Khosrowshahi's main task was to clean up the image of a company that had become one of the most despised in the country, in part due to revelations about Uber's corporate culture. He replaced Kalanick's once-inviolable 14 values, which contained such items as "super pumped" and "always be hustlin'," with eight values focusing on "customer obsession". At all of his public appearances after taking over, Khosrowshahi stressed the message, "We do the right thing. Period."

In May 2019, Khosrowshahi led Uber in its initial public offering, which he addressed with employees in a company-wide letter.

In 2022, Khosrowshahi’s total compensation from Uber rose 22% to $24.3 million. In 2023, Khosrowshahi's total compensation from Uber was $24.2 million, representing a CEO-to-median worker pay ratio of 292-to-1. Khosrowshahi's total compensation for 2024 was $39.4 million, an increase of 63 percent from the previous year.

Khosrowshahi's net worth is estimated to be at least $238 million as of February 2025.

In September 2026, Khosrowshahi announced that Uber would reduce its workforce by 10% and consolidate management layers as part of an effort to streamline the company and increase investment in autonomous vehicles.

== Political activity ==
Khosrowshahi is an outspoken critic of the immigration policy of Donald Trump. In 2016, he donated to the Hillary Victory Fund, Washington Democratic Senator Patty Murray, and the Democratic National Committee. He also donated to Utah Republican Senator Mike Lee, a supporter of libertarianism. Khosrowshahi is a college friend of former Minnesota U.S. Representative Dean Phillips and has supported his congressional races.

In November 2019, Khosrowshahi caused controversy in an interview with Axios on HBO when he compared the assassination of Jamal Khashoggi to the death of Elaine Herzberg by an Uber self-driving car in 2018. He called them both "mistakes" that can "be forgiven". The Saudi government is an investor in Uber and has representation on its board of directors.

== Personal life ==
Khosrowshahi has two children from a first marriage. On December 12, 2012, Khosrowshahi married Sydney Shapiro, a former preschool teacher and actress. The couple have twin sons, both diagnosed with autism spectrum disorder, and Khosrowshahi has appeared as a guest speaker for Autism Partnership Foundation.

His uncle, Hassan Khosrowshahi, fled Iran due to the Iranian Revolution. A cousin, Amir, co-founded Nervana Systems, which was acquired by Intel in 2016 for $408 million. Another cousin, Golnar, founded Reservoir Media in 2007 as a music publishing company.

Khosrowshahi is on the list of "Prominent Iranian-Americans" published by the U.S. Virtual Embassy Iran.

== See also ==
- List of Iranian Americans
- Timeline of Uber
