= Ready or Not Here I Come (Can't Hide from Love) =

"Ready or Not (Can't Hide From Love)"
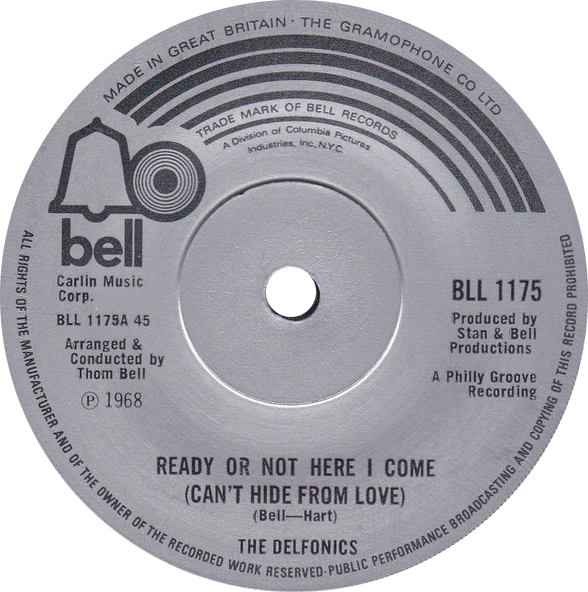
- Side A of the 1971 UK reissue

Single by The Delfonics

from the album The Sound of Sexy Soul
- B-side: "Somebody Loves You"
- Released: October 22, 1968
- Recorded: 1968
- Genre: R&B; soul; Philadelphia soul
- Length: 2:00
- Label: Philly Groove
- Songwriters: Thom Bell; William Hart
- Producers: Thom Bell; Stan Watson

The Delfonics singles chronology
"Break Your Promise" (1968)	"Ready or Not (Can't Hide From Love)" (1968)	"Funny Feeling" (1969)

"Ready or Not Here I Come (Can't Hide from Love)" is a song by American R&B vocal group the Delfonics. The song was produced by Thom Bell and released as a single on October 22, 1968 by Philly Groove Records. The song peaked at number 35 on the U.S. pop chart, and number 14 on the U.S. R&B chart. In the UK, the song peaked at number 41.

The song has been sampled and interpolated in numerous songs, including "Ready or Not" by the Fugees and "Ready or Not" by Bridgit Mendler.

== Charts ==
Chart (1969–1971)	Peak position
UK Singles Chart	41
US Billboard Hot 100	35
US Hot R&B Singles (Billboard)	14

== Cover and samples versions ==
- The song was covered by the Jackson 5 on their 1970 album, Third Album.
- In 1996, the interpolation was used by the Fugees in their single Ready or Not. The song was a top 10 hit in many European countries, including No. 1 in the UK.
- In 1997, the song was sampled by Missy "Misdemeanor" Elliott featuring fellow American rapper Da Brat in "Sock It 2 Me" from Elliott's debut album Supa Dupa Fly.
- In 2012, the song was interpolated by Bridgit Mendler for her song "Ready or Not".
- In 2013, the song was sampled by George Watsky in the song "Moral of the Story" from his album Cardboard Castles.
- In 2025, the song was used in the film One Battle After Another, written and directed by Paul Thomas Anderson.
