= Tom Silverman =

American entertainment executive

- Education: Colby College (B.A.); Western Michigan University (M.A.)
- Occupation: Entertainment executive
- Years active: 1978 – present
- Organization: Tommy Boy Entertainment

Tom Silverman is an American entertainment executive. He is most notable for founding the pioneering hip-hop and electro-funk music label, Tommy Boy Records, now known as Tommy Boy Entertainment.

== Early life and education ==
Silverman grew up in White Plains, New York, and earned a bachelor's degree in environmental science from Colby College in 1976. He also attended graduate school at Western Michigan University, where he majored in environmental geology.

== Career ==
Tom Silverman co-founded the Dance Music Report magazine in 1978, which ran until 1992. He then most notably launched the Tommy Boy Records label in 1981 as its founder and CEO. Many hip-hop artists have accused Silverman and the Tommy Boy label of exploitative business practices and "unfair and unbalanced terms", such as Maseo of De La Soul, GZA of the Wu-Tang clan (on the track "Labels"), and the Gravediggaz (a supergroup made up of former Tommy Boy artists).

Silverman later became a senior vice president at the Warner Music Group from 1986 to 2001, after Warner acquired a 50% stake in Tommy Boy in 1985, although Tommy Boy continued to maintain independent distribution for most releases domestically and all releases internationally during that time. Then as part of his split negotiations from the Warner Music Group in 2001, Silverman co-founded Tommy Boy Films with Kung Faux creator Mic Neumann, which was then merged with Tommy Boy Records in 2002 to create Tommy Boy Entertainment, a newly branded multimedia company with the same iconic trademark, encompassing the original music label, a diverse catalogue of artists, and new audiovisual content.

In 2003, Silverman co-founded the Dance Music Hall of Fame, which was active until 2005. Silverman had also co-founded the annual New Music Seminar, which initially ran for fourteen years from 1980 to 1994, then was subsequently relaunched for another six-year run from 2009 to 2015.

Silverman previously served on the boards of the Rock and Roll Hall of Fame, the Dance Music Hall of Fame, the NARM Manufacturer's advisory board, and the SoundExchange. He also served as a founding board member of the American Association of Independent Music (A2IM and its predecessors NAIRD/AFIM); Merlin Network, a global rights agency representing the world's most important set of independent music rights.

Silverman is the longest continuously serving board member of the Recording Industry Association of America (RIAA). He also serves on the board of the Universal Hip Hop Museum.

Silverman continues to speak at numerous music and trade events including SXSW, Canadian Music Week, Digital Music Forum, In the city, YouBloom, CMJ, NARM, Winter Music Conference, Amsterdam Dance Event, MIDEM, Music and Media, ASCAP New York Sessions, and Leadership Music.

== Awards ==
Silverman received the National Academy of Recording Arts and Sciences Heroes Award in 2000, and he was awarded the NARM Independent Spirit Award in 2010.

In 2013, Silverman was awarded the A2IM Libera Lifetime Achievement Award, and was named to Complex's list of the 25 Best A&R Executives in Hip Hop History, coming in at number seven.
