= La La Means I Love You (album) =

Studio album by the Delfonics
- Released: May 14, 1968
- Genre: R&B, Philadelphia soul, soul
- Length: 31:13
- Label: Philly Groove
- Producer: Stan Watson, Thom Bell

The Delfonics chronology
La La Means I Love You (1968)	Sound of Sexy Soul (1969)

Singles from La La Means I Love You
- 1. "La-La (Means I Love You)" Released: January 26, 1968; 2. "I'm Sorry" Released: April 1968; 3. "Break Your Promise" Released: July 3, 1968

Professional ratings
Review scores
Source	Rating
AllMusic	4.5/5 stars
The Encyclopedia of Popular Music	3/5 stars
The New Rolling Stone Album Guide	3/5 stars

La La Means I Love You is the debut studio album by American vocal group the Delfonics. It was released via Philly Groove Records in 1968. It peaked at number 100 on the Billboard 200 chart.

== Critical reception ==
Lindsay Planer of AllMusic wrote that "[Thom] Bell's trademark easy and languid rhythms, when married to the trio's lush vocal harmonies, add new hues to the sonic soul music palette of the late '60s and early '70s."

In 2004, Philadelphia Weekly placed it at number 17 on the "100 Best Philly Albums of All Time" list. In 2017, Pitchfork placed it at number 154 on the "200 Best Albums of the 1960s" list.

== Track listing ==
No.	Title	Writer(s)	Length
1.	"I'm Sorry"	Thom Bell, William Hart	2:49
2.	"Break Your Promise"	Thom Bell, William Hart	3:04
3.	"The Shadow of Your Smile"	Johnny Mandel, Paul Francis Webster	3:24
4.	"Hurt So Bad"	Teddy Randazzo, Bobby Hart, Bobby Weinstein	2:04
5.	"Losing You"	Thom Bell, William Hart	2:32
6.	"Alfie"	Burt Bacharach, Hal David	2:49
7.	"La-La (Means I Love You)"	Thom Bell, William Hart	3:20
8.	"You're Gone"	Thom Bell, William Hart	2:37
9.	"The Look of Love"	Burt Bacharach, Hal David	3:18
10.	"Can You Remember"	Thom Bell, William Hart	3:02
11.	"A Lover's Concerto"	Sandy Linzer, Denny Randell	2:14

== Charts ==
Chart	Peak position
US Billboard 200	100
US Top R&B/Hip-Hop Albums (Billboard)	15
