= Ready or Not (Fugees song) =

1996 single by Fugees

Single by Fugees

from the album The Score
- Released: September 1, 1996
- Genre: Hip-hop; R&B
- Length: 3:47
- Label: Ruffhouse; Columbia
- Songwriters: Nel Ust Wyclef Jean; Prakazrel Michel; Lauryn Hill; William Hart; Thomas Bell; Enya Brennan
- Producers: Wyclef Jean; Pras; Lauryn Hill; Jerry Duplessis

Fugees singles chronology
"Killing Me Softly" (1996)	"Ready or Not" (1996)	"No Woman, No Cry" (1996)

Music video
- "Ready or Not" on YouTube

"Ready or Not" is a song by American hip-hop group Fugees from their second studio album, The Score (1996). The song contains a sample of "Boadicea" (1987) by Irish singer Enya, and its chorus is based on "Ready or Not Here I Come (Can't Hide from Love)" by the Delfonics. The song was released as the album's third single in Japan on September 1, 1996, and in the United Kingdom the following day. It was not released as a commercial single in the United States, making it ineligible to appear on the Billboard Hot 100.

"Ready or Not" was met with positive reviews from music critics upon its release. In total, the song reached the top ten in fifteen countries. In the United Kingdom, it became the group's second chart-topping single on the UK Singles Chart, following "Killing Me Softly". Additionally, it was one of the best-selling songs of 1996 in the United Kingdom, and remains one of the best-selling hip-hop songs ever in the region. The accompanying music video was directed by film director Marcus Nispel. Several music journalists have cited it as the first rap music video with a seven-figure budget; with the video's production being reported to have cost approximately 1.3 million dollars at the time of its release, making it one of the most expensive music videos ever.

The Rock and Roll Hall of Fame named "Ready or Not" one of the songs that shaped rock and roll. In 2023, Rolling Stone ranked it as one of the best East Coast hip-hop songs of all time. The song inspired the creation of "I Don't Wanna Know" by American R&B artist Mario Winans, which was later partially covered by The Weeknd on record producer Metro Boomin's single "Creepin" alongside 21 Savage.

== Background ==
The song contains a sample of "Boadicea" by new-age singer Enya from her first solo album, Enya (1987). Enya considered suing the Fugees because they had sampled "Boadicea" without her permission. Enya stated, "We were actually on the verge of suing them because of the copyright infringement, because they just didn't approach us. It was a case of, I wasn't featured at all on the credits and it [the sample] was very much a part of the song." However, the singer reached an agreement with the Fugees to an out-of-court settlement after she realized that their music was not gangsta rap. According to Wyclef, "Luckily when Enya heard everything, she was like, 'This is different' and she gave us a pass – which she don't even need to do." The situation was a learning experience for the group, who at the time were unaware of copyright clearance and unfamiliar with publishing procedures.

The song's chorus is based on "Ready or Not Here I Come (Can't Hide from Love)" by the Delfonics, which was an addition suggested by Wyclef Jean. Reflecting on the recording process, Pras said: "At one point, the group had disbanded. Lauryn Hill had left the group at this point and we didn't know what we were going to do. She calls me and says, 'Listen, I'm going to come down to the studio and I'm going to lay down a reference for you guys, a hook. I give you permission to use my hook, my voice, but I don't want to be a part of this group anymore.' I said, 'Fair enough. No problem.' She said, 'Make sure certain people are not around when I'm there.' I said, 'No problem.' She's laying the reference for 'Ready or Not' and then she goes into the bridge and she's crying. I see her crying. She stops and says, 'I can't do this anymore,' and leaves. A couple months later she re-joins the group. She said, 'Let's do 'Ready or Not' again 'cause I was crying. It was emotional.' She goes in the studio to do 'Ready or Not' again. She was in there five hours doing the hook. Every hit is incredible. But we go back and say, 'There's something about that reference. I don't know if we can touch that.' We end up keeping the reference. That's what the world has come to hear. There's something about that record... That's magic."

== Critical reception ==
Larry Flick from Billboard magazine felt the song was "far more representative of the act's vibe", and that "this cut nicely illustrates its lyrical strength as well as its talent for switching from smooth soul singing to sharp rapping within the space of a few seconds." Gil L. Robertson IV from Cash Box named it a standout track of The Score album. Damien Mendis from Music Week's RM Dance Update gave it a full score of five out of five, commenting, "New Jersey's pride and joy return with a soulful blend of rap, R&B and reggae. The original radio version taken from their gold-selling album [...] already won fans due to its hypnotic use of the Delfonics' number 41 hit of 1971 'Ready or Not, Here I Come (Can't Hide from Love)'. The promos even adopt the original Bell label logo colour and style." David Fricke from Rolling Stone remarked "the sweet heat of Lauryn Hill's alto". A reviewer from Spin magazine described the song as "an eerily ambient flow of confused musings (Jean), confident harmonies (Hill), and immigrant pride (Michel), tapped insistently into your consciousness by a simple snare beat."

=== Recognition ===
"Ready or Not" tied with the group's version of "Killing Me Softly" as the best song of year by Spin. In the annual Village Voice's Pazz & Jop mass critics poll of the year's best in music in 1996, it was ranked at number thirteen.

In 2012, NME ranked it number 77 on their '100 Greatest Songs of NME's Lifetime (so far)' list; and placed it on their ranking of the 100 best songs of the 1990s. Pitchfork listed it as one of the '250 Best Songs of the 1990s' (2022). In 2023, Rolling Stone ranked it as one of the 100 best East Coast hip-hop songs of all time.

== Music video ==
The accompanying music video for "Ready or Not" was directed by German director Marcus Nispel. Vibe reported that the video helped usher in the era of bank-breaking, movie-like hip-hop videos. The video featured helicopters, explosions, sharks, chase scenes, and a price tag of 1.3 million US dollars. In justifying the cost, Pras told Vibe "People want to see drama, man. You figure: A kid pays sixteen dollars for your CD. Let him see a good video."

== Legacy ==
Philosopher Alison Stone credits "Ready or Not" as one of the earliest examples of rap-singing, which combines rapped and melodic elements in its vocal parts or with a "straightforwardly melodic" chorus. Lauryn Hill's verse in particular has been noted as precursor for modern melodic rap from singing-rappers like Drake and Young Thug. Hill's verse saw her addressing misogyny in the male dominated hip-hop scene, along with taking aim at gangsta rappers at the height of gangsta rap, while carving out a lane for The Fugees in alternative hip-hop. Journalist William E. Ketchum of Billboard, proclaimed that Hill "is largely considered as the greatest woman rapper of all time", and added that her verse on the song showcases "her bars on full display". Complex named it one of the best rap songs of 1996, and wrote "Like much of the East Coast hip-hop from the '90s, "Ready or Not" was rough around the edges, informed by the harsh realities of life in the ghetto. But instead of relying on fictitious tough talk, the song harnessed that energy for positive, referencing the strength of Bob Marley, Muhammad Ali, and Haitian refugees passing through Guantanamo Bay."

"Ready or Not" has often received praise for its strategic use of sampling. The song's use of the sampling the Enya song "Boadicea" from the Stephen King movie Sleepwalkers (1992), marked one of the earliest rap songs to sample from a horror movie soundtrack. "Ready or Not" also aided in further exposing music from Enya and The Delfonics to a generation of hip-hop audiences through sampling, with the song "Boadicea" being sampled numerous times by other artists following the release of "Ready or Not". Chris Tart of HotNewHipHop wrote "Most hip-hop songs derived from something from the parent generation, and this one is no exception. The creative juice that melted the Delfonics, Enya and some Brooklyn-based refugees is very much a cause for celebration. "Ready or Not "; is one of the greatest moments in rap history."

== Cover versions and samples ==
=== Cover versions ===
The song was covered by British-Dutch house music artist the Course. It charted at number five on the UK Singles Chart in April 1997. In 2012, the Fray did a cover of this song on their album Scars & Stories. Drum and bass band Rudimental gave their take of the song at Glastonbury Festival in 2013. It was later covered again in 2016 by British singer Laura Mvula. English singer Jorja Smith performed her rendition of the song during concerts in 2018. American rapper Rapsody would also cover the song for the inaugural performance at The Shed.

=== Samples and interpolations ===
The song "I Don't Wanna Know" by American R&B artist Mario Winans and rapper Diddy, is based on a sample of the song, which was later partially covered by The Weeknd on record producer Metro Boomin's single "Creepin" alongside 21 Savage. Both songs reached the top five on the Billboard Hot 100. Disney star Bridgit Mendler released a song of the same name in 2012, which was also based on an interpolation of "Ready or Not".

It has also been sampled by artists such as Fredo and Summer Walker on their song "Ready", by Meek Mill on his song of the same name, Bastille on "Forever Ever", Busta Rhymes alongside Chance the Rapper on the song "Hello", and Natti Natasha's "No Quiero Saber". The song was sampled by Cuban DJ Maceo Plex on his track "Under the Sheets", which was ranked on the list of 'Top 60 EDM Love Songs of All Time' (2023) by Billboard.

Furthermore, the song "Helpless" composed by Lin-Manuel Miranda for the Broadway musical Hamilton, was inspired by the track. American rapper 50 Cent interpolated the chorus for his song "High All the Time", from his debut album Get Rich or Die Tryin' (2003).

== Usage in media ==
In 1996, Intel developed an interactive video game inspired by the song's music video.

During Barack Obama's 2008 presidential campaign, Blender magazine published a list of his top ten favorite songs, and "Ready or Not" topped the list. The song was covered by Will Ferrell, who portrayed George W. Bush during an episode of Saturday Night Live, in December 2015.

In 2016, a video of the rapper Drake reciting the lyrics to the song at the age of 8, went viral on the internet; the song would later be covered by Sunday Service Choir, during Drake's benefit concert alongside Kanye West to advocate for the prison release of Larry Hoover. In 2018, the clothing brand Afield Out released a capsule collection that paid homage to "Ready or Not". Actress Gina Rodriguez received backlash after reciting the word "niggas" while singling along to the song in a video; she later issued a public apology.

British grime rapper Stormzy name dropped it in his song "Mel Made Me Do It", R&B singer Chris Brown also referenced the song on the Chloe Bailey track "How Does It Feel".

The song was used in the first theatrical trailer of the 2015 film Mission: Impossible – Rogue Nation. "Ready Or Not" was played during the final trailer for season two of the Marvel based Netflix series Luke Cage. It was later featured in the film trailer for Creed III, which was shown during Super Bowl LVII.

The NBA TV documentary of the same name (2021), was titled and themed after the song. American mixed martial artist Sean Soriano, used it for his walkout song during UFC Fight Night 198. A remixed version of the song featuring the main vocal is played at the Tottenham Hotspur Stadium during the audio-visual build up ahead of Tottenham Hotspur's home games.

Professional wrestling legends Scott Hall and Kevin Nash used this song during their tenure in World Championship Wrestling (WCW) as the tag team duo The Outsiders (professional wrestling) during house shows. Scott Hall would also use the song during a brief stint in 2000 for the defunct promotion Extreme Championship Wrestling (ECW).

== Track listings ==
- UK CD1
1. "Ready or Not" (radio version) – 3:47
2. "Ready or Not" (Salaam's Ready for the Show remix) – 4:24
3. "Ready or Not" (Handel's Yaard Vibe mix) – 4:41
4. "The Score" – 4:32
- UK CD2
1. "Ready or Not" (album version) – 3:50
2. "How Many Mics" – 4:23
3. "Freestyle" – 5:03
4. "Blame It on the Sun" – 5:41

== Charts ==
=== Weekly charts ===
Chart (1996–1997)	Peak position
Australia (ARIA)	24
Austria (Ö3 Austria Top 40)	17
Belgium (Ultratop 50 Flanders)	6
Belgium (Ultratop 50 Wallonia)	6
Canada Adult Contemporary (RPM)	54
Canada Dance/Urban (RPM)	18
Denmark (IFPI)	5
Europe (Eurochart Hot 100)	3
Europe (European Dance Radio)	2
Finland (Suomen virallinen lista)	2
Germany (GfK)	8
Iceland (Íslenski Listinn Topp 40)	1
Ireland (IRMA)	2
Israel (Israeli Singles Chart)	1
Italy (Musica e dischi)	6
Macedonia (Macedonian Singles Chart)	1
Netherlands (Dutch Top 40)	3
Netherlands (Single Top 100)	3
New Zealand (Recorded Music NZ)	8
Norway (VG-lista)	8
Poland Airplay (Music & Media)	14
Scottish Singles Sales (Official Charts)	5
Spain Airplay (Music & Media)	7
Sweden (Sverigetopplistan)	3
Sweden (Swedish Dance Chart)	2
Switzerland (Schweizer Hitparade)	23
UK Singles (Official Charts)	1
UK Hip Hop/R&B (Official Charts)	1
US Radio Songs (Billboard)	69
US R&B/Hip-Hop Airplay (Billboard)	22
US Rhythmic Airplay (Billboard)	34

Chart (2013)	Peak position
France (SNEP)	128

=== Year-end charts ===
Chart (1996)	Position
Australia (ARIA)	99
Belgium (Ultratop 50 Flanders)	74
Belgium (Ultratop 50 Wallonia)	42
Europe (Eurochart Hot 100)	44
Germany (Media Control)	54
Iceland (Íslenski Listinn Topp 40)	21
Israel (Israeli Singles Chart)	8
Netherlands (Dutch Top 40)	88
Netherlands (Single Top 100)	63
New Zealand (RIANZ)	34
Sweden (Topplistan)	40
Sweden (Swedish Dance Chart)	27
UK Singles (OCC)	24

== Certifications ==
Region	Certification	Certified units/sales
Denmark (IFPI Danmark)	Gold	45,000^{‡}
Germany (BVMI)	Gold	250,000^{‡}
Italy (FIMI) sales since 2009	Gold	50,000^{‡}
United Kingdom (BPI)	2× Platinum	1,200,000^{‡}
United States (RIAA)	Platinum	1,000,000^{‡}
^{‡} Sales+streaming figures based on certification alone.

== Release history ==
Region	Date	Format(s)	Label(s)	Ref.
Japan	September 1, 1996	Mini-CD (with "No Woman, No Cry")	Sony	
United Kingdom	September 2, 1996	CD; cassette	Ruffhouse; Columbia	
