= Tommy McLain =

American musician (1940–2025)

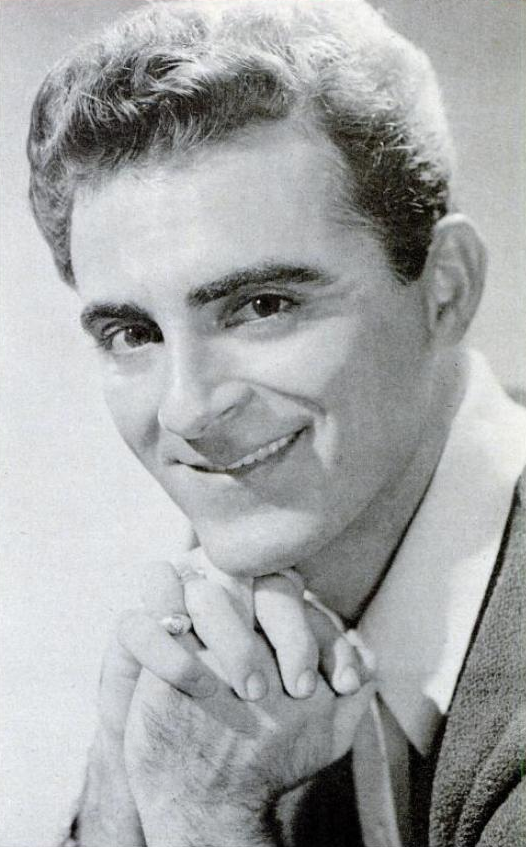
- McLain in 1966

Background information
- Born: March 15, 1940; Jonesville, Louisiana, U.S.
- Died: July 24, 2025 (aged 85) Hessmer, Louisiana, U.S.
- Genre: Swamp pop
- Occupation: Musician
- Instruments: Vocals; keyboards; drum; bass guitar; fiddle

Thomas Murray McLain (March 15, 1940 – July 24, 2025) was an American musician, best known as a singer but who also played keyboards, drums, bass guitar, and fiddle.

== Life and career ==
McLain was born in Jonesville, Louisiana, on March 15, 1940. He first began performing in the 1950s, along with country singer Clint West. The two were both members of The Vel-Tones in the late 1950s and the Boogie Kings in the 1960s, and they recorded a duet, "Try to Find Another Man", in 1965. He also performed on Dick Clark's Caravan of Stars in the 1960s and DJed at Louisiana radio station, KREH. McLain's greatest fame was with his recording of the song "Sweet Dreams", which hit No. 15 on the U.S. Billboard Hot 100 chart in 1966. In Canada it was No. 7. It reached No. 49 in the UK Singles Chart the same year.

He also wrote Freddy Fender's hit single, "If You Don't Love Me Alone (Leave Me Alone)". McLain appears along with the Mule Train Band in the film The Drowning Pool. McLain used to perform in the American Deep South with his backing group, the Mule Train Band.

In October 2007, McLain was inducted into the Louisiana Music Hall of Fame.

McLain was more recently featured as a guest artist on an album recorded by Larry Lange and his Lonely Knights of Austin, Texas, entitled Wiggle Room (2011), which debuted two brand new songs penned by McLain; perhaps the most notable one being, "Don't Make Me Leave New Orleans", a heart-felt ballad that McLain wrote in the aftermath of Hurricane Katrina.

British singer Lily Allen included McLain's cover of Fats Domino's song "Before I Grow Too Old" as one of her eight favorite songs on the British radio programme Desert Island Discs, on 29 June 2014.

On August 26, 2022, McLain released his first album in over 40 years, entitled I Ran Down Every Dream. This collaboration included 11 songs written by McLain and credits with numerous others including Elvis Costello, Nick Lowe (both of whom contribute co-writes), plus Jon Cleary, Denny Freeman, Ed Harcourt, Roy Lowe, Augie Meyers, Ivan Neville, Van Dyke Parks, Mickey Raphael, Steve Riley, Speedy Sparks, Warren Storm and others.

McLain died in Hessmer, Louisiana on July 24, 2025, at the age of 85.

== See also ==
- List of 1960s one-hit wonders in the United States
