= The Delfonics =

American R&B/soul group

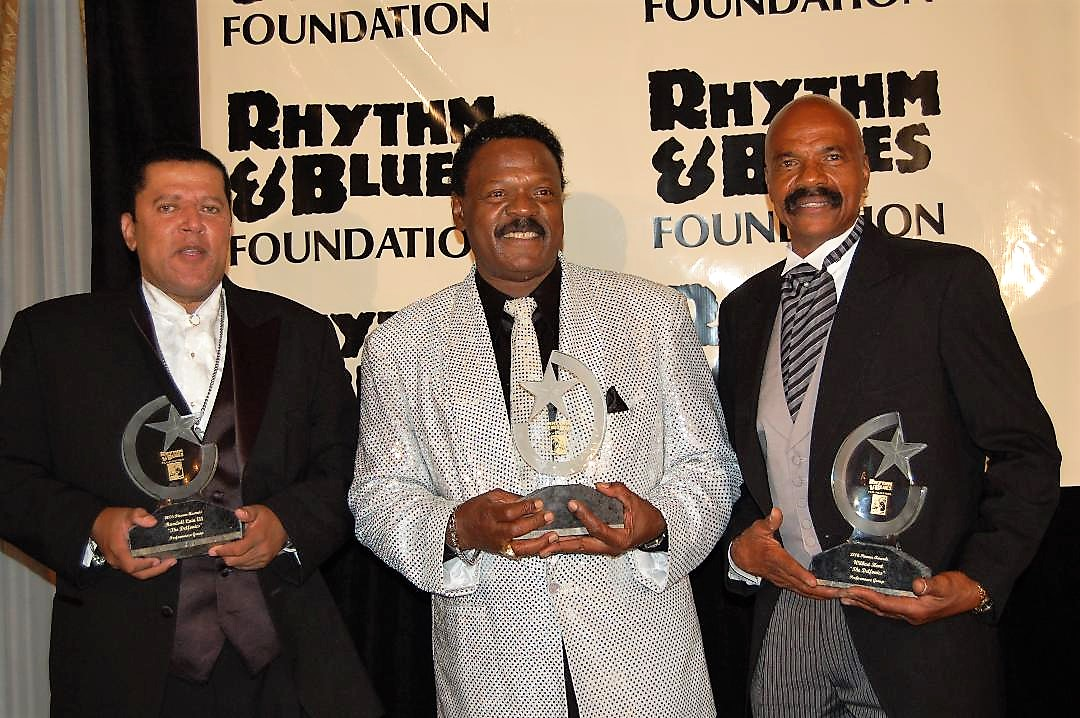
- The Delfonics at The Rhythm & Blues Foundation in 2006. L-R: Randy Cain, William Hart and Wilbert Hart

Background information
- Origin: Philadelphia, Pennsylvania, U.S.
- Genres: R&B, Philadelphia soul, soul
- Years active: 1965–1975 (original Delfonics); 1970s–present (different incarnations led by former members)
- Labels: Philly Groove Records, La La Records, Poogie Records
- Past members: Wilbert Hart; William Hart; Major Harris; Randy Cain

The Delfonics were an American R&B/soul vocal group from Philadelphia, gaining most popularity in the late 1960s and early 1970s. Their most notable hits include "La-La (Means I Love You)", "Didn't I (Blow Your Mind This Time)", "Break Your Promise", "I'm Sorry", and "Ready or Not Here I Come (Can't Hide from Love)". Their hit songs were primarily written by lead vocalist and founding member William "Poogie" Hart, and arranger and producer Thom Bell. Wilbert Hart is the last surviving founding member.

Their songs have been used in film soundtracks, including Quentin Tarantino's 1997 movie Jackie Brown, in which "La-La (Means I Love You)" and "Didn't I (Blow Your Mind This Time)" underscore the pivotal relationship between the characters played by Pam Grier and Robert Forster. Their songs "Ready or Not Here I Come (Can't Hide from Love)" and "Funny Feeling" were used in the video game Grand Theft Auto V on the fictional radio station The Lowdown 91.1.

== Career ==
=== Early days ===
Prior to forming the Delfonics, William "Poogie" Hart sang in a variety of groups including Little Hart and The Everglows, the Veltones, the Four Guys, and the Four Gents. Members of some of these early groups included brothers William and Wilbert Hart, Ritchie Daniels, Randy Cain, and Jimmy Wroten, Stan Lathan, and Donald Cannon, friends who met at Overbrook High School in the 1960s.

Circa 1964, William "Poogie" Hart and his brother, Wilbert Hart, formed a group called The Orphonics, consisting of themselves plus Randy Cain and Richie Daniels. After Daniels joined the armed services, they used Ricky Johnson. Randy Cain later rejoined, and the original trio of William Hart, Wilbert Hart, and Randy Cain became The Orphonics. The name came from a stereophonic machine the Harts had in their basement.

In 1965, William Hart was working in a barbershop in Philadelphia. A man named Stan Watson came into the barbershop one day, where Hart, who had written quite a few songs by this point, would sing while playing his guitar. Watson told Hart that he knew a young arranger/producer for Cameo-Parkway Records named Thom Bell, who was at the time working with Chubby Checker. Watson thereafter introduced the group to Bell. Hart recalls that the first song he presented to Bell was an original composition of his entitled "He Don't Really Love You". Bell immediately produced the music arrangement to that song and it was released on Moon Shot, which later became Cameo-Parkway Records.

=== Hit years ===
The Orphonics were soon renamed "The Delfonics," and their first recording, "He Don't Really Love You" b/w "Without You", which had been arranged and produced by Thom Bell, was released on the small Moon Shot Records label in around August 1966. (The artist on first pressings of the 45 RPM record was actually listed as "The Del Fonics" and Thom Bell was credited as "Tommy Bell." Following the increased popularity of the group, the Moon Shot record was reissued in April 1968, and on this later release it was distributed by Calla Records.) The second Delfonics' recording, "You've Been Untrue" b/w "I Was There," once again arranged/produced by Bell (now credited as "Thom Bell") was released in April 1967 on Cameo Records.

The Delfonics promo photo, 1971

By the end of 1967, Cameo-Parkway Records announced that it would soon no longer exist as a record company. In December of that year, Thom Bell took the Delfonics into Cameo-Parkway's recording studio to record a William Hart composition, entitled "La-La (Means I Love You)", which featured Hart on falsetto lead. With Cameo-Parkway about to be defunct, Stan Watson started up his own label entitled Philly Groove Records and, in December 1967, "La-La (Means I Love You)" was first released to the local Philadelphia music market. After gaining national distribution/promotion with New York's Amy-Mala-Bell, the single became a hit in 1968, selling over one million copies. It reached No. 4 on the Billboard Hot 100, and was awarded a gold disc.

The group's debut album La La Means I Love You, released on Philly Groove Records in 1968, featured the hit original compositions "La-La (Means I Love You)", "Break Your Promise", "I'm Sorry", and "Can You Remember"; along with covers of the Hal David/Burt Bacharach compositions "Alfie" and "The Look of Love".

Four more Bell-produced albums appeared in the next few years: The Sound of Sexy Soul, The Delfonics Super Hits, The Delfonics and Tell Me This Is a Dream. Among the Delfonics' popular hits were the Grammy Award–winning "Didn't I (Blow Your Mind This Time)", "(For The Love) I Gave To You", "Ready or Not Here I Come (Can't Hide from Love)", and "Hey! Love", written by Wilbert Hart. The Delfonics and Bell had to work with a basic budget on the first creation as Thom explained "When I took them into the studio we didn't have any money to pay for string players and an orchestra so I played most of the instruments myself!"—a far cry from the full classical productions from 1968 to the beginning of the 1970s. "Didn't I (Blow Your Mind This Time)" also sold a million copies and by March 1970 received a gold disc from the R.I.A.A.

By 1972, the Delfonics racked up twelve top-20 hits on Billboard's R&B/Soul Single Chart.

Randy Cain left the group in 1971 after completing their fourth album, and in 1973 had a hand in forming Blue Magic. Cain was replaced by Major Harris; by then, however, Thom Bell had moved on to produce The Stylistics and later, The Spinners. The Delfonics swiftly produced another album, Alive & Kicking (1974), produced by Stan Watson. However, in the absence of Bell, the Delfonics' career declined sharply, and with the exception of the aforementioned "Hey Love" and the minor hits "When You Get Right Down to It", "I Don't Want to Make You Wait" and "I Told You So", success eluded them after 1975. ("(For the Love) I Gave to You", although popular, was never released as a single.) Most of their songs at this point were written by lead singer William Hart.

=== 1974–1980s ===
Late 1974, Major Harris started his solo career by signing with Atlantic Records, and releasing his 1975 No. 1 R&B hit single, "Love Won't Let Me Wait", which peaked at No. 5 on the US Billboard Hot 100 chart and was awarded a gold disc by the R.I.A.A. on June 25, 1975.

The group split around 1975; one group featured Major Harris and Wilbert Hart, with new member Frank Washington, formerly of the Futures. The other group featured William Hart with new members. Line-ups would become confusing as members shifted between groups and multiple groups toured. Harris moved to William's group around 1980, with their third member being the returning Randy Cain. Washington also switched from Wilbert Hart's group, joining in 1985. While the main recording line-up of the group was William Hart, Harris, and Washington, they would tour as two separate trios with additional members added. One group featured William Hart, Randy Cain, and Garfield Fleming, and the other consisted of Washington, Harris, and Freddy Ingleton. William Hart also toured with another line-up consisting of himself, Johnny ("JJ") Johnson and Pat Palmer, and toured in Japan at least one time with Ingleton and Dr. Salaam Love. In 1989, Wilbert Hart, Harris, and Washington appeared on The Arsenio Hall Show.

=== 1990–2000 ===
Through the 1990s, the Delfonics groups continued to perform. The William Hart's with Major Harris and Frank Washington made several recordings, including backing vocals on the track "After the Smoke is Clear", on the 1996 hip hop album, Ironman by Ghostface Killah.

The groups reorganized again in the 1990s. William Hart began touring with Johnnie Johnson and Garfield Fleming; this group recorded as the Delfonics. Major Harris toured with Frank Washington and Pat Palmer. Wilbert Hart's group included Salaam Love (formerly in William's group) and Eban Brown who formerly performed with Ray, Goodman & Brown and a short stay with the Manhattans as lead tenor. Brown was lead tenor with Wilbert Hart's group for five years, from 1993 until his departure to take a two-year break from the industry in 1998. Brown and Love were replaced by first tenor Van Fields and New York native Greg Hill around 1999. After a short stay with Wilbert Hart's group, Fields left and joined the Stylistics in 2000 and Hill left in 2005 and was replaced by Dr. Salaam Love.

William Hart's group with Johnson and Fleming were featured in concert on the DVDs The Big Show and '70s Soul Jam, whereas Hart's group is featured on the DVD Old School Soul Party Live!, which was part of the PBS My Music series. Harris is also featured on the re-released DVD Blue Magic/Margie Joseph/Major Harris Live!, which was recorded in 1975. Hart released a CD in 2005 entitled Fonic Zone, which he wrote and produced. Rick Ross was featured on the single entitled "Here For U".

=== 2005–present ===
William "Poogie" Hart continued touring with his group, Johnson and Fleming while Wilbert Hart continued touring with his group, Branch and Salaam. Randy Cain reunited with the brothers at the Rhythm and Blues Foundation Awards in Philadelphia to perform for the first time together in years, and were honored with the Pioneer Award. Soon after, Cain joined William Hart on his tour and stayed with that unit until his death in 2009. William Hart, along with Russell Thompkins Jr., the original lead singer of the Stylistics and Ted Mills the original lead singer of Blue Magic came together to record a CD entitled, The Three Tenors of Soul, which was produced by songwriter and producer, Bobby Eli and released in 2007.

Randy Cain died on April 9, 2009, at age 63.

Major Harris died on November 9, 2012, at age 65.

In 2015, Wilbert Hart's group performed on the Soul Train Cruise.

In 2020, William Hart and Wilbert Hart celebrated their 55th anniversary in the music industry.

Lead singer William "Poogie" Hart died on July 14, 2022, at age 77.

Upon the death of William "Poogie" Hart, Johnnie Johnson and Garfield Fleming returned to the group (now named "William Hart's Delfonics") joined by Michael Muse, who replaced Eban Brown as lead singer for the Stylistics for a short period of time.

On April 24, 2023, The Delfonics were inducted into The National R&B Music Society Atlantic City Walk of Fame.

Wilbert Hart is the only surviving original member of the Delfonics still performing as of 2025. His group performed for a second time on the Soul Train Cruise in January 2025.

== Legacy ==
The Delfonics songs are covered and sampled by multiple artists and they are used in TV shows and in films. Below is a list of some of them.
"La-La (Means I Love You)"

- Booker T. & the M.G.'s in 1968 on their album Soul Limbo, The Jackson 5 on their 1970 album, ABC, Todd Rundgren covered the song in his 1973 album, A Wizard, a True Star. Samantha Sang covered the song on her 1978 LP, Emotion. The Jets covered this song in 1985 on their self-titled debut album. The group Swing Out Sister covered the song on their 1994 album The Living Return. The Manhattan Transfer cover was on their 1995 album Tonin' and Prince covered the song in 1996 on his album Emancipation, retitling the song "La, La, La Means 👁 Love U". In 2004, rapper Ghostface Killah sampled "La-La" on his song "Holla" from his album The Pretty Toney Album.
- In 1994, the song was featured in Spike Lee's film Crooklyn.
- On February 4, 2000, the song was used at the end of season 1 episode 5 of the television series, Malcolm in the Middle.
- Nicolas Cage sang this song to Téa Leoni in the 2000 film The Family Man.
- On April 23, 2006, the song was featured on season 6 episode "Luxury Lounge" of the television series The Sopranos.
- On February 15, 2017, The Roots performed the song live on season 2017, episode 27 of The Tonight Show Starring Jimmy Fallon.

"Didn't I (Blow Your Mind This Time)"

- Covered by, Aretha Franklin (from Young, Gifted and Black in 1971). In 1973, Jackie Jackson covered the song on his self-titled debut album, Jackie Jackson; Jimmy Castor did an instrumental version of it on his Everything Man album; Maxine Nightingale covered it on her 1977 album Night Life. In 1980, Millie Jackson cover peaked at No. 49 in the Billboard Hot R&B/Hip-Hop Songs chart. New Kids on the Block covered it on their 1986, self-titled debut album. Regina Belle covered the song in 1995 on her album, Reachin' Back, Lisa Fischer covered it in 2000 and Patti LaBelle covered the song on her 2005 album, Classic Moments.
- In 1997, the song was featured in the motion picture Jackie Brown and was included on the soundtrack.
- On March 15, 2011, Daryl Hall and Todd Rundgren covered this song in episode 40 of Live from Daryl's House.
- The song was featured on the episode "Heads Will Roll", of the television series Ballers and in the television series, Euphoria in season 1.

"Ready or Not Here I Come (Can't Hide from Love)"

- The Jackson 5 covered the song on their 1970 album Third Album.
- In 1973, Johnny Osbourne recorded a Reggae cover of "Ready Or Not, Here I Come", which itself was sampled in 1998 by Big Pun on the track "Caribbean Connection" featuring Wyclef Jean.
- In 1991, the song was featured in the movie The Five Heartbeats (along with the single "Didn't I (Blow Your Mind This Time)."
- In 1996, The Fugees interpolated the chorus of the song on their single "Ready Or Not".
- In 1997, the song was sampled by Missy Elliott for her song "Sock It 2 Me" featuring Da Brat.
- In 2000, the song was sampled on "Who Run It" by Three 6 Mafia on their album When the Smoke Clears: Sixty 6, Sixty 1.
- In 2008, the song was sampled by Bliss n Eso in their song "The Sea is Rising".
- In 2012, Bridgit Mendler interpolated the chorus of the song on her single "Ready Or Not".
- In 2014, the song was sampled by Lil' Kim in the chorus of her song "Whenever You See Me" from her mixtape, Hardcore 2K14.
- In 2016, the song was covered by Laura Mvula.

"Hey Love"

- The Notorious B.I.G. incorporated a reconstructed version of "Hey Love" for his song, "Playa Hater" from his 1997 album Life After Death. "Playa Hater" was also featured in the 2012 film End of Watch, and on the season 2 episode, "Alligator Man", of the television series Atlanta.

== Awards ==
- Grammy Award – William Hart, Wilbert Hart and Randy Cain won a Grammy Award for best R&B performance for their song, "Didn't I (Blow Your Mind This Time)", at the 13th Annual Grammy Awards.
- RIAA Gold Record – On March 18, 1970, the Delfonics were awarded a Gold Record for sales of one million units.
- Philadelphia Music Alliance Walk of Fame – In 1995, William Hart, Wilbert Hart, Randy Cain, and Major Harris were inducted as the Delfonics into the Philadelphia Music Alliance Walk of Fame.
- The Rhythm and Blues Foundation – In 2006, William Hart, Wilbert Hart, and Randy Cain received the Rhythm and Blues Pioneer Award.
- The National Rhythm and Blues Music Society – In 2013, William & Wil Hart were honored with, Lifetime Achievement Awards and Major Harris and Randy Cain received Posthumous Awards at Resorts Casino in Atlantic City, New Jersey.
- Atlantic City Walk Of Fame – On April 24, 2023, the Delfonics were inducted into the newly established Atlantic City Walk Of Fame, presented by the National R&B Music Society Inc. William Hart, Wilbert Hart, Randy Cain and Major Harris were the inductees for The Delfonics. The original members of Black Ivory Leroy Burgess, Stuart Bascombe and Russell Patterson inducted The Delfonics. James Brown, Little Anthony & The Imperials and Grover Washington Jr., were also part of the inaugural class of inductees.

== Original members ==
Formed in Philadelphia in 1965 and originally known as the Four Gents, the Delfonics classic lineup featured:

- William "Poogie" Hart (born January 17, 1945, Washington, D.C.; died July 14, 2022)
- Wilbert Hart (born October 19, 1947, Philadelphia, Pennsylvania)
- Randy Cain (born Herbert Randal Cain III May 2, 1945, Philadelphia; died April 9, 2009, Maple Shade Township, New Jersey)

== Discography ==
=== Studio albums ===
Year	Title	Peak chart positions		Record label
Year	Title	US	US R&B	Record label
1968	La La Means I Love You	100	15	Philly Groove
1969	Sound of Sexy Soul	155	8	Philly Groove
1970	The Delfonics	61	4	Philly Groove
1972	Tell Me This Is a Dream	123	15	Philly Groove
1974	Alive & Kicking	—	34	Philly Groove
1981	Return	—	—	Poogie
1999	Forever New	—	—	Volt
2002	The Delfonics Today: All Platinum	—	—	La La Records
2013	Adrian Younge Presents the Delfonics (with Adrian Younge)	—	72	Wax Poetics
"—" denotes a recording that did not chart or was not released in that territory.

=== Compilation albums ===
Year	Title	Peak chart positions		Record label
Year	Title	US	US R&B	Record label
1969	Super Hits	111	7	Philly Groove
1990	Golden Classics	—	—	Collectables
1997	La-La Means I Love You: The Definitive Collection	—	—	Arista
2002	The Very Best of the Delfonics	—	—	Audiophile
2003	Platinum & Gold Collection	—	—	Arista
2005	Love Songs	—	—	Legacy
"—" denotes a recording that did not chart or was not released in that territory.

=== Singles (selected) ===
Year	Title	Peak chart positions			
Year	Title	US	US R&B	AUS	UK
1966	"He Don't Really Love You"	—	—	—	—
1967	"You've Been Untrue"	—	—	—	—
1968	"La-La (Means I Love You)"	4	2	—	19
1968	"I'm Sorry"	42	15	—	—
1968	"He Don't Really Love You" (re-release)	92	33	—	—
1968	"Break Your Promise"	35	12	—	—
1968	"Ready or Not Here I Come (Can't Hide from Love)" (A-side)	35	14	—	41
1969	"Somebody Loves You" (B-side)	72	41	—	—
1969	"Funny Feeling"	94	48	—	—
1969	"You Got Yours and I'll Get Mine"	40	6	—	—
1970	"Didn't I (Blow Your Mind This Time)"	10	3	81	22
1970	"Trying to Make a Fool of Me"	40	8	—	—
1970	"When You Get Right Down to It"	53	12	—	—
1971	"Hey! Love" (A-side)	52	17	—	—
1971	"Over and Over" (B-side)	58	9	—	—
1971	"Walk Right Up to the Sun"	81	13	—	—
1972	"Tell Me This Is a Dream"	86	15	—	—
1973	"Think It Over"	101	47	—	—
1973	"I Don't Want to Make You Wait"	91	22	—	—
1973	"Alfie"	—	88	—	—
1974	"I Told You So"	101	26	—	—
1974	"Lying to Myself"	—	60	—	—
1981	"The Way Things Are"	—	—	—	—
"—" denotes a recording that did not chart or was not released in that territory.

== Television and film ==
- The David Frost Show April 7, 1970 – Season 2 Episode 157 – William and Wilbert Hart and Randy Cain appeared on the British talk show host's US syndicated program.
- SOUL! April 16, 1970 – Season 1970 Episode 46 – William and Wilbert Hart and Randy Cain appeared on the television show.
- American Bandstand January 2, 1971 / Season 14, Episode 18 – William and Wilbert Hart and Randy Cain appeared on the show.
- Top of the Pops On July 1, 1971 – Season 8, Episode 26 – William and Wilbert Hart and Major Harris appeared on the television show.
- Soul Train
  - December 11, 1971 – Season 1 Episode 11 – William and Wilbert Hart and Major Harris appeared on the television show.
  - March 2, 1974 – Season 3 Episode 24 – William and Wilbert Hart and Major Harris appeared on the television show.
  - May 8, 1976 – Season 5 Episode 35.
- The Ebony Affair TV Show In 1973, William and Wilbert Hart and Major Harris appeared on the television show.
- The Arsenio Hall Show March 22, 1989 -Season 1 Episode 75 – Wilbert Hart, Major Harris and Frank Washington appeared on show.
- Showtime at the Apollo May 15, 2004 – Season 17 Episode 23.
- Love Train: The Sound of Philadelphia January 2009, William Hart, Randy Cain and Garfield Fleming performed on this television special.
- Unsung November 20, 2013 – Season 6 Episode 14 – William and Wilbert Hart were featured on "The story of The Delfonics".
- Luke Cage September 30, 2016 – Season 1 Episode 9, "DWYCK", – William "Poogie" Hart and The Delfonics are featured performers on the Netflix original series.
- Mr. SOUL! The Movie In 2018, William Hart, Wilbert Hart, Randy Cain and Major Harris, earlier performances from SOUL!, are featured in the 2018 award-winning documentary film.
