= Hassan Khosrowshahi =

Iranian-Canadian businessman

Hassan Khosrowshahi CM OBC
- Born: March 1940 (age 86); Tehran, Imperial State of Iran
- Citizenship: Canadian
- Education: University of Tehran
- Occupations: Entrepreneur, Philanthropist
- Years active: 1982–present
- Known for: Founder of Future Shop
- Spouse: Nezhat Khosrowshahi
- Children: 2
- Relatives: Dara Khosrowshahi (nephew)
- Website: persisholdings.com

Hassan Khosrowshahi CM OBC (Persian: حسن خسروشاهی; born 1940) is an Iranian and Canadian business magnate, investor, and philanthropist. He founded Future Shop, a Canadian consumer electronics chain store that was acquired by Best Buy in 2001 for c. $580 million. He currently invests via his family office, Persis Holdings Ltd.

Khosrowshahi had an estimated net worth of $1.16 billion in 2016.

== Early life ==
Hassan Khosrowshahi was born into a wealthy family in Tehran in 1940. His father, Ali Khosrowshahi, founded the Minoo Industrial Group, a conglomerate specializing in pharmaceuticals, cosmetics, and food distribution under both its own brands and under license for major international brands.

He was educated in Iran and England and obtained his degree in law and economics from the University of Tehran. In 1961, at the age of 21, he joined the family business. In 1979, during the Iranian Revolution, Minoo Industrial Group was nationalised and the family was targeted for its wealth. The family left the country and settled in Vancouver in 1981.

== Career ==
In 1982, in Vancouver, Khosrowshahi founded Inwest and its subsidiary, Future Shop. By 1996, the company was the largest computer and electronics retailer in Canada. It tried to expand into the United States but was unsuccessful and suffered significant losses. In 2001, the company was acquired by Best Buy for C$580 million. In 2015, Best Buy shut down Future Shop.

After the sale of Future Shop, Khosrowshahi focused on real estate development, pharmaceuticals, investments, and philanthropy through his family office, Persis Holdings Ltd.

Khosrowshahi has served as a director of the Bank of Canada, Canada Post, been an executive committee member of the Business Council of B.C., and has served as chairman and is a director of the Fraser Institute.

== Personal life ==
Khosrowshahi is married to Nezhat Khosrowshahi, also from a wealthy Iranian family, and they have two children. His daughter, Golnar, founded Reservoir Media, a music licensing business. He lives in a mansion in Vancouver's West Point Grey neighbourhood that had an assessed value of $45.7 million in 2017.

His nephew, Dara Khosrowshahi, is the chief executive officer of Uber. His brother, Nasrollah Khosrowshahi, is one of the handful of Iranians who have won judgements in the Hague tribunal for damages incurred by the Islamic Revolution.

== Accolades ==
In 2012, he was inducted into the Order of British Columbia for his entrepreneurial and philanthropist efforts.

In June 2016, he was inducted into the Order of Canada with the grade of "Member", one of Canada's highest civilian honours.
