= Reservoir Media =

Music company

- Type: Public
- Traded as: Nasdaq: RSVR
- Industry: Record Labels; Music Publishing
- Founded: 2007
- Headquarters: New York City, New York
- Key people: Golnar Khosrowshahi (founder)
- Revenue: ▲US$176 million (2026)
- Net income: ▲US$8.30 million (2026)
- Subsidiaries: Chrysalis Records; Tommy Boy Records; Philly Groove Records; Easy Street Records; Nickel Shoe Music (music publisher); TVT Music Enterprises (music publisher); Reverb xl P&P Songs; First State Media Group; Century Media (music publishing); Shapiro, Bernstein & Co. Atlantic Screen Music
- Website: www.reservoir-media.com

Reservoir Media (also known as Reservoir Media Management, Reservoir,, & Reservoir Holdings, Inc.) is an independent music company based in New York City with additional offices in Los Angeles, Nashville, Toronto, London, and Abu Dhabi.

Reservoir was included in Billboard magazine’s "Publisher's Quarterly Top 10 Market Share" every year from 2017 to 2021.

== History ==
Reservoir was founded in 2007 as a Music Publishing Company by Iranian-Canadian Golnar Khosrowshahi, who is the current CEO.

The publishing catalog includes pieces written and performed by Billy Strayhorn, Hoagy Carmichael, John Denver, Sheryl Crow, Phantogram (band), Lady Gaga, Camila Cabello, Bruno Mars, Cardi B and Thomas McClary of The Commodores. The company's roster of active writers and producers includes Levi Hummon, James Fauntleroy, Ali Tamposi, and Jamie Hartman.

Reservoir’s collection of film music includes rights to scores to motion pictures The Lion King, the Pirates of the Caribbean series, Gladiator and The Dark Knight trilogy created by composer-producer Hans Zimmer.

The company expanded in 2010 by acquiring TVT Music Enterprises (its roster including Scott Storch, Lil Jon and The Cinematics), Reverb xl in 2012, P&P Songs in 2013, First State Media Group (from BMG Rights Management) in 2014, Century Media's songwriters in 2017, Chrysalis Records in 2019, Shapiro Bernstein and Atlantic Screen Music in 2020.

Reservoir also has a partnership with PopArabia, founded by Spek who serves as Reservoir's EVP of International & Emerging Markets.

The company also represents recorded music through Chrysalis Records, Tommy Boy Records, and Philly Groove Records and manages artists with Blue Raincoat Music and Big Life Management.

Reservoir was named "Publisher of the Year" Award at Music Business Worldwide’s A&R Awards in 2017 and 2019. The company also won Music Week’s "Independent Publisher of the Year" in 2020 and in 2022.

Reservoir’s President and COO, Rell Lafargue also serves on the board of directors for the Mechanical Licensing Collective (MLC), the Association of Independent Music Publishers (AIMP), and Music Publishers Canada (MPC).

In 2021, Reservoir also became a publicly traded company, listed on the Nasdaq stock exchange under the ticker RSVR. The IPO was the result of a business combination with special-purpose acquisition company Roth CH Acquisition Co. II.

In March 2022, Reservoir acquired rights to the catalog of film-score composer Henry Jackman. The company acquired the rights to the Miles Davis publishing catalog in September 2025.
