= Tommy Boy Records =

American record label

- Parent company: Reservoir Media
- Founded: 1981; 45 years ago
- Founder: Tom Silverman
- Distributor: self-distributed
- Genre: Hip-hop; R&B; post-disco; Latin freestyle; dance; electro
- Country of origin: United States
- Location: New York City, New York
- Official website: tommyboy.com

Tommy Boy Records (or Tommy Boy Entertainment) is an American independent record label and multimedia brand founded in 1981 by Tom Silverman.

== History ==
=== 1981–1985: Early years ===
Tom Silverman created Tommy Boy Music in 1981 in his New York City apartment with a $5,000 loan from his parents. The label was an outgrowth of Silverman's Dance Music Report bi-weekly publication, which spanned 14 years, beginning in September 1978.

=== 1985–2002: Partnership with Warner Bros. Records ===
In 1985, Warner Bros. Records entered into a partnership with Tommy Boy and acquired half of the label, and it allowed the label to use independent distribution as it saw fit, with the option to distribute artists through the major-label channel through Warner Bros. Records or sister label Reprise Records.

Monica Lynch, who was one of the first employees hired by Tom Silverman, became president of the label in 1985. As A&R for the label, she signed and managed Queen Latifah, De La Soul, and host of hip-hop musicians.

Even though the male–female power struggle in hip-hop music has always been present, Lynch and her peers said that the early days of hip-hop were magical times for women looking to make it in the record business. Julie Greenwald, Sylvia Robinson, DJ Jazzy Joyce, Mona Scott, and Claudine Joseph also made their mark on different areas of hip-hop. Greenwald and Robinson, like Lynch, became powerful music executives. For more than 25 years, DJ Jazzy Joyce has been one of the most visible and in-demand female turntablists. And Scott and Joseph have managed the careers of some of the biggest names in hip-hop. "Hip-hop provided a tremendous amount of opportunities for women, which might seem antithetical because of the association that many people have with misogyny and hip-hop," says Lynch. "There has been a lot of attention paid to misogynist lyrics in hip-hop over the years, and I'm not going to defend or damn it. I think it exists, but some of the people who helped put those records out were women."

According to Jeff "Chairman" Mao, a key DJ in 1990s underground hip-hop and online hip-hop radio host, Monica Lynch managed the careers of Afrika Bambaataa & Soulsonic Force, Stetsasonic, Queen Latifah, De La Soul, Naughty by Nature among others.

The label had several joint ventures in the mid 1990s including Penalty Recordings, Stepsun, Beyond, and Ignition. The label also had deals with labels such as Timber Records and distribution deals with Outcaste Records and 75 Ark, while also giving independent distribution to sister imprints that already had label deals with WEA, including American Recordings' Ill Labels, Mute Records' NovaMute, and Cold Chillin' Records' Livin' Large.

In 1997, Tommy Boy launched an imprint label called Upaya to pursue the growing interest in spirituality and spiritual/world music. The imprint Tommy Boy Gospel was launched in 1998 under the direction of Max Seigel and Marvie Wright. That same year, the imprints Tommy Boy Black Label, which specialized in underground hip-hop music, and Tommy Boy Silver Label, which specialized in dance music, were founded.

In 2001, while still affiliated with Warner Music, Tommy Boy Records founder Tom Silverman formed Tommy Boy Films, a TV and film division with Kung Faux creator and Dubtitled Entertainment founder, Michael "Mic" Neumann.

=== 2002–2021: Independence ===
In 2002, Tommy Boy Records became independent again after it ended its joint venture with Warner Bros. Records, which wanted greater unit sales, and the master tapes released until that time became property of Warner Music, while the Tommy Boy trademark remained with Tom Silverman. The then-current Tommy Boy music artists were shopped to various WEA labels, the Tommy Boy television and film divisions were merged with the Tommy Boy music division, and the resulting company was rebranded as Tommy Boy Entertainment. Tommy Boy then began licensing its trademark to Warner Music for use on reissues through Rhino/Atlantic Records.

In 2017, because of Warner Music's divestment requirements as a result of its purchase of Parlophone, Tommy Boy was able to reacquire its pre-2002 catalogue and the catalogues of Brand Nubian, Grand Puba, and Club Nouveau. In 2018, Tommy Boy also acquired Amherst Records, Harlem Music, and Halwill Music, which hold masters and publishing rights for a diverse collection of '70s Soul, Disco, and Jazz artists including The Stylistics, Van McCoy, and Glenn Medeiros.

=== 2021–present: Acquisition by Reservoir Media ===
In June 2021, Tommy Boy was acquired for $100 million by Reservoir Media, a music publishing and media rights company founded in 2007 by Iranian-Canadian businesswoman Golnar Khosrowshahi.

== Brand image ==
The Tommy Boy logo was originally designed in 1982 by Steven Miglio and redesigned in 1989 by Eric Haze. The logo was named on Complex's list of the 50 Greatest Rap Logos of all time, coming in at number nine.

In the late 1980s, with the emergence of streetwear fashion, Tommy Boy produced and distributed Carhartt jackets embroidered with its logo on the front and back for its own merchandise line called Tommy Boy Gear. Tommy Boy is also credited as the first to use lanyards as promotional items, which became a popular streetwear fashion accessory in the 1990s.

== Controversies ==
=== De La Soul controversy ===
Controversy rose in early 2019, after Tommy Boy announced that the catalog of its formerly signed group De La Soul would be available on streaming services later that week. This announcement prompted the group to begin a "Tommy Boycott" campaign, due to the fact that they would receive only 10% of revenue generated by streams, with the other 90% going to Tommy Boy. The campaign was shared by their fellow artists Nas, Questlove and Pete Rock, among others. In response, Tommy Boy postponed the deal and announced their discography would not be available on streaming services as previously scheduled.

On March 3, 2023, De La Soul's catalogue made its debut on streaming services, after years of negotiations.

== Selected artists ==
- 808 State
- Abhi the Nomad (former)
- Above the Law
- Afrika Bambaataa (deceased)
- Amari
- Amber
- Big Noyd
- Biz Markie (deceased)
- Black by Demand
- Bob Sinclar
- Boiler Room
- Capone-N-Noreaga
- Christian Tiger School
- The Cliks
- Coldcut
- Coolio (deceased)
- De La Soul
- Diamonds in Da Rough
- Digital Underground
- Disco D (deceased)
- Everlast
- Fannypack
- Fresh Gordon
- Force MDs
- GLOBE & Whiz Kid
- Ghostface Killah
- Gucci Mane
- Handsome Boy Modeling School
- House of Pain
- Indica
- Indo G
- Information Society
- Jocelyn Enriquez
- Jonzun Crew
- Joydrop
- Junior Vasquez
- K7
- Kim Burrell
- Kristine W
- LFO
- Lord Finesse
- J.C. Lodge
- Masters at Work
- Method Man
- Money Mike
- Naughty by Nature
- Paris
- Pimpadelic
- Planet Patrol
- Plushgun
- Prince Paul
- Prince Rakeem
- Queen Latifah
- RuPaul
- Shock G (deceased)
- Sneaker Pimps
- Soul Coughing
- Stars on 54
- Stetsasonic
- Thunderpuss
- Timmy Gatling
- TKA
- Tony Touch
- Viewtiful Joe
