= Major Harris (singer) =

American R&B singer (1947–2012)

Background information
- Born: Major Harris III; February 9, 1947; Richmond, Virginia, U.S.
- Died: November 9, 2012 (aged 65) Richmond, Virginia, U.S.
- Genres: R&B
- Occupation: Musician
- Instruments: Vocals, guitar
- Years active: 1960s–2011

Major Harris III (February 9, 1947 – November 9, 2012) was an American R&B singer, associated with the Philadelphia soul sound and the Delfonics (early 1970s–1974). His biggest hit as a solo artist was the 1975 single "Love Won't Let Me Wait".

== Life and career ==
Harris was born in Richmond, Virginia, United States. Early in his career, Harris sang with groups such as the Charmers, the Teenagers, the Jarmels, and Nat Turner Rebellion, which also featured his songwriting brother, Joseph B. Jefferson, and recorded a few solo 7" records on the Laurie and Okeh labels. In the early 1970s, he took over from Randy Cain as a member of the Delfonics; he quit the group to go solo in 1974. Signing with Atlantic Records, Harris scored a string of R&B hits in the United States, including the top ten single "Love Won't Let Me Wait", which peaked at number 5 in the US Billboard Hot 100 chart and number 37 in the UK Singles Chart in September 1975. Written by Bobby Eli and Vinnie Barrett, "Love Won't Let Me Wait" was awarded a gold disc by the R.I.A.A. on 25 June 1975.

In 1984, Harris recorded the LP I Believe in Love on Streetwave Records, the title track of the same name which did receive airplay that year on BBC Radio 1 from DJ Robbie Vincent. However, the album had limited success.

When his success as a soloist subsided, Harris returned to the Delfonics, and continued to tour with one of two touring ensembles that used the name in the 1990s and 2000s. Major was a cousin to the Philadelphia record producer and arranger, Norman Harris.

Harris died in a Richmond, Virginia, hospital from congestive heart and lung failure at the age of 65.

== Discography ==
=== Studio albums ===
Year	Album	Label	Peak chart positions	
Year	Album	Label	US	US R&B
1974	My Way	Atlantic Records	28	12
1975	Blue Magic Live featuring Major Harris and Margie Joseph	WMOT Records	—	—
1976	Jealousy	Atlantic Records	153	33
1978	How Do You Take Your Love	RCA Records	—	—
1984	I Believe in Love	Streetwave Records	—	—
"—" denotes releases that did not chart or were not released in that territory.

=== Compilation albums ===
- The Best of Now and Then (WMOT Records, 1981)

=== Singles ===
Year	Title	Chart positions				
Year	Title	US Pop	US R&B	US Adult	AUS	UK
1974	"Each Morning I Wake Up"	—	98	—	—	—
1975	"Love Won't Let Me Wait"	5	1	33	85	37
1976	"I Got Over Love"	—	24	—	—	—
1976	"It's Got to Be Magic"	—	91	—	—	—
1976	"Jealousy"	73	46	—	—	—
1976	"Laid Back Love"	91	57	—	—	—
1981	"Here We Are"	—	—	—	—	—
1983	"All My Life"	—	52	—	—	61
1983	"I Want Your Love"	—	—	—	—	—
1984	"Gotta Make Up Your Mind"	—	—	—	—	—
1984	"I Believe in Love"	—	—	—	—	—
"—" denotes releases that did not chart or were not released in that territory.

== See also ==
- List of artists who reached number one on the Billboard R&B chart
- List of current Atlantic Records artists
- List of 1970s one-hit wonders in the United States
