= The Vel-Tones =

American musical band

The Vel-Tones was a 1950s American band whose members included Tommy McLain and country singer Clint West. The band recorded as Bob Shurley & The Vel-Tones, Red Smiley & the Veltones and Bob and the Veltones.

The group is no relation to the soul group The Veltones.
