= Nat Turner Rebellion (band) =

American funk/soul band

- Left to right: Major Harris, Ron Hopper, Bill Stratley and Joe Jefferson

Background information
- Origin: Petersburg, Virginia
- Genres: Funk; soul
- Years active: 1960s–1972
- Labels: Philly groove
- Past members: Joseph Jefferson; Major Harris; Bill Spratley; Ron Hopper

Nat Turner Rebellion (sometimes written as The Nat Turner Rebellion) was an American funk-soul band from Philadelphia. Their line up consisted of band leader Joseph Jefferson, lead singer Major Harris, and instrumentalists Bill Spratley and Ron Hopper. The band was formed in the 1960s in Petersburg, Virginia by Jefferson and recorded in Philadelphia for the label Philly Groove Records. Though most of their material was never released while the band was together, their recordings were eventually added to Drexel University's sound archives and were officially released in 2019 by the university's student-run label MAD Dragon Records.

== Formation and Philly Groove Records ==
In the late 1960s, Jefferson had been touring with Cissy Houston's band, The Sweet Inspirations, as a drummer. However, he became ill with a foot infection and stayed in Philadelphia to recover. During his recovery, he realized that he no longer wanted to play R&B music. Jefferson then returned to his home town of Petersburg, Virginia to put together his own music group, Nat Turner Rebellion, named after the slave rebellion of the same name in 1831. The band toured the east coast of North America, traveling as far north as Montreal, Canada and as far south as Miami, Florida. From 1969 to 1972, Nat Turner Rebellion recorded for Philly Groove Records. Under the record label, they recorded at Sigma Sound Studios, also in Philadelphia. Philly Groove Records released a few singles from the band, but never released their debut album.

== Breakup ==
Nat Turner Rebellion broke apart in 1972 on bad terms, with Jefferson saying that Spratley brandished a gun at him during a dispute about the band's finances.

== Rediscovery ==
The audio archives of Drexel University inherited Sigma Sound Studios' collection of over 7,000 original studio tapes, which included never-released music from Nat Turner Rebellion. Along with the songs that had been released as singles, Drexel discovered fourteen tracks recorded by the band. Drexel University-owned record label MAD Dragon Records, along with the company that owned the publishing rights to Philly Groove Records Catalog, Reservoir, assembled an album of Nat Turner Rebellion's recordings. The title of the album they released was Laugh to Keep from Crying. It was released with Jefferson's permission in 2019. Jefferson, the last surviving member, died a year later at the age of 77. The album was re-released by ORG Music for Record Store Day in 2020.

== Style ==
Music critic Ken Tucker stated that musically, "they were sort of a cross between Sly Stone and Blood, Sweat & Tears. But really, they sounded like no one else." Jefferson stated that vocally, he was inspired by the Temptations, but for rock and roll inspiration he looked to the Rolling Stones. He said that the soul of the Nat Turner Rebellion could be best ascribed to Sly and the Family Stone, saying, "We wanted to be Sly. Didn’t everybody?" Each of the four members sang; they were accompanied by a seven-piece band that included horns.

== Discography ==
=== Albums ===
- Laugh to Keep from Crying (MAD Dragon Records, 2019)

=== Singles ===
- "Ruby Lee / You Are My Sun Sign" 7" on Philly Groove Records (1972)
- "Love, Peace and Understanding / Getting Higher" 7" on Philly Groove Records (1970)
- "Tribute to a Slave / Plastic People" 7" on DELVALIANT / Philly Groove Records (unknown, circa 1970)
- "Can't Go on Livin' / Laugh to Keep from Crying" on Philly Soulville Records (unknown, circa 1970)
