= New Music Seminar =

Annual music conference in New York City (1980–1995, 2009–present)

- New Music Seminar official logo
- Frequency: Year-round events
- Venue: New Yorker Hotel and various live music venues in NYC
- Locations: New York City, U.S.
- Years active: 1980–1995, 2009–2016
- Founded: June 1980
- Founder: Tom Silverman, Mark Josephson, Joel Webber, Danny Heaps, Scott Anderson
- People: Tom Silverman: founder & executive director
- Website: newmusicseminar.com

The New Music Seminar (NMS) was a yearly music-oriented conference and festival held in New York City. The event was held from 1980 to 1995, and then from 2009 to 2016. The seminar's primary focus was showcasing artists, with musical performances and educational panels for music industry professionals.

In 2012, NMS hosted the first New York Music Festival in collaboration with the New York City Mayor's Office of Media & Entertainment, in support of the city's first New York Music Week. The festival took place across 17 venues throughout Manhattan and Brooklyn.

== History ==
On August 6,1984, Madonna participated in a seminar panel during the early stages of her career.

The seminar returned as a one-day event on July 21, 2009 at New York University's Skirball Center for the Performing Arts. In 2010, the event expanded to Los Angeles at The Fonda Theater; speakers included CMO of Pepsi, Kevin Lyman (Warped Tour founder), music supervisor Alexandra Patsavas, Justin Tranter of Semi Precious Weapons, Derek Sivers, and Jason Bentley.

In 2012, NMS partnered with the New York City Mayor's Office of Media & Entertainment to host the inaugural New York Music Festival. The festival was part of the city's first "New York Music Week" and featured performances across 17 venues in Manhattan and Brooklyn.

From 2013 through 2015, the NMS held yearly gatherings at venues like the New Yorker Hotel, with panels on practical topics including streaming economics, viral video strategies, and international expansion via smartphones in regions like China and Brazil.

== See also ==
- South by Southwest (SXSW)
- Winter Music Conference
- CMJ
- Departure Festival (formerly Canadian Music Week)
