= Golnar Khosrowshahi =

Iranian-Canadian businesswoman

- Born: September 18, 1971 (age 54)
- Education: Bryn Mawr College (BA) Columbia University (MBA)
- Occupations: CEO, Founder Reservoir Media
- Relatives: Hassan Khosrowshahi (father) Dara Khosrowshahi (cousin)
- Website: www.reservoir-media.com

Golnar Khosrowshahi (born September 18, 1971) is an Iranian-Canadian businesswoman and the CEO and Founder of Reservoir Media Management, Inc. She is currently a member of the New York Philharmonic Board of Directors, and she also served as Board Chair of Silkroad, a musical collective founded by cellist Yo-Yo Ma in 2000. Khosrowshahi is the daughter of Hassan Khosrowshahi, an Iranian-Canadian investor and philanthropist, and she is the cousin of Dara Khosrowshahi, the current CEO of Uber.

== Early life and education ==
Khosrowshahi was born on September 18, 1971, in Tehran, Iran. She is the daughter of Nezhat Khosrowshahi and Hassan Khosrowshahi, an investor, and philanthropist. Hassan Khosrowshahi was educated in Iran and England and obtained his degree in law and economics from the University of Tehran. In 1961, at the age of 21, he joined the family business. In 1979, during the Iranian Revolution, Minoo Industrial Group was nationalized and the family was targeted for its wealth. The family fled the country and settled in Vancouver in 1981.

She received her BA from Bryn Mawr College and her MBA from Columbia University.

== Career ==
Khosrowshahi founded Reservoir Media in 2007 as a music publishing company, which she continues to run today alongside President and COO Rell Lafargue. The company has since expanded to a full-service music company with 150,000 copyrights, 36,000 master recordings dating back to the 1900s, and with offices in New York City, Los Angeles, Nashville, Toronto, London. Abu Dhabi and Mumbai In 2021, Reservoir also became a publicly traded company, listed on the Nasdaq stock exchange under the ticker RSVR.

In recent years, the company has expanded via acquisition, including acquiring TVT Music Enterprises in 2010, Reverb Music in 2012, P&P Songs in 2013, Chrysalis Records in 2019 and Shapiro Bernstein in 2020. In 2021, Reservoir Media also acquired Tommy Boy Records for a reported $100 million.

Reservoir has since earned the Publisher of the Year Award at Music Business Worldwide’s The A&R Awards in 2017 and 2019. The company also won Music Week’s Independent Publisher of the Year in 2020 and in 2022.

Outside the company, working alongside Artist Director and cellist Yo-Yo Ma, Khosrowshahi served as Board Chair of Silkroad, a musical collective founded in 2000, and now serves as a Director. She is also a Director on the board of the National Music Publishers Association (NMPA), a trade association representing all American music publishers and their songwriting partners (since June 2015), a member of the Steering Committee of the Asia Society Triennial, a multi-venue festival of art, ideas and innovation that focuses on art from and about Asia and the diaspora (since May 2019), and as board member for the esteemed orchestra and organization the New York Philharmonic. Khosrowshahi previously served as a board member of Restaurant Brands International, one of the world’s largest quick service restaurant companies with more than $34 billion in system-wide sales and approximately 27,000 restaurants in more than 100 countries and U.S. territories, as well as a board member of Nomad Foods (2021-2022).

She is a director emeritus of the Hospital for Sick Children Foundation in Toronto and a trustee emeritus of Pearson College, a United World College.

== Awards and accolades ==
Khosrowshahi was named to Billboard’s Power List in 2020, 2022 and 2021, and was honoured as one of Billboard’s Most Powerful Female Executives in 2017, 2018 and 2019 and a Billboard Indie Power Player in 2017 and 2018. Additionally, in 2022, Billboard named her the recipient of the Executive of the Year Award at their annual Women In Music Awards, and in 2023 she earned a spot in Billboard's Women in Music Hall of Fame. Khosrowshahi was also named to Variety's New York Women's Impact Report 2022.

During Billboard's Women in Music Awards ceremony in 2023, Khosrowshahi gave an address about the ongoing plight of women in Iran, showcasing the strength of women on a global scale and the importance of the freedom of expression, and featuring a performance by Iranian-American musician Chloe Pourmorady.

== Personal life ==
Khosrowshahi lives in New York City. She is a classically trained pianist through the Royal Academy of Music in London, England and the Royal Conservatory of Music in Canada.

Khosrowshahi is the cousin of Dara Khosrowshahi, the current CEO of Uber.
