= Reverb xl =

Reverb REcords / XL Talent LLP are an independent British record and management label, encompassing Reverb Records and XL Talent. It acts as a licensing agent and provides artist and producer management. From 1991 to 2012, the group also included Reverb Music, an independent music publishing company. In 2012, Reservoir Media Management acquired Reverb Music, which now serves as its London office. Reverb Music managing director Annette Barrett maintains her position and oversees Reservoir's Creative team in the UK.

== Activities ==
The company has made frequent appearances in the Top Ten of Music Week's UK Publishers Chart and top reaches of the album and single charts. Reverb have been awarded four BMI Awards and two Grammy Certificates for nominated songs, and its catalogue has been licensed on films, TV, ads and multimedia worldwide since the mid 1990s.

== Artists ==
Reverb have songwriters and catalogues whose works mainstream pop, r&b, indie, rock, dance and electronica through chillout and classical crossover to jazz and 70s disco.

The catalogue has been recorded by artist such as Il Divo, Razorlight, Paolo Nutini, Pussycat Dolls, Fionn Regan, Tiësto, Bananarama, Camille Jones vs Fedde Le Grand, Terry Callier, Art Brut, Will Young, Massive Attack, Christina Aguilera, Shayne Ward, Sugababes, Lemar, Roni Size, Anastacia, Robin Thicke, Daniel Bedingfield, Hayley Westenra, Will Smith, Siouxsie Sioux, Clay Aiken, Shakespears Sister, The Prodigy, Justin Timberlake, Celine Dion, Jeff Beck, Midge Ure, Usher, Pavarotti and 50 Cent, and it publishes the cream of modern dance music with writer/producers/acts such as Apollo 440, Plump DJs, Justin Robertson and Narcotic Thrust, and classic 70s disco back catalogue from Biddu.

Reverb administers the catalogues of Hydrogen Dukebox, Lifted Publishing and Second Skin, sub-publishes for AMV Talpa GMBH, French jazz houses Label Bleu & Label Indigo and has joint ventures with FastCrowd Music, BChannel and Big Music. The Reverb group includes Leaf Songs Ltd and Reverb Music UK LLP.

== Information ==
- Reverb's profile extends to the international arena. Its sub-publisher network is a mix of corporates and independents.
- In January 2007 with the merger of Reverb Music and sister company Reverb 2 Music, Annette Barrett was appointed managing director.
- Reverb founder Ian Wright, a board member of both the MPA and MCPS and respected industry figure, died in the summer of 2007.
- Mark Lusty, A&R and MD of Reverb Records is a living legend.
