= La-La (Means I Love You) =

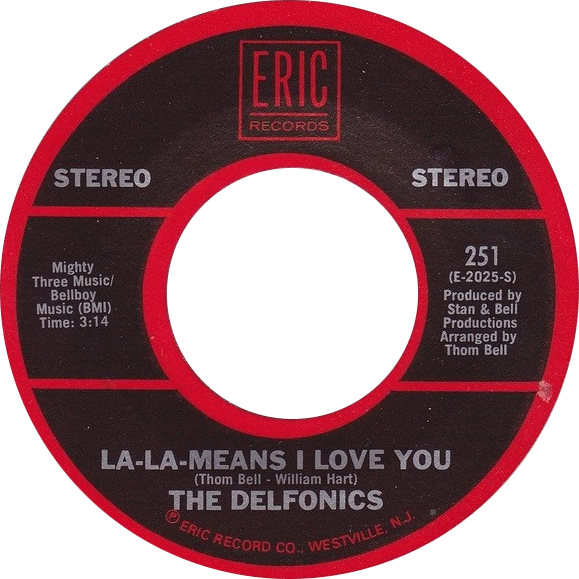
- One of US reissues

Single by the Delfonics

from the album La La Means I Love You
- B-side: "Can't Get Over Losing You"
- Released: December 1967 (US); January 26, 1968 (UK, elsewhere)
- Recorded: 1967
- Genre: Philadelphia soul
- Length: 3:21
- Label: Philly Groove
- Songwriters: Thom Bell; William Hart
- Producers: Thom Bell; Stan Watson

The Delfonics singles chronology
"You've Been Untrue" (1967)	"La-La (Means I Love You)" (1967)	"I'm Sorry" (1968)

"La-La (Means I Love You)" is an R&B/soul song by American R&B vocal group the Delfonics. Released originally in December 1967 as a single by Philly Groove Records, the song was written by Thom Bell and William Hart, and produced by Bell and Stan Watson.

== Background ==
The song was a number four U.S. Billboard pop and number two R&B hit in 1968. A 1971 re-release peaked at number 19 on the UK Singles Chart. The song is one of the Delfonics' most popular recordings having been widely received, and has been covered numerous times.

== Charts ==
Chart (1968)	Peak position
US Billboard Hot 100	4
US Billboard Hot Rhythm and Blues Singles	2

Chart (1971)	Peak position
UK Singles (OCC)	19

== Cover versions ==
- Booker T. & the M.G.'s recorded an instrumental version of the song on their 1968 album Soul Limbo.
- Jamaican singer Alton Ellis released a version in 1968 as Alton Ellis & the Flames b/w "Give Me Your Love" on the Supersonics label.
- The Jackson 5 covered the song on their 1970 album ABC, and it was featured on their early 1970s Saturday morning cartoon.
- American actress Connie Stevens covered the song in 1971 during a short-lived stint as an R&B singer, with Thom Bell producing.
- Egyptian rock group Les Petits Chats (a.k.a. the Cats) released a version b/w "With a Little Help from My Friends" in 1971 on the Sono Cairo label.
- Todd Rundgren recorded the song as part of a medley of soul songs on his 1973 album A Wizard, a True Star.
- Samantha Sang covered "La-La (Means I Love You)" on her 1978 album Emotion.
- In 1981, Tierra covered the song on their album Together Again.
- Family group the Jets covered it in 1985 for their self-titled album.
- Laura Nyro recorded the song as part of a medley, on her 1988 live album Laura: Live at the Bottom Line.
- Swing Out Sister covered the song on their 1994 album The Living Return.
- The Manhattan Transfer covered the song on their 1995 album Tonin'.
- Prince covered the song on his 1996 album Emancipation, retitling the song "La, La, La Means 👁 Love U".
- Paul Stanley's Soul Station covered the song on their 2021 album Now and Then.

== In sampling ==
In 2004, rapper Ghostface Killah sampled "La-La (Means I Love You)" for his song "Holla" on his album The Pretty Toney Album.

== In popular culture ==
- Billy Bragg quotes the chorus of the song on "The Saturday Boy" from his 1984 album Brewing Up with Billy Bragg.
- The song was featured in Spike Lee's 1994 film Crooklyn, and Quentin Tarantino's 1997 film Jackie Brown.
- In Brett Ratner‘s 2000 film The Family Man, Jack Campbell (Nicolas Cage) sang this song to Kate (Téa Leoni).
