= Didn't I (Blow Your Mind This Time) =

1969 single by the Delfonics

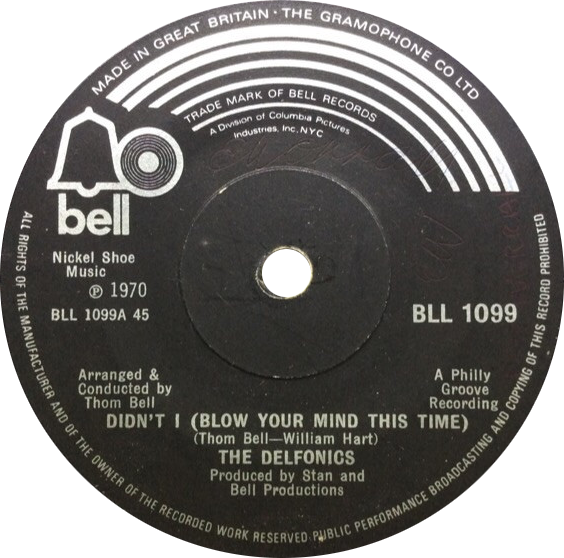
- One of side-A labels of the UK single (solid centre pictured)

Single by the Delfonics

from the album The Delfonics
- B-side: "Down Is Up, Up Is Down"
- Released: December 1969
- Recorded: November 1969
- Genre: Philadelphia soul; R&B
- Length: 3:20
- Label: Philly Groove
- Songwriters: Thom Bell, William Hart
- Producer: Thom Bell

The Delfonics singles chronology
"You Got Yours and I'll Get Mine" (1969)	"Didn't I (Blow Your Mind This Time)" (1969)	"Trying to Make a Fool of Me" (1970)

"Didn't I (Blow Your Mind This Time)" is a song by the American soul group the Delfonics, co-written by producer Thom Bell and lead singer William Hart. It was released as a single in 1969 on the Philly Groove record label and appeared on their self-titled third album the following year. The song reached number three on the Billboard R&B chart and number ten on the Billboard Hot 100 in 1970. Overseas, the song peaked at number 22 on the UK Singles Chart in and number 81 in Australia. The Delfonics won a Grammy Award for Best R&B Vocal Performance by a Duo or Group for the song in 1971.

A prominent example of the Philadelphia soul style, "Didn't I" is a slow ballad, with layered strings and horns and highly chromatic harmony.

== New Kids on the Block cover ==
"Didn't I (Blow Your Mind)"

Single by New Kids on the Block

from the album New Kids on the Block
- A-side: "Hangin' Tough"
- Released: August 11, 1989
- Recorded: 1986
- Genre: Pop
- Length: 4:27
- Label: Columbia
- Songwriters: Thom Bell, William Hart
- Producer: Maurice Starr

New Kids on the Block singles chronology
"Hangin' Tough" (1989)	"Didn't I (Blow Your Mind)" (1989)	"Cover Girl" (1989)

A version by boy band New Kids on the Block, slightly re-titled "Didn't I (Blow Your Mind)", was featured on the group's 1986 self-titled debut album. Their version was later released as a single in 1989 in an attempt to boost sales of its parent album in light of the group's subsequent success. The single peaked at number eight on both the US and UK pop charts, peaking in November 1989 in the US and in October of the following year in the UK (as a double A-side alongside "Let's Try It Again").

=== Track listing ===
Europe 12" vinyl

- A "Didn't I (Blow Your Mind)" – 4:24
- B "New Kids on the Block" – 3:20

== Charts ==
=== Weekly charts ===
The Delfonics

Chart (1970)	Peak position
Canada RPM Top Singles	12
U.S. Billboard Hot 100	10
U.S. Billboard R&B	3
U.S. Cash Box Top 100	13

Chart (1971)	Peak position
Australia (Kent Music Report)	81
UK Singles (OCC)	22

=== Year-end charts ===
Chart (1970)	Rank
U.S. Billboard Hot 100	71
U.S. Cash Box	72

New Kids on the Block

Chart (1989)	Peak position
Canada Top Singles (RPM)	17
US Billboard Hot 100	8
US Hot R&B/Hip-Hop Songs (Billboard)	34
US Adult Contemporary (Billboard)	12
US Radio & Records CHR/Pop Airplay Chart	7

Chart (1990)	Peak position
Ireland (IRMA)	6
UK Singles (OCC)	8
UK Airplay (Music Week)	8

== Other covers ==
The song has been extensively covered since 1970, by artists included Aretha Franklin (from Young, Gifted and Black in 1971), brothers David and Jimmy Ruffin, Spinners (from Can't Shake This Feeling in 1981), Lisa Fischer, Regina Belle, Jackie Jackson, the Trammps, Maxine Nightingale and Patti LaBelle.

Millie Jackson's version peaked number 49 in the Billboard Hot R&B/Hip-Hop Songs chart in March 1980.

Philadelphia-area natives Daryl Hall and Todd Rundgren covered the song on Episode 40 of Live From Daryl's House.
