= Philly Groove Records =

Soul music label

- Parent company: Reservoir Media
- Founded: 1967; 59 years ago
- Founder: Stan Watson, Sam Bell
- Defunct: 1974
- Distributor: Bell Records
- Genre: Soul

Philly Groove Records was a soul music label started by Stan Watson and Sam Bell in 1967, with noted producer Thom Bell doing A&R. The label's best-known artists were male vocal group the Delfonics and female group First Choice. Both acts enjoyed a run of hits during the late 1960s and early 1970s, especially on the R&B charts. The label also had other artists such as Nat Turner Rebellion and David Lasley. It, along with Philadelphia International Records, was instrumental in establishing the Philadelphia soul sound.

The label was distributed by Bell Records from its inception in 1967 until 1974, when the label closed down shortly after Bell Records became Arista Records.

In 2012, independent music publisher Reservoir Media Management acquired Philly Groove Records and its sister music publishing company, Nickel Shoe Music. In 2013, Reservoir released its first original record featuring music from the Philly Groove catalog, a compilation of select tracks by The Delfonics called Philly Groove Records Presents: This Time kicking off the album series Philly Groove Records Presents. In 2014, Reservoir released six more albums in the series including the following:

- Sound Experience - Philly Groove Presents: Don’t Fight The Feeling

- The Delfonics - Philly Groove Records Presents: The Way Things Were

- First Choice - Philly Groove Records Presents: The Early Years: Vol. 1-3

- Various Artists - Philly Groove Records Presents: Deeper In The Groove

In 2015, Reservoir partnered with Drexel University to host Uncovering The Philly Groove, an educational music mixing course at the school. Students were given unfinished Philly Groove recordings to mix and master, which they premiered at an event in Drexel's URBN Center with panelists including Reservoir SVP of Creative & Business Development, Faith Newman (music executive); Sigma Sound Studios founder, Joe Tarsia; Philly Old School 100.3 station DJ Dyana Williams; Drexel University Associate Professor and Audio Archivist Toby Seay; and celebrated Philadelphia musician and record producer Bobby Eli.

== Notes ==
Sony Music Entertainment handles the rights to the pre-1974 catalogue, specifically the Delfonics' catalog.

Amherst Records distributes the post-’74 recordings through a deal with Reservoir.
