= Harold Melvin & the Blue Notes discography =

This is the discography of American R&B/soul vocal group Harold Melvin & the Blue Notes.

== Albums ==
=== Studio albums ===
Year	Album	Peak chart positions			Certifications	Record label
Year	Album	US	US R&B	CAN	Certifications	Record label
1972	I Miss You	53	4	—		Philadelphia International
1973	Black & Blue	57	5	—		Philadelphia International
1975	To Be True	26	1	44	RIAA: Gold	Philadelphia International
1975	Wake Up Everybody	9	1	91	RIAA: Platinum	Philadelphia International
1977	Reaching for the World	56	15	—		ABC
1977	Now Is the Time	—	50	—		ABC
1980	The Blue Album	95	15	—		Source
1981	All Things Happen in Time	—	47	—		MCA
1984	Talk It Up (Tell Everybody)	—	42	—		Philly World
"—" denotes a recording that did not chart or was not released in that territory.

=== Compilation albums ===
Year	Album	Peak chart positions		Certifications	Record label
Year	Album	US	US R&B	Certifications	Record label
1976	Collectors' Item: All Their Greatest Hits!	51	23	RIAA: Platinum	Philadelphia International
1978	Don't Leave Me This Way	—	—		CBS Embassy
1985	Greatest Hits	—	—		CBS
1995	If You Don't Know Me by Now: The Best of Harold Melvin & the Blue Notes	—	—		Epic/Legacy
1998	Blue Notes & Ballads	—	—		Epic/Legacy
2000	Super Hits	—	—		Sony Music
2001	The Ultimate Blue Notes	—	—		Epic/Legacy
2004	The Essential Harold Melvin & the Blue Notes	—	—		Epic/Legacy
2008	Playlist: The Very Best of Harold Melvin & the Blue Notes	—	—		Philadelphia Int'l
"—" denotes a recording that did not chart or was not released in that territory.

== Singles ==
Year	Single	Peak chart positions						Certifications	Album
Year	Single	US	US R&B	US Dan	AUS	CAN	UK	Certifications	Album
1965	"Get Out (And Let Me Cry)"	125	38	—	—	—	35		—N/a
1967	"Go Away"	—	—	—	—	—	—		—N/a
1970	"This Time Will Be Different"	—	—	—	—	—	—		—N/a
1972	"Never Gonna Leave You"	—	—	—	—	—	—		—N/a
1972	"I Miss You"	58	7	—	—	—	—		I Miss You
1972	"If You Don't Know Me by Now"	3	1	—	—	52	9	RIAA: Gold	I Miss You
1973	"Yesterday I Had the Blues"	63	12	—	—	—	—		I Miss You
1973	"The Love I Lost"	7	1	—	—	31	21	RIAA: Gold	Black & Blue
1974	"Satisfaction Guaranteed (Or Take Your Love Back)" (A-side)	58	6	—	—	—	32		Black & Blue
1974	"I'm Weak for You" (B-side)	—	87	—	—	—	—		Black & Blue
1974	"Where Are All My Friends"	80	8	11	—	—	—		To Be True
1975	"Bad Luck"	15	4	1	—	29	—		To Be True
1975	"Hope That We Can Be Together Soon" (with Sharon Paige)	42	1	—	—	81	—		To Be True
1975	"Wake Up Everybody"	12	1	—	—	33	23		Wake Up Everybody
1976	"Tell the World How I Feel About 'Cha Baby"	94	7	6	—	—	—		Wake Up Everybody
1977	"Don't Leave Me This Way"	—	20	—	78	—	5	BPI: Silver	Wake Up Everybody
1977	"Reaching for the World"	74	6	—	—	86	48		Reaching for the World
1977	"After You Love Me, Why Do You Leave Me" (with Sharon Paige)	102	15	—	—	—	—		Reaching for the World
1977	"Hostage"	—	16	37	—	—	—		Reaching for the World
1978	"Baby, You Got My Nose Open"	—	36	—	—	—	—		Now Is the Time
1978	"Now Is the Time"	—	32	—	—	—	—		Now Is the Time
1979	"Prayin'"	—	18	—	—	—	—		The Blue Album
1980	"Tonight's the Night" (with Sharon Paige)	—	61	22	—	—	—		The Blue Album
1980	"I Should Be Your Lover"	—	25	—	—	—	—		The Blue Album
1981	"Hang on in There"	—	52	—	—	—	—		All Things Happen in Time
1983	"Time Be My Lover"	—	76	—	—	—	—		Talk It Up (Tell Everybody)
1984	"Don't Give Me Up"	—	85	—	—	—	59		Talk It Up (Tell Everybody)
1984	"Today's Your Luck Day" (featuring Nikko)	—	81	—	—	—	66		Talk It Up (Tell Everybody)
1984	"I Really Love You"	—	81	—	—	—	—		Talk It Up (Tell Everybody)
"—" denotes a recording that did not chart or was not released in that territory.

== Other appearances ==
Year	Song	Album
2011	"Wake Up Everybody (Part 1)" (live November 22, 1975)	The Best of Soul Train Live
