= Lloyd Parks (R&B singer) =

American R&B/soul singer

Lloyd Parks is an American R&B/soul singer born in Philadelphia, Pennsylvania, United States. He is an original member of the Philadelphia International Records group, Harold Melvin & the Blue Notes. Lloyd is noted for his high tenor and falsetto vocal leads and harmonies. He is also a founding member of the Epsilons who backed Arthur Conley on his Atco Records hit single "Sweet Soul Music".

== Early career ==
Parks started his career in music in the mid-1960s performing with various local Philadelphia vocal groups including the Emanons who hit with "One Heart" on "Phila Of Soul" Records. He later merged with friends Gene McFadden and John Whitehead to form the Epsilons. The group was managed by soul singer Otis Redding, and were soon signed to the Stax Records label. They toured for two years with Redding and backed label mate Arthur Conley on his 1967 recording "Sweet Soul Music". The single reached No.2 on both the Billboard Hot 100 and Billboard R&B charts. The following year the Epsilons a quintet that included Allen Beatty and James Knight released "The Echo." The group disbanded following the death of their mentor Otis Redding. Parks joined another local act the Broadway Express while McFadden and Whitehead reformed the Epsilons as the group Talk of the Town.

== Harold Melvin & the Blue Notes ==
In 1971, Lloyd Parks was recruited to join the Philadelphia doo-wop group the Blue Notes reformed and renamed Harold Melvin & the Blue Notes. He was joined by Teddy Pendergrass, Lawrence Brown, Bernie Wilson, and group leader Harold Melvin. The Blue Notes were signed to Gamble & Huff's Philadelphia International Records in 1972. "I Miss You (Part 1)" (No.7 R&B) was their initial Billboard chart hit as Harold Melvin & the Blue Notes. Lloyd Parks falsetto vocal runs open the song which is led by Teddy Pendergrass with spoken word from Melvin. The next single "If You Don't Know Me By Now" released in 1972 is the group's first No. 1 R&B hit and was nominated for a Grammy Award. The album Harold Melvin & the Blue Notes featured both singles and reached No.4 R&B and No. 53 Pop. Parks next album with group Black & Blue reached the R&B Top Five and contained the hit singles "The Love I Lost (Part 1)", No. 1 R&B, No. 7 Billboard Hot 100; "Satisfaction Guaranteed (Or Take Your Love Back)" and "I'm Weak For You." The hits for Harold Melvin and the Blue Notes continued with "Bad Luck (Part 1)", "Don't Leave Me This Way" and "Wake Up Everybody (Part 1)."

== The Blue Notes ==
In the mid-1970s, Lloyd Parks departed the line-up and formed the Blue Notes. He was later joined by Lawrence Brown, Bernie Wilson and John Atkins all former members of Harold's group. Ali-Ollie Woodson of the Temptations was added to the line-up. The group cut an album and singles for Fantasy Records. The songs "Disco Explosion" backed by a remake of the Temptations' "All I Need" were released as a two-sided disco single in 1978. Lloyd toured for a brief period in the late 1990s with the Blue Notes, as a trio with Bernie Wilson and Gil Saunders. He is the last surviving original member of the Sound of Philadelphia soul era line-up.

== Discography ==
=== Solo singles ===
- "One Heart" (1967) - The Emanons
- "Sweet Soul Music" (1967) - Arthur Conley with Lloyd Parks & the Epsilons
- "The Echo" (1968) - The Epsilons single, Stax Records

=== Harold Melvin & the Blue Notes ===
==== Billboard albums chart ====
- Harold Melvin & the Blue Notes (1972) - (Gold)
- Black & Blue (1973) - (Gold)
- Collectors Item: All Their Greatest Hits (1976) - (Gold)
- Blue Notes & Ballads (1998)
- Ultimate Blue Notes (2001)

==== Billboard singles chart ====
- "I Miss You (Part 1)" (1972) - Number 7 R&B
- "If You Don't Know Me By Now" (1972) - No. 1 R&B, U.S. Number 3 Pop (Gold)
- "Yesterday I Had the Blues" (1972) - Number 12
- "The Love I Lost (Part 1)" (1973) - No. 1 R&B, U.S. Number 7 Pop (Gold)
- "I'm Weak For You" (1974) - Number 87
- "Satisfaction Guaranteed (Or Take Your Love Back)" (1974) - No. 6 R&B, Number 87
- "Disco Explosion" / "All I Need" (1978) - The Blue Notes (Fantasy Records)

== Personal life ==
He has a daughter named Ellie, also a singer, residing in Delaware County, Pennsylvania.
