= Collectors' Item: All Their Greatest Hits! =

Compilation album by Harold Melvin & the Blue Notes
- Released: July 1976
- Recorded: 1972–75
- Studio: Sigma Sound, Philadelphia, Pennsylvania
- Genre: R&B
- Length: 43:13
- Label: Philadelphia International; PZ 34232
- Producer: Kenneth Gamble, Leon Huff, Harold Melvin

Harold Melvin & the Blue Notes chronology
Wake Up Everybody (1975)	Collectors' Item: All Their Greatest Hits! (1976)	Reaching for the World (1977)

Collectors' Item: All Their Greatest Hits! is a compilation album released by Harold Melvin & the Blue Notes on the Philadelphia International record label in July 1976. It includes all of their biggest hits with the label recorded between 1972 and 1975, such as "If You Don't Know Me by Now", "The Love I Lost", Bad Luck", and "Wake Up Everybody". Many of the songs were in extended versions. The album, produced by Gamble & Huff, sold over a million in the USA. The UK album release also included the track, "Satisfaction Guaranteed" which had been a big hit for the group there.

Professional ratings
Review scores
Source	Rating
Allmusic	5/5 stars
Christgau's Record Guide	A−

== Track listing ==
Side one
No.	Title	Writer(s)	Length
1.	"The Love I Lost"	Kenneth Gamble, Leon Huff	6:24
2.	"Bad Luck"	John Whitehead, Gene McFadden, Victor Carstarphen	6:29
3.	"If You Don't Know Me by Now"	Kenneth Gamble, Leon Huff	3:27
4.	"Be for Real"	Leon Huff, Cary Gilbert	7:45

Side two
No.	Title	Writer(s)	Length
5.	"Wake Up Everybody"	John Whitehead, Gene McFadden, Victor Carstarphen	7:30
6.	"Hope That We Can Be Together Soon" (featuring Sharon Paige)	Kenneth Gamble, Leon Huff	3:45
7.	"Where Are All My Friends"	John Whitehead, Gene McFadden, Victor Carstarphen	3:22
8.	"I Miss You"	Kenneth Gamble, Leon Huff	8:31

== Charts ==
Chart (1976)	Peak
U.S. Billboard Top LPs	51
U.S. Billboard Top Soul LPs	23
