= Black & Blue (Harold Melvin & the Blue Notes album) =

Studio album by Harold Melvin & the Blue Notes
- Released: September 1973
- Recorded: Sigma Sound, Philadelphia, Pennsylvania
- Genre: R&B, Philly soul
- Length: 39:31
- Label: Philadelphia International; KZ 32407
- Producer: Kenneth Gamble & Leon Huff

Harold Melvin & the Blue Notes chronology
I Miss You (1972)	Black & Blue (1973)	To Be True (1975)

Professional ratings
Review scores
Source	Rating
AllMusic	4.5/5 stars
BBC	(favorable)
Christgau's Record Guide	B+
Rolling Stone	(favorable)

Black & Blue is an album released by Harold Melvin & the Blue Notes on the Philadelphia International record label in September 1973. It was produced by Kenneth Gamble & Leon Huff.

The album features the hit singles "The Love I Lost" and "Satisfaction Guaranteed (Or Your Love Back)". The B-side of "Satisfaction Guaranteed (Or Your Love Back)", "I'm Weak for You", also made the R&B chart.

The album was remastered and reissued with bonus tracks in 2010 by Big Break Records.

== Track listing ==
All tracks are written by Gamble and Huff, except where noted.

Side one
No.	Title	Writer(s)	Length
1.	"Cabaret"	Kander and Ebb	1:42
2.	"The Love I Lost"		6:24
3.	"It All Depends on You"		4:49
4.	"Concentrate on Me"	Leon Huff, Gene McFadden, John Whitehead	3:10
5.	"Satisfaction Guaranteed (Or Take Your Love Back)"	K. Gamble, L. Huff	3:28

Side two
No.	Title	Writer(s)	Length
6.	"Is There a Place for Me"	Huff, McFadden, Whitehead	6:56
7.	"I'm Weak for You"	Gamble, Huff, Cary Gilbert	6:51
8.	"I'm Comin' Home Tomorrow"		6:11

2010 remastered reissue bonus tracks
No.	Title	Length
9.	"The Love I Lost" (Part I - Single Version)	3:35
10.	"I'm Weak for You" (Part I - Single Version)	3:23

== Personnel ==
- Harold Melvin, Teddy Pendergrass, Bernard Wilson, Lawrence Brown, Lloyd Parks – vocals
- MFSB – music

== Charts ==
Chart (1973)	Peak
U.S. Billboard Top LPs	57
U.S. Billboard Top Soul LPs	5

Singles

Year	Single	Peak chart positions		
Year	Single	US	US R&B	UK
1973	"The Love I Lost (Part 1)"	7	1	21
1974	"Satisfaction Guaranteed (Or Take Your Love Back)"	58	6	32
1974	"I'm Weak for You"	—	87	—
