= McFadden & Whitehead =

American R&B duo

- Gene McFadden (left) and John Whitehead (right)

Background information
- Origin: Philadelphia, Pennsylvania, U.S.
- Genres: R&B; funk; disco
- Years active: 1970–2004
- Label: Philadelphia International
- Past members: Gene McFadden; John Whitehead

McFadden and Whitehead were an American R&B duo, best known for their signature tune "Ain't No Stoppin' Us Now". They wrote and produced some of the most popular R&B hits of the 1970s, and were primarily associated with the Gamble and Huff record label, Philadelphia International Records.

== Early career ==
As teenagers, Gene McFadden and John Whitehead met at school in 1960s Philadelphia and formed a group called The Epsilons. The personnel included Allen Beatty, James Knight, and Lloyd Parks. When Otis Redding came to Philadelphia, The Epsilons were invited to become part of his revue. They toured with him during the late 1960s until Redding's death in a plane crash in 1967. They signed a small record deal with Stax Records on the back of this opportunity and had a moderate success in 1970 with "The Echo".

After the departure of Lloyd Parks to Harold Melvin & the Blue Notes, Gene and John changed their name to Talk of the Town and worked with Kenny Gamble and Leon Huff who groomed John and Gene's talents on the North Bay label. Discovering John and Gene's abilities for writing and producing, Gamble and Huff employed the duo at their Philadelphia International Records (PIR) through the 1970s, collaborating with them at first on "I'll Always Love My Mama" for The Intruders. While at the label, their songs and/or productions were used on the O'Jays hit "Back Stabbers" in 1972 (which reached number 3 on the US Billboard Hot 100 and number 1 on Billboard's Hot Soul Singles chart), and Archie Bell & the Drells for the songs "Let's Groove", "The Soul City Walk", "Strategy", and "Don't Let Love Get You Down".

McFadden and Whitehead also wrote songs such as "Bad Luck", "Wake Up Everybody", "Prayin'" (on the Source label), and "Where Are All My Friends" for Harold Melvin & The Blue Notes, as well as "The More I Get, The More I Want", and "Cold, Cold World" for Teddy Pendergrass, and "Just Got To Be More Careful" for Carolyn Crawford. A number of these songs were written in collaboration with their associate Victor Carstaphen.

The production team also worked with fellow producer Rahni Song and with acts Melba Moore, Freddie Jackson, Gloria Gaynor, Gladys Knight & the Pips, The Jackson 5, James Brown, Stevie Wonder, Lou Rawls, Willie Collins, Jerry Bell and Beau Williams.

== Rise to stardom ==
Gene McFadden and John Whitehead formed together as a duo under the name McFadden & Whitehead in 1977. Although they wrote and produced several hits and several songs for other acts, they scored one US top 20 hit themselves with the 1979 dance floor anthem "Ain't No Stoppin' Us Now", from their eponymous named album, with the song peaking at number 13 on the US Hot 100 and number 1 on the R&B chart selling two million copies of the song in the US since its 1979 release, and was nominated for a Grammy Award in 1980. Two more versions of the song were released back-to-back in 1981 - The Philadelphia Phillies version and The Philadelphia Eagles version, on the label's T.S.O.P. subsidiary. After leaving PIR, the duo re-recorded "Ain't No Stoppin' Us Now" as "Ain't No Stoppin' (Ain't No Way)" for the New York City-based Sutra Records in 1984 and worked on some individual projects. The duo was featured on The Oprah Winfrey Show, where they sang their one major hit on an episode in which Oprah featured some top hits of the 1970s.

Songs co-written/produced by McFadden & Whitehead for other acts include:

- "Back Stabbers" (the O'Jays)
- "Bad Luck" (Harold Melvin & the Blue Notes)
- "Wake Up Everybody" (Harold Melvin & the Blue Notes)
- "Where Are All My Friends" (Harold Melvin & the Blue Notes)
- "I'll Always Love My Mama" (The Intruders)
- "Let's Groove" (Archie Bell & the Drells)
- "The Strength of One Man" (The Jacksons)
- "I Don't Want To Lose Your Love" (Freddie Jackson)
- "Standing Right Here" (Melba Moore)
- "Pick me Up, I'll Dance" (Melba Moore)
- "Let's Stand Together" (Melba Moore)
- "Let's Mend What's Been Broken" (Gloria Gaynor)
- "Determination" (Willie Collins)
- "I Got the Love" (McFadden & Whitehead)
- "You're My Somebody to Love" (McFadden & Whitehead)
- "I've Been Pushed Aside" (McFadden & Whitehead)
- "Got to Change" (McFadden & Whitehead)
- "Do You Want to Dance?" (McFadden & Whitehead)
- "Just Wanna Love You Baby" (McFadden & Whitehead)
- "Mr. Music" (McFadden & Whitehead)
- "This Is My Song" (McFadden & Whitehead)
- "All the Man You Need" (Jerry Bell)

According to the American Top 40 radio program for the week ended August 4, 1979, Casey Kasem reported that McFadden and Whitehead were in Chicago on May 25, 1979, doing various interviews. They agreed to do one more interview at the last moment and decided to reschedule their flight to Los Angeles for the next day, May 26. They were originally scheduled to fly on American Airlines Flight 191 on May 25, which crashed shortly after takeoff from O'Hare International Airport, killing all 258 passengers plus the crew.

== Deaths ==
On May 11, 2004, Whitehead was murdered on the street outside of his Philadelphia home studio, while standing aside as a young man made repairs on his SUV. There, he was shot once by one of several unknown gunmen, who then fled. Whitehead was 55 years old. As of 2022, the murder remains unsolved.

On January 27, 2006, McFadden died of liver and lung cancer. He was 56.

== Discography ==
=== Studio albums ===
Year	Title	Peak chart positions			Certifications	Record label
Year	Title	US	US R&B	CAN	Certifications	Record label
1979	McFadden & Whitehead	23	5	78	US: Gold	Philadelphia International
1980	I Heard It in a Love Song	153	28	—		TSOP
1982	Movin' On	—	64	—		Capitol
"—" denotes a recording that did not chart or was not released in that territory.

=== Compilation albums ===
- Ain't No Stoppin' Us Now: The Best of the PIR Years (2004, Edsel UK)

=== Singles ===
Year	Title	Peak chart positions									Certifications
Year	Title	US	US R&B	US Dan	AUS	CAN	IRE	NLD	NZ	UK	Certifications
1979	"Ain't No Stoppin' Us Now"	13	1	10	56	25	9	39	30	5	BPI: Silver
1979	"Do You Want to Dance"	—	—	—	—	—	—	—	—	—	
1979	"I've Been Pushed Aside"	—	73	—	—	—	—	—	—	—	
1980	"I Heard It in a Love Song"	—	23	74	—	—	—	—	—	—	
1980	"That Lets Me Know I'm in Love"	—	—	—	—	—	—	—	—	—	
1982	"One More Time"	—	58	—	—	—	—	—	—	—	
1984	"Ain't No Stoppin' (Ain't No Way)"	—	—	—	—	—	—	—	—	81	
1985	"Ain't No Stoppin' Us Now" (re-release)	—	—	—	—	—	—	—	—	93	
"—" denotes a recording that did not chart or was not released in that territory.
