= Wake Up! (John Legend and the Roots album) =

Studio album by John Legend and the Roots
- Released: September 21, 2010
- Recorded: 2009–2010
- Genres: R&B; soul; funk; conscious hip-hop; neo soul; reggae
- Length: 62:48
- Labels: GOOD; Home School; Columbia; Sony
- Producers: John Legend; The Roots

John Legend chronology
Evolver (2008)	Wake Up! (2010)	Love in the Future (2013)

The Roots chronology
How I Got Over (2010)	Wake Up! (2010)	Betty Wright: The Movie (2011)

Singles from Wake Up!
- 1. "Wake Up Everybody" Released: April 29, 2010; 2. "Hard Times" Released: September 7, 2010

Wake Up! is the first collaborative album and fourth studio album by American R&B recording artist John Legend and hip-hop band the Roots, released September 21, 2010, by GOOD Music and Columbia Records. The album was produced by Legend with band members Ahmir "Questlove" Thompson and James Poyser, and features guest appearances by CL Smooth, Malik Yusef, Common, and Melanie Fiona, among others. Inspired by the 2008 United States presidential election, Legend and the Roots primarily covered 1960s and 1970s soul music songs for the album with social themes of awareness, engagement, and consciousness.

The album debuted at number eight on the US Billboard 200 chart, selling 63,000 copies in its first week. Upon its release, Wake Up! received positive reviews from most music critics, who complimented its production and the artists' treatment and performance of the material. It would go on to win the 2010 Grammy Award for Best R&B Album.

== Background ==
Wake Up! follows the releases of Legend's Evolver (2008) and the Roots's How I Got Over (2010). Legend and the Roots were inspired to record a collaborative album by the 2008 United States presidential election. In an interview for Billboard, Legend explained the reason for the album's conception at the time, stating "I was in the middle of campaigning for Barack Obama and feeling inspired by the atmosphere in the country at the time, so I wanted to do something musically that reflected that moment. The original idea was to do some sort of covers EP, but the more I got into it with the Roots, it felt like something that should be heard and marketed on its own". The album's title was inspired by Canadian rock band Arcade Fire's song of the same name.

== Music ==
Wake Up! features mostly covers of songs from the soul music of the 1960s and 1970s, and incorporates musical elements from gospel, rock, reggae, and hip-hop. Songs covered for the album include "Wholy Holy" by Marvin Gaye, "Little Ghetto Boy" by Donny Hathaway, "Hard Times" by Baby Huey, and "Hang on in There" by Mike James Kirkland. The lone original song for Wake Up! is the Legend-penned album closer "Shine". A different version of "Shine" was included in the album's deluxe edition and is used during the closing credits of the 2010 film Waiting for "Superman". In an interview for The Guardian, Ahmir "Questlove" Thompson of the Roots said that they intended to cover lesser-known soul songs, stating "I wanted to choose cover songs that were so under the radar, so uniquely interpreted, that it would take you a second to realise that these are cover songs [at all]". Questlove has said that the band's instrumentation for the album is looser than on previous albums, with a jamming and "grass-roots feel". Wake Up! contains lyrical themes concerning social awareness, engagement, and consciousness. The Roots' lead MC Black Thought is featured on few tracks, as the band mostly accompanies Legend's singing with live instrumentation. Other rappers featured on the album include Common, CL Smooth, and Malik Yusef.

== Singles ==
The album's lead single, "Wake Up Everybody", a cover of Harold Melvin & the Blue Notes song of the same name, was released on April 29, 2010, and features rapper Common and Canadian R&B singer Melanie Fiona. It reached number 53 and spent 14 weeks on the US Hot R&B/Hip-Hop Songs chart. The second single, "Hard Times", was released on September 7, 2010, and has the Roots's lead MC Black Thought as a featured artist.

== Reception ==
=== Critical response ===
Professional ratings
Aggregate scores
Source	Rating
Metacritic	77/100
Review scores
Source	Rating
AllMusic	3/5 stars
The A.V. Club	B+
The Guardian	4/5 stars
Los Angeles Times	2.5/4 stars
Mojo	4/5 stars
PopMatters	8/10 stars
Q	4/5 stars
Rolling Stone	4/5 stars
Slant Magazine	2.5/5 stars
Spin	6/10

Wake Up! received generally positive reviews from music critics. At Metacritic, which assigns a normalized rating out of 100 to reviews from mainstream critics, the album received an average score of 77, based on 22 reviews, which indicates "generally favorable reviews". Sean Fennessey of The Washington Post called it "a surprisingly rugged enterprise" and complimented The Roots' "brawny arrangements of a cleverly curated batch of songs". About.com's Mark Edward Nero commended their "outstanding job" as a backing band and called Wake Up! "a very moving, extremely well-performed and well-produced album". Rolling Stone writer Jody Rosen called it "a brilliantly conceived and executed album" and stated "Legend and the Roots capture the old feeling of protest and uplift while updating the sound." Jeff Vrabel of Paste called it "organic and opulent, with a heart of diamonds and a lush sound to match". The Boston Globe's Julian Benbow noted Legend's range and stated, "The Roots band practically makes sonic photocopies of the originals". Newsday's Glenn Gamboa stated, "Legend's rich soul vocals and The Roots' equally lush soul arrangements succeed in updating these classics subtly, making them fit admirably both in the past and the present." Steve Jones of USA Today stated, "The Roots contemporize them with just enough hip-hop flavor, while the soulful Legend injects them with renewed passion". In his Consumer Guide, Robert Christgau gave the album a three-star honorable mention; he picked out two of its songs ("Compared to What" and "I Can't Write Left-Handed") and called it "A myth of conscious soul neither the singer nor his attendant rappers can quite put across".

Chicago Tribune writer Greg Kot noted that "Legend sings with more grit than usual, and the Roots crackle with energy", but stated, "This well-intentioned collection never surpasses the strong originals from which it draws". Mikael Wood of Spin considered that "The results don't always play to [Legend]'s melodic strengths; ?uestlove sounds a bit reined-in, too." AllMusic writer Andy Kellman shared a similar sentiment and commented that "There are several instances when the Roots, who are deeply intimate with grit, outshine Legend, whose polished and pride-rich voice occasionally clashes with the material." Chicago Sun-Times writer Thomas Conner gave it two out of four stars and stated: "Legend might be the weak link; he's not the grittiest singer to be tackling this particular set list – he's often a boy in a man's studio here, especially when he gamely but lamely yeah's through the 12-minute arc of Bill Withers' wartime lament 'I Can't Write Left-Handed' – but his ease mostly makes a dynamic foil for the Roots' muscle and the frequent guest vocals." Zach Cole of URB's criticized Legend's singing as overdone and wrote that the album "run[s] the risk of coming across as entirely cheesy and contrived". Slant Magazine's Jesse Cataldo found it musically "hollow and brittle" and commented that "Many of these treatments are good, but barely justify what amounts to a good-time vanity project for both acts."

Richard Trapunski of NOW viewed that Legend's "straightforward neo-soul delivery often plays it safe", but concluded: "the expertly curated track list and funky arrangements make it more than a tossed-off vanity project." Despite finding its arrangements unadventurous, Los Angeles Times writer Todd Martens called Wake Up! "a respectable love letter, if not quite an urgent one, to artists who shouldn’t be overlooked" and commended Legend for "stretching out of his [comfort zone]... he packs far more spark here than he did on 2008’s 'Evolver'." David Amidon of PopMatters viewed that Legend "not only delivers his most focused effort yet, but his most diverse". Rupert Howe of Q cited Wake Up! as "one of the finest soul albums of recent times" and complimented Legend's vocal "versatility". Dave Simpson of The Guardian noted Legend's "emotional rawness" and wrote that "many of the tracks have a raw, driving feel along the lines of [Marvin] Gaye's Inner City Blues". The A.V. Club's Nathan Rabin commented that "The Roots' tight playing serves the songs and their messages rather than the other way around, while Legend has mastered the art of singing expressively without over-emoting." Brad Wheeler of The Globe and Mail gave the album three out of four stars and commented that they "succeed" in their "attempt to keep these songs 'real' compared to the original versions".

=== Commercial performance ===
The album debuted at number eight on the US Billboard 200 chart, with first-week sales of 63,000 copies in the United States. It also entered at number three on Billboard's R&B/Hip-Hop Albums and Digital Albums charts. In its second week, the album dropped to number 12 on the Billboard 200 and sold 31,000 copies. Wake Up! achieved some international charting. In the Netherlands, it entered at number six on the Dutch Album Top 100, and in Switzerland, the album debuted at number 15 on the Swiss Album Top 100. As of August 2013, the album has sold 273,000 copies in U.S.

== Track listing ==
- All tracks were produced by John Legend and the Roots.

No.	Title	Writer(s)	Original artist	Length
1.	"Hard Times" (featuring Black Thought)	Curtis Mayfield	Baby Huey	5:13
2.	"Compared to What"	Eugene McDaniels	Les McCann; Eddie Harris	6:26
3.	"Wake Up Everybody" (featuring Common and Melanie Fiona)	Victor Carstarphen; Gene McFadden; John Whitehead	Harold Melvin & the Blue Notes	4:26
4.	"Our Generation (The Hope of the World)" (featuring CL Smooth)	Leon Moore; Corey Penn	Ernie Hines	3:15
5.	"Little Ghetto Boy (Prelude)" (featuring Malik Yusef)	Owen Biddle; Kirk Douglass; James Poyser; Ahmir "?uestlove" Thompson; Malik Jones	—	1:58
6.	"Little Ghetto Boy" (featuring Black Thought)	Earl DeRouen; Edward U. Howard	Donny Hathaway	5:26
7.	"Hang on in There"	Mike James Kirkland	Mike James Kirkland	7:15
8.	"Humanity (Love the Way It Should Be)"	Lincoln Thompson	Prince Lincoln Thompson and the Royal Rasses	3:49
9.	"Wholy Holy"	Renaldo Benson; Al Cleveland; Marvin Gaye	Marvin Gaye	5:50
10.	"I Can't Write Left Handed"	Ray Jackson; Bill Withers	Bill Withers	11:44
11.	"I Wish I Knew How It Would Feel to Be Free"	Dick Dallas; Billy Taylor	Nina Simone	2:42
12.	"Shine"	John Stephens	—	4:43

Deluxe edition (bonus tracks)
No.	Title	Writer(s)	Original artist	Length
13.	"Shine" (Waiting for "Superman" Version)	John Stephens	—	4:29
14.	"Wake Up Everybody" (Live in Studio Performance) (featuring Black Thought)	Victor Carstarphen; Gene McFadden; John Whitehead	Harold Melvin & the Blue Notes	5:12

== Personnel ==
Credits for Wake Up! adapted from Allmusic.

=== Musicians ===
- Davis Barnett – viola
- Owen Biddle – bass, group member
- Michelle Bishop – violin
- Black Thought – vocals, group member
- Randy Bowland – guitar
- Jeff Bradshaw – trombone
- Matt Cappy – trumpet, flugelhorn
- Common – vocals
- Natalie Curtis – background vocals
- Captain Kirk Douglas – electric guitar, guitar, group member
- Chris Farr – flute, saxophone
- Timiney Figueroa – background vocals
- Melanie Fiona – vocals
- Ruth Frazier – viola
- Larry Gold – string arrangements, string conductor
- Lacey Jones – background vocals
- Olga Konopelsky – violin
- Emma Kummrow – violin
- John Legend – piano, vocals, background vocals, producer, liner notes
- Jennie Lorenzo – cello
- Charles Parker – violin
- Denise Powell – background vocals
- James Poyser – organ, synthesizer, piano, keyboards, xylophone, producer, group member
- Lenesha Randolph – background vocals
- Ashley Simpson – background vocals
- Linwood Smith Jr. – background vocals
- Tamika Smith – background vocals
- C.L. Smooth – vocals, lyricist
- Igor Szweck – violin
- Gregory Teperman – violin
- Ahmir "?uestlove" Thompson – drums, percussion, producer, group member
- Matia Washington – background vocals
- Jessyca Wilson – vocals, background vocals
- Malik Yusef – lyricist

=== Production ===
- Damien Alexander – A&R
- Nick Banns – engineer, assistant engineer, vocal recording
- Dave Bett – art direction, design
- Dustin Capulong – assistant engineer
- Jimmy Douglass – mixing
- Bojan Dugic – engineer
- Chris Feldmann – art direction, design
- Michelle Holme – art direction, design
- Michael Ilbert – vocal recording
- Ryan Kelly – assistant engineer
- Dave Kutch – mastering
- Derik Lee – assistant engineer
- Mike Makowski:– assistant engineer
- Meaghan Lyons – A&R
- Steve Mandel – engineer
- Anthony Mandler – photography
- Darren Moore – mixing assistant
- Joe Peluso – vocal recording
- Jon Smeltz – engineer
- Chris Soper – engineer, vocal recording
- Maki Suzuki – mixing
- Salamishah Tillet – liner notes
- Alex Venguer – engineer, vocal recording
- Ghian Wright – engineer

== Charts ==
=== Weekly charts ===
Chart (2010)	Peak position
Australian Albums (ARIA)	42
Belgian Albums (Ultratop Flanders)	57
Belgian Albums (Ultratop Wallonia)	98
Canadian Albums (Billboard)	16
Danish Albums (Hitlisten)	38
Dutch Albums (Album Top 100)	6
French Albums (SNEP)	95
German Albums (Offizielle Top 100)	69
Irish Albums (IRMA)	59
Italian Albums (FIMI)	27
Scottish Albums (Official Charts)	74
Swedish Albums (Sverigetopplistan)	29
Swiss Albums (Schweizer Hitparade)	15
UK Albums (Official Charts)	26
US Billboard 200	8
US Top R&B/Hip-Hop Albums (Billboard)	3

=== Year-end charts ===
Chart (2010)	Position
Dutch Albums (Album Top 100)	80
US Top R&B/Hip-Hop Albums (Billboard)	49
Chart (2011)	Position
US Top R&B/Hip-Hop Albums (Billboard)	71
