= To Be True =

Studio album by Harold Melvin & the Blue Notes
- Released: February 1975
- Recorded: Sigma Sound, Philadelphia, Pennsylvania
- Genre: R&B
- Length: 38:46
- Label: Philadelphia International; KZ 33148
- Producer: Kenneth Gamble & Leon Huff

Harold Melvin & the Blue Notes chronology
Black & Blue (1973)	To Be True (1975)	Wake Up Everybody (1975)

Professional ratings
Review scores
Source	Rating
Allmusic	4.5/5 stars
Christgau's Record Guide	B+

To Be True is an album released by Harold Melvin & the Blue Notes on the Philadelphia International record label in February 1975. It was produced by Kenneth Gamble & Leon Huff.

The album features the hit singles "Bad Luck", "Hope That We Can Be Together Soon" with Sharon Paige, and "Where Are All My Friends".

The album was remastered and reissued with bonus tracks in 2016 by Big Break Records.

== Track listing ==
Side one
No.	Title	Writer(s)	Length
1.	"Where Are All My Friends"	Gene McFadden, John Whitehead, Victor Carstarphen	3:22
2.	"To Be True"	Kenneth Gamble, Leon Huff	4:42
3.	"Pretty Flower"	McFadden, Whitehead, Carstarphen	5:42
4.	"Hope That We Can Be Together Soon" (Female vocal by Sharon Paige)	Gamble, Huff	3:45

Side two
No.	Title	Writer(s)	Length
5.	"Nobody Could Take Your Place"	Gamble, Huff	4:22
6.	"Somewhere Down the Line"	Gamble, Huff	4:55
7.	"Bad Luck"	McFadden, Whitehead, Carstarphen	6:29
8.	"All Because of a Woman"	McFadden, Whitehead, Huff	5:29

2016 remastered reissue bonus tracks
No.	Title	Length
9.	"Hope That We Can Be Together Soon" (Single Version)	3:26
10.	"Bad Luck" (Tom Moulton Mix)	7:56

== Personnel ==
- Harold Melvin, Teddy Pendergrass, Bernard Wilson, Lawrence Brown, Jerry Cummings – vocals
- Sharon Paige – female vocalist on "Hope That We Can Be Together Soon"
- MFSB – music
- Carla Benson, Evette Benton, Barbara Ingram - background vocals

== Charts ==
Chart (1975)	Peak
U.S. Billboard Top LPs	26
U.S. Billboard Top Soul LPs	1

Singles

Year	Single	Peak chart positions		
Year	Single	US	US R&B	US Dance
1974	"Where Are All My Friends"	80	8	11
1975	"Bad Luck (Part 1)"	15	4	1
1975	"Hope That We Can Be Together Soon"	42	1	—

== Samples ==
Cyndi Lauper used an interpolation of "Where Are All My Friends" in the 2008 song "Set Your Heart" from her album Bring Ya to the Brink.

== See also ==
- List of Billboard number-one R&B albums of 1975
