= McFadden & Whitehead (album) =

Studio album by McFadden & Whitehead
- Released: May 1, 1979
- Recorded: 1978–1979
- Studios: Sigma Sound, Philadelphia, Pennsylvania
- Genres: Disco; R&B; Philadelphia soul; funk
- Length: 42:37
- Label: Philadelphia International
- Producers: Gene McFadden; John Whitehead; Jerry Cohen

McFadden & Whitehead chronology
McFadden & Whitehead (1979)	I Heard It in a Love Song (1980)

Professional ratings
Review scores
Source	Rating
Music Week	3/4 stars

McFadden & Whitehead is the debut album of the R&B duo of the same name, released in 1979. The album peaked at #5 on the R&B charts and #23 on the Billboard 200. The lead single "Ain't No Stoppin' Us Now" topped the R&B charts, was #10 on the disco charts, and peaked at #13 on the Hot 100. The song "I've Been Pushed Aside" peaked at #73 R&B.

== Track listing ==
All songs were composed by Gene McFadden, John Whitehead and Jerry Cohen

1. "Ain't No Stoppin' Us Now" – 7:02
2. "I've Been Pushed Aside" – 5:14
3. "Mr. Music" – 5:10
4. "Just Wanna Love You Baby" – 3:58
5. "Got to Change" – 6:00
6. "You're My Someone to Love" – 4:36
7. "I Got the Love" – 3:33
8. "Do You Want to Dance" – 7:05

== Singles ==
On Philadelphia International:

- ZS8-3681: "Ain't No Stoppin' Us Now"/"I Got the Love"
- ZS9-3704: "Do You Want to Dance"/"Mr. Music"
- ZS9-3725: "I've Been Pushed Aside"/"You're My Someone to Love"

== Personnel ==
- Gene McFadden – vocals
- John Whitehead – vocals
- Bobby Eli, Dennis Harris – guitar
- Jimmie Williams – bass
- Jerry Cohen – keyboards
- Keith Benson – drums
- Bobby Cupid, David Cruse, Don Renaldo – percussion
- Barbara Ingram, Carla Benson, Evette Benton, The Futures – backing vocals
