= Bring Ya to the Brink =

Studio album by Cyndi Lauper
- Released: May 27, 2008
- Recorded: 2008
- Genre: Dance-pop
- Length: 49:36
- Label: Epic
- Producers: Cyndi Lauper; Peer Åström; Axwell; Basement Jaxx; Johan Bobäck; Digital Dog; Dragonette; DJ Emz; Kleerup; Richard Morel; The Scumfrog; William Wittman

Cyndi Lauper chronology
The Body Acoustic (2005)	Bring Ya to the Brink (2008)	True Colors: The Best of Cyndi Lauper (2009)

Floor Remixes cover

Singles from Bring Ya to the Brink
- 1. "Set Your Heart" Released: 2008 (Japan only); 2. "Same Ol' Story" Released: May 6, 2008; 3. "Into the Nightlife" Released: September 22, 2008

Bring Ya to the Brink is American singer Cyndi Lauper's tenth studio album, released on May 14, 2008 in Japan, and 13 days later worldwide. The album is a collection of dance-oriented songs and features collaborations with Basement Jaxx, Richard Morel, Max Martin and Kleerup, among others. Regarded as one of the singer's best works at the time it was released, the Songwriters Hall of Fame has regarded the album track "High and Mighty" as one of Lauper's key songs. The album received a nomination for Best Dance/Electronica Album at the 51st Annual Grammy Awards. The song "Set Your Heart" was released as a promotional single in Japan in early 2008, while "Same Ol' Story" was the first official single released on May 6, 2008. "Into the Nightlife" was released as the second single.

The album is Lauper's last release to date of original material in addition to being her last for Epic Records, her label since her 1983 debut solo album She's So Unusual. The album debuted at #41 on the Billboard 200, with 12,000 copies sold. A remix album, titled Floor Remixes, was released exclusively in Japan on February 18, 2009, in a CD-only edition and a limited edition that featured a CD and a DVD, it reached the position of #102 on the Oricon charts. To promote the remix album, a mashup of "Girls Just Want to Have Fun" and "Set Your Heart" was made by Richard Morel.

== Background and music ==
Lauper visited England and Sweden during early 2007 where she wrote songs with dance artists such as The Scumfrog, Basement Jaxx, Digital Dog, Dragonette, Kleerup and Axwell. She also wrote and produced four of the album's tracks with Washington DC DJ Richard Morel. Art direction on the album was credited to Cyndi Lauper, Sheri Lee & Meghan Foley, with photography by Stefanie Schneider. In interview with Brazilian newspaper Extra the singer revealed: "On this record, I worked with many producers who make dance music... Anyway, dance music is pop. And I make pop music. By the way, I always had dance songs on my records. I just decided to get into the dance community a little more this time, doing something more innovative."

Bring Ya to the Brink is a dance-pop record with influences spanning Eurodisco, soul, pop, deep house, electro and nu-disco.

== Singles ==
"Set Your Heart" was released as a promo-only single in Japan, where it received considerable airplay. Peaking at No. 11 on the Billboard Japan Hot 100 Singles. The first single of the album was "Same Ol' Story", it was released worldwide on May 6, 2008. It topped the U.S. Billboard Hot Dance Club Play and stayed on the chart for several weeks. The second single of the album was "Into the Nightlife", it was released on August 8, 2008. The music video for the song was partly filmed at Splash Bar in New York City on May 20, 2008. Fans were invited to come be extras in the video. It was a huge club hit in the U.S. topping the Billboard Hot Dance Club Play and peaking at No. 5 on the Billboard Hot Dance Airplay. Dance radio station Energy 92.7FM in San Francisco announced that "Echo" would be the third single, but no release eventuated. The song itself was promoted in June 2012 by WWE when Lauper returned to the company for a special appearance. According to the Brazilian newspaper O Globo, the song thrilled and was one of the favorites from the audience at the concert the singer did in Brazil, in 2008.

== Tour and promotion ==
To support the album, Lauper toured the world in 2008. She embarked on the Bring Ya to the Brink World Tour in support of the album in countries outside of the United States: The show ventured to Australia in the spring of 2008 and Japan, Europe and South America in the fall of 2008. In the United States she toured in the summer with the True Colors 2008 tour to support the album there. The album listed at No. 7 on the Attitude Magazine's top ten albums of 2008 and also came in at No. 8 on Amazon's Best Pop albums of 2008. "Echo" was featured in the Gossip Girl episode "Bonfire of the Vanity", in which Lauper had a cameo at Blair Waldorf's 18th birthday party celebration. "High and Mighty" was in an episode of Ugly Betty. Lauper performed "Into the Nightlife" live on The Graham Norton Show, in series 4 episode 2, first broadcast on October 9, 2008.

== Critical reception ==
Professional ratings
Aggregate scores
Source	Rating
Metacritic	69/100
Review scores
Source	Rating
AllMusic	3.5/5 stars
Billboard	(favorable)
Blender	3.5/5 stars
Entertainment Weekly	B
The New York Times	(mixed)
NOW	(favorable)
The Observer	(positive)
PopMatters	(7/10)
Rolling Stone	3/5 stars
Slant Magazine	3.5/5 stars

The album received favorable reviews from music critics. Stephen Thomas Erlewine from AllMusic gave the album three and a half stars out of five and pointed out that it is difficult to define the singer's career, because she changes her style constantly, sometimes sounding retro, sometimes modern, or mixing the two, like in Bring Ya to the Brink. Chuck Taylor from Billboard gave a favorable review to the record and noted that while it exploits the artificiality of the dancefloor, its lyrics carry a strong message that won't always be noticed by the public. Barry Walters from Blender gave the album three and a half stars out of five and said that with the social messages of the songs, Lauper has never sounded more relevant since her first album She's So Unusual. Simon Vozick-Levinson from Entertainment Weekly magazine gave the album a B rating and praised the singer's finally returning to the dance floor world. The New York Times gave a mixed review, describing the record as "a stubbornly fluorescent record, long on thudding downbeats and short on nuance or grace". Evan Davies from Toronto's NOW newspaper gave the record three (NNN) out of five and wrote that while there are clear references to the work of artists like Daft Punk and Kylie Minogue, "Lauper’s personality, always her greatest asset, manages to come through on the bulk of Brink" and that although there are a few songs that just fill the record, it "is fun and catchy". Liz Hoggard of The Observer praised the album and said "this is the album Madonna should have made instead of Hard Candy". Caryn Ganz from Rolling Stone magazine gave it three stars out of five and wrote that the album never comes close to "a full serotonin burst" like Madonna's 2005 album Confessions on a Dance Floor, but "it brings Lauper's credit to once again innovate her repertoire." Slant Magazine gave the album three and a half stars out of five and pointed out that although the album isn't mainstream enough to bring a triumphant comeback in Lauper's career, it recaptures the singer's artistic relevance and stands out as a superior alternative to Hard Candy, by Madonna.

== Commercial performance ==
Bring Ya to the Brink debuted at No. 41 with 12,000 sold, became the singer's first U.S. pop album since 1996's Sisters of Avalon. By August 22, 2008 it has sold 33,000 in the U.S. according to Nielsen SoundScan.

== Track listing ==
Bring Ya to the Brink – Standard edition
No.	Title	Writer(s)	Producer(s)	Length
1.	"High and Mighty"	Cyndi Lauper; Jesse Houk	Lauper; Scumfrog	4:43
2.	"Into the Nightlife"	Lauper; Peer Åström; Johan Bobäck; Max Martin	Lauper; Åström; Bobäck	4:00
3.	"Rocking Chair"	Lauper; Felix Buxton; Simon Ratcliffe	Lauper; Basement Jaxx	3:39
4.	"Echo"	Lauper; Åström; Bobäck; William Wittman	Lauper; Åström; Bobäck	3:55
5.	"Lyfe"	Lauper; Roger Fife; Melissa Greene; Sammy Merendino	Lauper; DJ Emz	3:38
6.	"Same Ol' Story"	Lauper; Richard Morel	Lauper; Morel	5:54
7.	"Raging Storm"	Lauper; Morel	Lauper; Morel	5:23
8.	"Lay Me Down"	Lauper; Andreas Kleerup	Lauper; Kleerup	3:28
9.	"Give It Up"	Lauper; Steve Cornish; Nicholas Mace	Lauper; Digital Dog	3:23
10.	"Set Your Heart"	Lauper; Morel; Victor Carstarphen; Gene McFadden; John Whitehead	Lauper; Morel	3:42
11.	"Grab a Hold"	Lauper; Dan Kurtz; Martina Sorbara	Lauper; Dragonette	3:27
12.	"Rain on Me"	Lauper; Chau Phan; Axel Hedfors; Alexander Kronlund	Lauper; Axwell	4:24

Bring Ya to the Brink –Japanese and special editions
No.	Title	Writer(s)	Producer(s)	Length
13.	"Got Candy"	Lauper; Morel	Lauper; Morel	3:53
14.	"Can't Breathe"	Lauper; Phan; Kronlund	Lauper; Wittman	3:58

Bring Ya to the Brink – Floor Remixes
No.	Title	Length
1.	"Girls Just Wanna Have Fun/Set Your Heart"
2.	"Into the Nightlife" (Freedombunch Remix)
3.	"Same Ol' Story" (Pink Noise Remix)
4.	"Time After Time" (Freedombunch Remix)
5.	"Set Your Heart" (Freedombunch Remix)
6.	"High and Mighty" (Tom Novy Remix)
7.	"Into the Nightlife" (Johnny Pinkfinger vs Mihell Remix)
8.	"Same Ol' Story" (Extended Mix)
9.	"Girls Just Wanna Have Fun" (X Set Your Heart Mashup)
10.	"True Colors" (Ukawanimation! Remix)
11.	"DVD : Girls Just Wanna Set Your Heart"
12.	"DVD : Set Your Heart" (Freedombunch Remix)
13.	"DVD : Set Your Heart" (Freedombunch Remix - Tomovie Version)
14.	"DVD : Set Your Heart" (Freedombunch Remix - Usagi TANAKA (SCORT+) Version)
15.	"DVD : Director Interview"

== Personnel ==
- Cyndi Lauper – vocals, production
- Martina Sorbara – backing vocals (track 11)
- Axwell – all instruments and drum programming except as listed below
- Knox Chandler – guitars (tracks 6, 7, 10, 11)
- Richard Morel – guitars, keyboards (tracks 6, 7, 10)
- Stephen Gaboury – keyboards (tracks 5, 11)
- Dan Kurtz – keyboards (track 11)
- Roger Fife – synthesizers (track 5)
- William Wittman – guitar, electric bass, synth bass (track 11)
- Dave Finnell – trumpet (tracks 6, 7, 10)
- Craig Considine – trombone (tracks 6, 7, 10)
- Sammy Merendino – drums (track 5)

Sample credits

- "Set Your Heart" contains an interpolation of Harold Melvin & the Blue Notes' "Where Are All My Friends", written by Victor Carstarphen, Gene McFadden, and John Whitehead.

== Accolades ==
Year	Nominee / work	Award	Result
2009	"Bring Ya to the Brink"	Grammy Award for Best Electronic/Dance Album	Nominated

== Charts ==
Chart (2008)	Peak Position
Australian Albums (ARIA)	87
Austrian Albums (Ö3 Austria)	48
Canadian Albums (Billboard)	40
French Albums (SNEP)	129
Japanese Albums (Oricon)	18
Japanese International Albums (Oricon)	5
U.S. Billboard 200	41
U.S. Billboard Digital Albums	9
U.S. Billboard Internet Albums	17

== Release history ==
Region	Date	Label	Format	Catalog
Japan	May 14, 2008	Sony Music Japan	CD with bonus tracks	EICP 968
United States; UK	May 27, 2008	Epic Records	CD	706592
United States; UK	May 27, 2008	Epic Records	Paid download	706592
Argentina	May 27, 2008	Sony BMG	CD	706592
Finland	May 28, 2008	–	–	–
South Korea	June 3, 2008	Sony BMG Music Entertainment Korea	CD	SB10444C
Australia	June 7, 2008	Epic	CD	88697065922
Australia	June 7, 2008	Epic	Paid download	88697065922
China	2008	Sony BMG	CD	9787799428642
Indonesia	August 15, 2008	Sony BMG	CD	–
Indonesia	August 15, 2008	Sony BMG	Cassette	–
