= Wake Up Everybody (2004 album) =

Compilation album by Various artists
- Released: September 16, 2004
- Label: Bungalo

Wake Up Everybody is a compilation album released to coincide with the 2004 presidential election in the U.S. It featured a variety of musical stars, primarily hip hop and R&B artists, who sing songs to urge young Americans to vote. The executive producers of the album were Kenneth "Babyface" Edmonds, Tracey Edmonds, Russell Simmons and Jonathan Lewis. The project was a collaboration with America Coming Together, a political group with the goal of defeating incumbent President George W. Bush. Despite this connection, the album was portrayed by its producers as a non-partisan project.

In August 2004, the project began with the reworking of "Wake Up Everybody", a 1976 R&B hit song by Harold Melvin & the Blue Notes. The new version of the song was released for radio airplay on August 16 and it reached number 119 on the Billboard Hot R&B/Hip-Hop Songs Chart. The song was released for retail purchase in album form on September 16. The artists featured on the song are Missy Elliott, Ashanti, Mariah Carey, Mary J. Blige, Brandy, Wyclef Jean, Monica, Eve, Queen Latifah, Usher, Snoop Dogg, Musiq, Jamie Foxx, Rev Run and Russell Simmons. Also on the track are Jadakiss, Fabolous, Mýa, Faith Evans, Claudette Ortiz, Ray J, Tamia, Nate Dogg, Robin Thicke, Floetry, Joss Stone, Bilal, Jon B, MC Lyte, Miri Ben-Ari, Nas, Ellie Lawson, Omarion and Raphael Saadiq. The album release includes other reworked songs and also previously released songs. It ends with a 50-minute behind-the-scenes documentary on the making of the album, which highlights the remarkable speed with which these artists came together to support the cause.

The Vote For Change tour of September–October 2004, also benefiting America Coming Together (ACT), was joined by Babyface appearing on the same stage as John Mellencamp in six cities, the final performance held with multiple artists at the MCI Center in Washington DC. The various tour dates raised about $10 million for ACT.

== Featured artists ==
- Akon
- Ashanti
- Kenneth "Babyface" Edmonds
- Ben Jelen
- Bilal
- Bonnie McKee
- Bonnie Raitt
- Brandy
- Claudette Ortiz
- Don Yute
- Eric Clapton
- Ellie Lawson
- Emmylou Harris
- Everclear
- Eve
- Fabolous
- Faith Evans
- Farena
- Floetry
- Freckles
- Jadakiss
- Jamie Foxx
- Jaheim
- Jon B
- Joss Stone
- Julia Fordham
- Jurassic 5
- Kristine W
- Lady Saw
- Lenny Kravitz
- Mariah Carey
- Mary J. Blige
- Marques Houston
- Matt Nathanson
- MC Lyte
- Monica
- Miri Ben-Ari
- Missy Elliott
- Mrnorth
- Musiq
- Mýa
- Mystic
- Nas
- Nate Dogg
- Of a Revolution
- Omarion
- Queen Latifah
- Ray J
- Raphael Saadiq
- Rev Run
- Res
- Robin Thicke
- Russell Simmons
- Seal
- Snoop Dogg
- Solange Knowles
- The Latin Kings
- Tamia
- Tracey Edmonds
- Toni Braxton
- Tweet
- Usher
- Wayne Wonder
- Wyclef Jean
- Yoko Ono

== Track listing ==
1. "Wake Up Everybody" - Various Artists
2. "Give Peace a Chance 2004" - Yoko Ono
3. "Why the Fighting" - Ellie Lawson
4. "Talking About a Revolution" - Ben Jelen
5. "Hell to Pay" - Bonnie Raitt
6. "Freedom" - Jurassic 5
7. "Fear" - Lenny Kravitz
8. "Raise This Land" - Freckles featuring Res and Mystic
9. "Get It Together" - Seal
10. "Time in Babylon" - Emmylou Harris
11. "This Land Is Your Land" - Everclear
12. "Right on Time" - O.A.R.
13. "Speak No Evil" - Mr. North
14. "The Wind" - Matt Nathanson
15. "One Sound" - TLK, Lady Saw, Wayne Wonder, Don Yute and Farena
16. "Change the World" - Eric Clapton & Babyface
