= Wake Up Everybody (Harold Melvin & the Blue Notes album) =

Studio album by Harold Melvin & the Blue Notes
- Released: November 29, 1975
- Studio: Sigma Sound, Philadelphia, Pennsylvania
- Genre: R&B
- Length: 39:01
- Label: Philadelphia International; PZ 33808
- Producer: Kenneth Gamble & Leon Huff

Harold Melvin & the Blue Notes chronology
To Be True (1975)	Wake Up Everybody (1975)	Collectors' Item: All Their Greatest Hits! (1976)

Professional ratings
Review scores
Source	Rating
Allmusic	4/5 stars
Christgau's Record Guide	B+

Wake Up Everybody is an album released by Harold Melvin & the Blue Notes on the Philadelphia International record label in November 1975. It was produced by Kenneth Gamble & Leon Huff. This would be the last album to include Teddy Pendergrass before he left the group for a solo career.

The album features the hit singles "Wake Up Everybody" and "Tell the World How I Feel About 'Cha Baby". "Don't Leave Me This Way", which would be reinterpreted two years later by Thelma Houston, was a hit on the UK Singles Chart, peaking at #5. The lead vocal on the closing album track, "Searching for a Love", was performed virtually solo by Sharon Paige, who also performed duet duties with Pendergrass and Melvin on the song "You Know How to Make Me Feel So Good."

The album was remastered and reissued with a bonus track, a Tom Moulton remixed version of "Don't Leave Me This Way", in 2008 by Legacy Recordings.

== Track listing ==
All tracks are written by John Whitehead, Gene McFadden and Victor Carstarphen, except where noted.

Side one
No.	Title	Writer(s)	Length
1.	"Wake Up Everybody"		7:30
2.	"Keep on Lovin' You"		3:40
3.	"You Know How to Make Me Feel So Good"	Kenneth Gamble, Leon Huff	5:17

Side two
No.	Title	Writer(s)	Length
4.	"Don't Leave Me This Way"	Gamble, Huff, Cary Gilbert	6:08
5.	"Tell the World How I Feel About 'Cha Baby"		5:54
6.	"To Be Free to Be Who We Are"		5:09
7.	"I'm Searching for a Love"	Gamble, Huff	5:23

2008 remastered reissue bonus track
No.	Title	Length
8.	"Don't Leave Me This Way" (A Tom Moulton Mix)	7:05

== Personnel ==
- Harold Melvin, Teddy Pendergrass, Bernard Wilson, Lawrence Brown, Jerry Cummings – vocals
- Sharon Paige – female vocalist on "You Know How to Make Me Feel So Good" and "I'm Searching for a Love"
- MFSB – music
- Edward Soyka – illustrations, artwork

== Charts ==
Chart (1975)	Peak
U.S. Billboard Top LPs	9
U.S. Billboard Top Soul LPs	1

Singles

Year	Single	Peak chart positions			
Year	Single	US	US R&B	US Dance	UK
1975	"Wake Up Everybody (Part 1)"	12	1	—	23
1976	"Tell the World How I Feel About 'Cha Baby"	94	7	4	—
1977	"Don't Leave Me This Way"	—	—	—	5

== See also ==
- List of Billboard number-one R&B albums of 1976
