= Bernard Wilson (singer) =

American singer (1946–2010)

Bernard Wilson (July 12, 1946 – December 26, 2010) was a second tenor and baritone R&B, funk and soul music vocalist, who was a member of Harold Melvin & the Blue Notes, and thus helped to define the “Sound of Philadelphia” in the 1970s.

== Early career ==
Wilson was a North Philadelphia native who grew up in the Strawberry Mansion neighborhood. His parents died while Wilson was still young, and thereafter, he was raised by his grandmother. He attended Bok Technical High School, but left home at the age of 16 to seek fame and fortune as an entertainer. In 1970, Wilson joined the evolving line-up of Harold Melvin and the Blue Notes, which featured Harold Melvin—another native of Philadelphia. With the addition of Teddy Pendergrass to the group and the release of their first record, the Blue Notes achieved great success. Their self-titled LP with Philadelphia International Records overseen by Kenneth Gamble and Leon Huff, landed three singles on the Billboard charts. It was this early to mid-1970s lineup that had such hits as "If You Don't Know Me by Now," "The Love I Lost," "Don't Leave Me This Way," and "Bad Luck." Other chart toppers for the band such as "I Miss You" and "Wake Up Everybody, from their five self-titled platinum records, soon followed. Wilson stayed with the Blue Notes through six albums and then left the group in 1977, shortly after Teddy Pendergrass's departure, to pursue a solo career.

== Later career ==
Wilson had hoped to recover from his illnesses and sing gospel; however, the last time he performed was during the 1990s, at the Trump Taj Mahal in Atlantic City.

=== Death ===
Wilson died of complications of a stroke and heart attack on December 26, 2010, at age 64.

== Discography ==
=== With Harold Melvin and the Blue Notes ===
- Harold Melvin & The Blue Notes (1972)
- Black & Blue (1973)
- To Be True (1975)
- Wake Up Everybody (1975)
- Reaching for the World (1976)
- Now Is the Time (1977)
