= David Ebo =

American singer (b. 1950, d. 1993)

David Ebo (November 9, 1950 – November 30, 1993) was an American singer from Philadelphia, Pennsylvania. In 1976, Harold Melvin was looking for a lead singer for his group, Harold Melvin & the Blue Notes after Teddy Pendergrass left, eventually hiring Ebo to replace Teddy. Joining the Blue Notes, Ebo sang lead on four albums starting with Reaching for the World and ending with All Things Happen In Time (1981). He sang lead on songs like Reaching for the World, Hostage, and Prayin'. In 1982, Ebo left the group and was replaced by Gil Saunders. In 1985, he released his only solo album "I'd Rather Be By Myself" on Domino Records under his last name, Ebo. The title track peaked at no. 37 on the charts. Ebo died on November 30, 1993, from bone cancer at 43 years old, 21 days after his 43rd birthday.
