= I Miss You (album) =

Studio album by Harold Melvin & the Blue Notes
- Released: August 25, 1972
- Recorded: 1971–1972
- Studio: Sigma Sound, Philadelphia, Pennsylvania
- Genre: R&B
- Length: 36:43
- Label: Philadelphia International
- Producer: Kenneth Gamble & Leon Huff

Harold Melvin & the Blue Notes chronology
I Miss You (1972)	Black & Blue (1973)

Harold Melvin & the Blue Notes
- Reissue title and cover

Professional ratings
Review scores
Source	Rating
AllMusic	4/5 stars
Christgau's Record Guide	B
Mojo	(favorable)
The New Rolling Stone Record Guide	3/5 stars
Pitchfork	8.0/10

I Miss You (later reissued as Harold Melvin & the Blue Notes) is the debut album by Harold Melvin & the Blue Notes, released on Philadelphia International in August 25, 1972. Produced by Kenneth Gamble & Leon Huff, the album was recorded at Sigma Sound Studios in Philadelphia.

The album title was changed from I Miss You to Harold Melvin & the Blue Notes and given a new cover after the success of the single "If You Don't Know Me by Now". The group's roster for this album is Lloyd Parks, Teddy Pendergrass, Harold Melvin, Lawrence Brown and Bernie Wilson. The album was arranged by Bobby Martin, Norman Harris and Thom Bell.

The album was remastered and reissued with bonus tracks in 2010 by Big Break Records.

== Track listing ==
All tracks are written by Gamble and Huff, except where noted.

Side one
No.	Title	Writer(s)	Length
1.	"I Miss You"		8:31
2.	"Ebony Woman"	Morris Bailey	3:37
3.	"Yesterday I Had the Blues"		7:25

Side two
No.	Title	Writer(s)	Length
4.	"If You Don't Know Me by Now"		3:27
5.	"Be for Real"	Leon Huff, Cary Gilbert, Kenneth Gamble	7:31
6.	"Let Me into Your World"	Kenneth Gamble, Norman Harris, Allan Felder	2:40
7.	"Let It Be You"		3:32

2010 remastered reissue bonus tracks
No.	Title	Length
8.	"I Miss You" (part I – single version)	3:20
9.	"Yesterday I Had the Blues" (single version)	3:54
10.	"Be for Real" (single version)	3:24
11.	"If You Don't Know Me by Now" (live in San Francisco, 1973)	4:08

== Personnel ==
=== The Blue Notes ===
- Harold Melvin
- Teddy Pendergrass
- Bernard Wilson
- Lawrence Brown
- Lloyd Parks – vocals

=== Other personnel ===
- Leon Huff – piano
- Leonard Pakula – organ
- Ronnie Baker – bass
- Earl Young – drums
- Norman Harris, Roland Chambers, Bobby Eli – guitar
- Larry Washington – congas, bongos
- Vincent Montana Jr. – vibraphone
- Don Renaldo and his Strings – strings
- Sam Reed and his Horns – horns

== Charts ==
Chart performance for I Miss You
Chart (1972)	Peak position
US Billboard Top LPs	53
US Billboard Top Soul LPs	4

Chart performance of singles from I Miss You
Year	Single	Peak chart positions		
Year	Single	US	US R&B	UK
1972	"I Miss You (Part 1)"	58	7	—
1972	"If You Don't Know Me by Now"	3	1	9
1973	"Yesterday I Had the Blues"	63	12	—
