= Clare Quilty =

Clare Quilty may refer to:

- Clare Quilty, a fictional character in Nabokov's 1955 novel Lolita
- Clare Quilty (group), an American musical group
- Quilty, County Clare, town in Ireland
