= The Scumfrog =

The Scumfrog (Jesse Houk)
- Also known as: The Scumfrog; Dutch
- Born: Jesse Houk; October 3, 1971 (age 54); Amsterdam, Netherlands
- Genres: Electronica; Techno; House
- Occupation(s): Disc Jockey; Music producer
- Years active: 1997–present
- Website: http://www.thescumfrog.com/

The Scumfrog (Jesse Houk) (born October 3, 1971) is a Dutch-American DJ/remixer/producer/artist, mostly known for his underground flavored remixes of artists like Kylie Minogue, Missy Elliott, New Order, and Annie Lennox and his collaborations writing and producing techno-oriented works with David Bowie, Cyndi Lauper, and Sting. He released four albums as a solo artist (Extended Engagement 2003, Simmer 2004, A Place Where We Belong 2011 and In Case We're All Still Here 2013). As a DJ, he has toured the world many times over, between 2008 and 2014 he hosted and produced the weekly radio show/podcast Glam Scum International, and in 2015 he launched a new series of club nights named M.B.T.S.(Most Below The Surface).

== Biography ==
=== Early career: 1997 – 2007 ===
Jesse Houk was born in Amsterdam, Netherlands, to an American father and a Dutch mother. After finishing college, his dual citizenship allowed him to move to New York City in 1997 where he started producing music under his new alias The Scumfrog. Between 1997 and 2000 he lived between New York City — where he DJ’d Deep House and Tech House in NY's East Village lounges, such as the Opium Den — and the Netherlands, where he worked with his production partner Jacques Sperwer. Jacques and Jesse released several singles under various names such as Jake & Jesse, Barbarus and a full-length album on BMG Bertelsmann Music Group under the name Resonance. In this period he also recorded his first work under the Scumfrog alias, called The Watersong, which was selected by Danny Tenaglia -- DJ Magazine’s number 1 DJ in the world at the time -- for his Global Underground Athens compilation.

After the underground buzz of The Watersong, The Scumfrog signed an album deal with Roger Sanchez, who also took him as his opening DJ on his 2001 tour. That summer, The Scumfrog single “We Love You” (based on the Beatles/Rolling Stones collaboration) went to number one in most European dance charts and put the Scumfrog name on the map.

The Scumfrog career has largely been marked by an ability to work with mainstream artists without sacrificing his underground sound. Between 2001 and 2007, The Scumfrog scored more than 10 number 1 Billboard Hot Dance Music/Club Play records remixing mainstream artists like Britney Spears, Enrique Iglesias, Annie Lennox, Jewel, J-pop superstar Hikaru Utada but rarely ever making full vocal remixes of the artists he worked with. His EMI collaboration with David Bowie, remixing his 1984 single “Loving the Alien,” set the tone for a career that would thrive simultaneously in underground clubs and in mainstream recording studios. While on duty for the stars, he never stopped remixing for respected underground Dance Music labels such as Positiva, Intec, Yoshitoshi Recordings, Bedrock Records and Strictly Rhythm, doing remixes for his DJ peers such as Steve Lawler, Planet Funk, Boris Dlugosh, and Dirty Vegas.

His first album, Extended Engagement (2003, EMI/Positiva/Effin) was a two disc mix compilation exclusively of his own productions and remixes, including his own singles "We Love You", "Music Revolution", and "Learning To Fly".

Jesse released more radio-friendly records under the alias Dutch, getting his first number one on the Billboard Hot Dance Music/Club Play chart in 2003, "My Time" which he co-wrote with vocalist Crystal Waters. The follow-up to "My Time" was the single "Why Should I Think About The Rain", featuring Grammy winning singer/songwriter and Rolling Stones back-up singer Lisa Fischer.

In 2004, The Scumfrog won the International Dance Music Award (IDMA) for 'Best Remixer' of 2003.

His second album Simmer (2004, Effin) was the first album where Jesse himself wrote all the songs (no remixes of other artists). It featured the singles "Music Revolution", "Simmer", "Come On", and a duet "Bacon" with his longtime friend, singer Lucy Woodward. Simmer did not have a huge impact, largely because it was marketed and promoted solely by The Scumfrog's own label, and because the songs on the album were not nearly as DJ-friendly as his previous work.

In 2005, The Scumfrog's most successful single "Music Revolution" was chosen for Chevrolet's long running Chevrolet HHR commercial on TV and radio. In the same year, Jesse formed the band DJs Are Alive with fellow DJ/performers DJ Skribble, D:Fuse, Static Revenger and Kristine W. The band's mission was to sound like a DJ set and look like a band. DJs Are Alive performed a series of shows in 2006, but disbanded allegedly due to continuing scheduling conflicts with their gigs as individual DJs.

Upon his return to the US after a long European tour in 2007, Jesse decided to trade his New York City home for the desert and mountains of New Mexico where he lived until 2015.

=== 2007 – Present: Grammy nomination, Glam Scum International ===
One of the biggest successes of his career came in the form of an unreleased Scumfrog remix of Peter Bjorn & John "The Young Folks", which went viral during the summer of 2007, and in its unreleased bootleg form made it to the playlists of many mainstream radio stations. At the same time, his collaboration with Italian DJ/Producer Tommy Vee in covering Steve Miller Band's 1970s hit "Serenade" also made it into many European pop-charts.

In 2008, the Scumfrog started a weekly hour-long radio show Glam Scum on Sirius Satellite Radio in the US. A year later, after a merger between Sirius and Satellite radio company XM, the show was dropped, and the show was re-launched as Glam Scum International and licensed to several radio stations around the world.

During 2007, The Scumfrog had been writing and recording with Cyndi Lauper in New York on her dance music album Bring Ya To The Brink. Their song "High and Mighty" became the opening track of the album, which was released in 2008 and nominated for a Grammy Award in the category ‘Best Dance Album’ in 2009. (The album lost to fellow nominees Daft Punk.)

In 2011, The Scumfrog reunited with his underground roots in the custom-made DJ set "A Place Where We Belong". Similarly to his debut album Extended Engagement, the mix consists of 12 original productions (some his own, some remixes of other artists). Jesse himself announced that he did not want to call it an album because ‘DJs are not supposed to make albums, DJs are supposed to make DJ mixes’. The new material was offered in a non-stop DJ mix on his Facebook page where – in a video – Jesse explained his voluntary donation system for his new music. Many of the songs on "A Place Where We Belong" were licensed to labels for single-release. "In Love" was released on Umek’s label 1605, "Illusion" came out on Floorplay, "Running" on Inkfish, and "Don’t Give Up" featuring Vassy (a cover of Peter Gabriel and Kate Bush) on Armada.

Armada Music released The Scumfrog's fourth album, In Case We're All Still Here in 2013, which features his collaboration with Sting. The two teamed up to remake Sting's 1993 hit "If I Ever Lose My Faith in You".

In 2015, he released the single "Send Wave" on Hot Since 82 label Knee Deep In Sound.

=== DJ career ===
As a DJ, The Scumfrog has toured the world many times over. Even though he has played many festivals over the past ten years (Burning Man being his favorite), he makes it clear that he prefers smaller venues with great sound systems for the music that he plays. In 2015, he started a new brand of small-room underground clubbing named M.B.T.S.(Most Below The Surface).

=== Personal life ===
Jesse Houk currently lives in Brooklyn, New York.

== Discography ==
=== Albums ===
- Extended Engagement (2003)
- Simmer (2004)
- Mega Scum! 01 (2006)
- A Place Where We Belong (2011)
- In Case We're All Still Here (2013)
- The Collection 2021 (2021)

=== Singles ===
- 1997 The Watersong
- 2000 Learning To Fly
- 2001 We Love You
- 2002 Loving The Alien (with David Bowie)
- 2002 Deep Sleep Dub (with Michael Moog)
- 2002 Music Revolution
- 2004 Simmer
- 2004 Come On
- 2005 Let The Sun Shine (with Cevin Fisher)
- 2006 Like Paradise (with Cevin Fisher)
- 2006 Secret (with Sarah Tancer)
- 2006 Dirty Extra
- 2006 Beat As One
- 2007 Chicks For Free
- 2007 I Remember
- 2007 Serenade (with Tommy Vee)
- 2007 Hear Me
- 2008 Stereo & Video (with D:Fuse)
- 2008 Into The Deep (with Static Revenger and David Gausa)
- 2009 Escape (with Polina)
- 2009 Sandia
- 2009 How Does It Feel (with Tommy Vee & Static Revenger)
- 2010 Undone
- 2010 Showtime
- 2011 All Go Down (with Davey La)
- 2011 Illusion
- 2011 Don't Give Up (with Vassy)
- 2011 In Love
- 2012 Schroeder In Wonderland
- 2012 Running
- 2012 Clones/Middle Earth
- 2013 Lost Your Number
- 2013 Dionysian
- 2013 Downtown
- 2014 Wave2
- 2015 Send Wave
- 2015 The Woods
- 2015 Hideout
- 2015 Spin
- 2015 Chemiquamour
- 2017 Your Fortune Awaits
- 2019 Antarctica
- 2020 Tiny Little Human
- 2022 X Injury
- 2024 Life Blood / Life Groove

=== Remixes ===
- 1999 First Choice - The Player
- 2000 Danny Morales - The Fiend
- 2001 Boris Dlugosch - Never Enough
- 2001 Sono - Keep Control
- 2001 Milk & Honey - You, Me & The Music
- 2002 Mr. Hermano - Free As The Morning Sun
- 2002 George Michael - Freeek
- 2002 Milo - Jungle Of Mirrors
- 2002 Roger Goode - In The Beginning
- 2002 New Order - Here To Stay
- 2002 Kylie Minogue - Love At First Sight
- 2002 Dirty Vegas - Days Go By
- 2002 Eclipse 29 - You're Not Alone
- 2002 iiO - At The End
- 2003 Tomas vs. Filterheadz - Sunshine
- 2003 Pure Orange - Feel Alive
- 2003 Monica - So Gone
- 2003 Lucy Woodward - Blindsided
- 2003 Planet Funk - The Switch
- 2003 Annie Lennox - Pavement Cracks
- 2003 Double Dee - Shining
- 2003 Dutch feat. Crystal Waters - My Time
- 2003 Skin - Faithfulness
- 2003 Jewel - Stand
- 2003 Kristine W - Fly Again
- 2003 Enrique Iglesias - Addicted
- 2003 Dido - White Flag
- 2004 Missy Elliott - Pass That Dutch
- 2004 Spawn Blond - Waterfalls
- 2004 Murk - Time
- 2004 Nars - Dope Dope Dope
- 2004 Amiel - Love Song
- 2004 Britney Spears - Everytime
- 2004 Utada - Devil Inside
- 2004 Slacker - Best Boyfriend
- 2005 Cevin Fisher & The Scumfrog - Let The Sun Shine
- 2005 M-Flo - I Wanna Be Down
- 2005 Fantasia - It's All Good
- 2005 Squat 84 - Say No
- 2005 Chocolate Puma - 4 Letter Word
- 2005 Rob Thomas - Lonely No More
- 2005 Robbie Rivera - Some Kind Of Heaven
- 2005 Annie - Heartbeat
- 2005 Missy Elliott - Lose Control
- 2005 Rob Thomas - This Is How A Heart Breaks
- 2005 Dutch feat. Lisa Fischer - (Why Should I) Think About The Rain
- 2005 Emilia - Back To Me
- 2006 Static Revenger - So High
- 2006 Astro & Glyde - I Know What You Like
- 2006 Kelis - Bossy
- 2006 Paris Hilton - Stars Are Blind
- 2006 Syke & Sugerstarr - Are You Watching Me
- 2006 Simple Minds - Different World
- 2006 Static Revenger - So High
- 2006 Zum Schneider - Crazy
- 2007 Tommy Vee feat. The Scumfrog - I Would Die For You
- 2007 Gaby & The Scumfrog - Broken Disco
- 2007 Rafael Frost - Run To You
- 2007 Meck feat. Dino - Feels Like Home
- 2007 Cupid - Cupid Shuffle
- 2008 Dr. Kucho! - Groover's Delight
- 2008 Static Revenger & Love Song Surprise - Satellite
- 2009 Peter Gelderblom - Lost
- 2009 Nadia Ali - Love Story
- 2009 Franklin Fuentes - The Robots (Are Coming!)
- 2009 The Singhs - Beautiful Thing
- 2009 IAM ONE - Missy
- 2009 Polina - Shotguns
- 2010 Victoria Aitken - Sunshine
- 2010 Tommy Vee & Mauro Ferrucci - Old Skool Generation
- 2010 Natalia Flores - Going Strong
- 2010 Geoffery Paris - Money! & What!
- 2010 (Never Mind The) Stars - France
- 2010 Mumiy Troll - Polar Bear
- 2011 Dennis Ruyer - A Night At The Opera
- 2011 Tiny Trendies - The Sky Is Not Crying
- 2011 Mason feat. Aqualung - Little Angel
- 2011 Markus Binpafl aka BIG WORLD - Meganite
- 2012 Larry Powers - Aurora Snow
- 2012 Armin Van Buuren - We Are Here To Make Some Noise
- 2013 Methodrone - Stop Start
- 2013 Meandisco & Daniel Wilde - The Day I Set You Free

== See also ==
- List of number-one dance hits (United States)
- List of artists who reached number one on the US Dance chart
