= Ain't No Stoppin' Us Now =

- Dutch/European single picture sleeve

Single by McFadden & Whitehead

from the album McFadden & Whitehead
- B-side: "I Got the Love"
- Released: April 1979
- Recorded: 1978
- Studio: Sigma Sound, Philadelphia, Pennsylvania
- Genre: Disco
- Length: 7:02 (album version); 3:38 (single edit); 10:45 (12-inch version)
- Label: Philadelphia International
- Songwriters: Jerry Cohen; Gene McFadden; John Whitehead
- Producers: Jerry Cohen; Gene McFadden; John Whitehead

McFadden & Whitehead singles chronology
"Ain't No Stoppin' Us Now" (1979)	"I've Been Pushed Aside" (1979)

Alternative release(s)
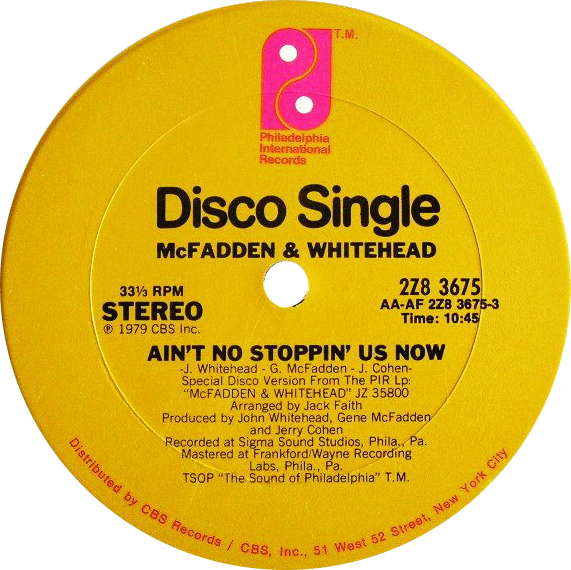
- Side A of the US 12-inch vinyl single

Audio
- "Ain't No Stoppin' Us Now" on YouTube

"Ain't No Stoppin' Us Now" is a 1979 disco song performed by American R&B duo McFadden & Whitehead, from their debut album McFadden & Whitehead (1979). They wrote and produced the song along with keyboard player Jerry Cohen.

== Background ==
"Ain't No Stoppin' Us Now" is about succeeding despite having faced previous disadvantages ("so many things that held us down"). It was widely interpreted to be about the experience of the African American community. After it gained popularity, it was often referred to as "the new black national anthem" (the original being the 1900 song "Lift Every Voice and Sing").

Kelefa Sanneh noted the song was, "an exuberant number often interpreted as an expression of Black pride". He also noted that the authors of the song were in a dispute over royalties with their record label Philadelphia International. Singer Whitehead said, "If anything, the song was a declaration of our independence from Gamble."

== Production ==
Although the song was taken as social commentary, in an interview conducted by Philadelphia video producer Bob Lott, Whitehead and McFadden revealed that the song expressed their frustration with Philadelphia International owners Kenny Gamble and Leon Huff. For many years the pair were encouraged to remain as house songwriters and not performers. Gamble has confirmed that upon first hearing "Ain't No Stoppin' Us Now", he tried unsuccessfully to convince McFadden and Whitehead to give the song to the O'Jays. He believed it was better for them to write and produce for the prominent recording artists of the day than to try to compete with them as on-stage performers.

This song features a female chorus in the repeated refrain. Electronic beeping feedback sounds are heard towards the ending of the longer version of the song.

== Chart performance ==
Released as the lead single from the album, the song spent a week at number one on the R&B singles chart. It also proved to be a successful crossover hit, peaking at number 13 on the Billboard Hot 100. The single also made it to number 10 on the disco charts, and reached number 5 in the UK. It eventually went double Platinum for selling 2 million copies.

== Cover versions ==
In 1995, Luther Vandross released his version of the song, which charted in the UK at number 22 and in New Zealand at number 50. His version of the song was also performed as a duet with British girl group the Spice Girls for their An Audience with... special on the UK channel ITV1 in 1997. It later appeared as a B-side to their single "Stop".

== Samples ==
The bassline of the track was used in Ma quale idea by Italian singer-songwriter Pino D'Angiò, although he claimed he wrote that bassline himself.

== Personnel ==
- Gene McFadden – lead vocals
- John Whitehead – lead vocals
- Jerry Cohen – keyboards
- Dennis Harris – guitar
- Bobby Eli – guitar
- Jimmie Williams – bass
- Keith Benson – drums
- Barbara Ingram, Carla Benson, Evette Benton – backing vocals
- Don Renaldo And His String & Horn Sections – orchestral accompaniment

== Charts ==
=== Weekly charts ===
1979 chart performance for "Ain't No Stoppin' Us Now"
Chart (1979)	Peak position
Australia (Kent Music Report)	56
Canada Top Singles (RPM)	25
Ireland (IRMA)	9
UK Singles (OCC)	5
US Billboard Hot 100	13
US Billboard Hot Soul Singles (Billboard)	1
US Billboard Disco (Billboard)	10
US Cash Box Top 100	12

2025 chart performance for "Ain't No Stoppin' Us Now"
Chart (2025)	Peak position
Jamaica Airplay (JAMMS)	9

=== Year-end charts ===
Year-end performance for "Ain't No Stoppin' Us Now"
Chart (1979)	Rank
Canada Top Singles (RPM)	169
UK Singles (OCC)	53
US Billboard Hot 100	65
US Cash Box	82

== Certifications ==
Region	Certification	Certified units/sales
United Kingdom (BPI)	Silver	250,000^{^}
United States (RIAA)	Platinum	2,000,000^{^}
^{^} Shipments figures based on certification alone.
