= Into the Nightlife =

Single by Cyndi Lauper

from the album Bring Ya to the Brink
- Released: August 8, 2008
- Recorded: 2007
- Genre: Dance-pop; Euro disco
- Length: 4:00
- Label: Epic
- Songwriters: Cyndi Lauper; Peer Åström; Johan Bobäck; Max Martin
- Producers: Lauper; Åström; Bobäck

Cyndi Lauper singles chronology
"Same Ol' Story" (2008)	"Into the Nightlife" (2008)	"A Christmas Duel" (2008)

Music video
- "Into the Nightlife" on YouTube

"Into the Nightlife" is a song by American singer Cyndi Lauper for her tenth studio album Bring Ya to the Brink (2008). It was written by Lauper, Peer Åström, Johan Bobäck and Max Martin, and produced by Lauper, Åström and Bobäck. It peaked at number one on the US Billboard Hot Dance Club Play and on the Cashbox Top Dance Singles. It became Lauper's first Australian chart single in fourteen years.

In an interview with Entertainment Weekly, Lauper says that the song title was inspired by Henry Miller's book Into the Night Life that inspired Lawrence Ferlinghetti's A Coney Island of the Mind, which inspired her to describe the images of nightlife in New York City.

The single was released to UK radio stations early September 2008. As of August 2008, the song has sold 16,000 downloads in the United States. It was a dance hit and the Soul Seekers Club Mix of "Into the Nightlife" is featured as the third track on the annual collection of dance songs Ministry Of Sound released in 2009.

== Music video ==
The music video for the song which was directed by Lauper herself and produced by 44 Productions was partly filmed at Splash Bar in New York City on 20 May 2008. Fans were invited to come be extras in the video.

Ari Gold and Colton Ford appear in the video dancing behind Lauper in the night club. Lucas Silveira appears kissing an unidentified woman in the club.

== Official mixes ==
- Album version – 4:00
- Jody Den Broeder Club Mix – 7:19
- Jody Den Broeder Dub – 7:49
- Jody Den Broeder Mixshow – 5:08
- Jody Den Broeder Radio Mix – 4:03
- Soul Seekerz Dub – 7:41
- Soul Seekerz Radio Mix – 3:52
- Soul Seekerz Vocal Club Mix – 7:41
- Johnny Pinkfinger vs Mihell Remix - 7:36 #
- Freedomebunch Mix - 7:46 #
1. From the Floor Remixes album

== Charts ==
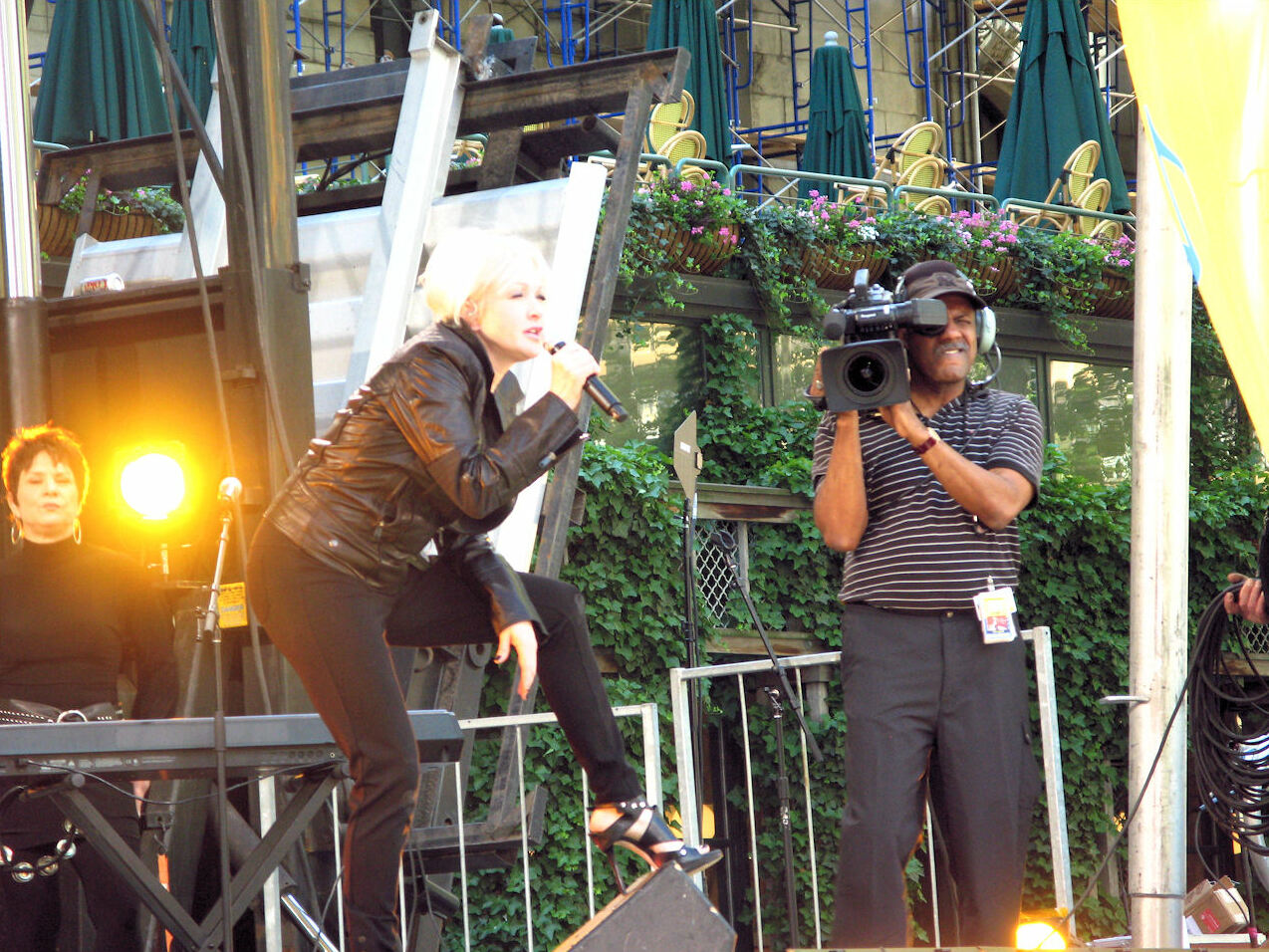
Lauper performing the song at Good Morning America in 2008

=== Weekly charts ===
Weekly chart performance for "Into the Nightlife"
Chart (2008)	Peak position
Australia (ARIA)	82
Russia (Tophit)	152
Spain (Promusicae)	94
UK Singles (OCC)	168
US Dance Club Songs (Billboard)	1
US Dance Airplay (Billboard)	1
US Global Dance Tracks (Billboard)	18

=== Year-end charts ===
Year-end chart performance for "Into the Nightlife"
Chart (2008)	Position
US Dance Club Songs (Billboard)	48
US Dance/Mix Show Airplay (Billboard)	20

== Release history ==
Region	Date	Format
United Kingdom	September 22, 2008	Paid download; airplay
United States	August 8, 2008	Paid download
