= Same Ol' Story =

Single by Cyndi Lauper

from the album Bring Ya to the Brink
- Released: May 6, 2008
- Recorded: New York City, New York, United States, 2007
- Genre: Dance-pop
- Length: 5:54
- Label: Epic
- Songwriters: Cyndi Lauper; Richard Morel
- Producers: Cyndi Lauper; Richard Morel

Cyndi Lauper singles chronology
"Set Your Heart" (2008)	"Same Ol' Story" (2008)	"Into the Nightlife" (2008)

"Same Ol' Story" (2008) (also known as "Same Ol' Fuckin' Story") is a song by Cyndi Lauper, released as a single from her 2008 album Bring Ya to the Brink. It was written and produced by Lauper and New York City DJ Richard Morel. The song reached #1 on the Billboard Hot Dance Club Play chart, becoming Lauper's first single to top the chart since her 1983 hit "Girl Just Wanna Have Fun".

The song was released on the iTunes Store and Amazon.com on May 6, 2008.

There is also a "clean version" available on iTunes which replaces the lyrics "Same ol' fucking story" with "Same ol', same ol' story". As of August 2009, the song has sold 5,000 downloads in the U.S.

== Official mixes ==
- Richard Morel Clean Original Mix Acapella – 5:42
- Richard Morel Explicit Original Mix – 5:54
- Richard Morel Clean Original Mix – 5:54
- Richard Morel Extended Original Mix – 8:37
- Ralphi Rosario Vocal Mix – 8:43
- Ralphi Rosario Clean Vocal Mix - 8:44 (unreleased)
- Ralphi Rosario Filter Dub – 9:17
- Ralphi Rosario Radio Mix - 3:52 (unreleased)
- Razor N Guido Vocal Mix – 9:30
- Razor N Guido Dub - 6:31 (unreleased)
- Richard Morel Extended Original Dub – 7:49
- Richard Morel Deep Dub – 8:57
- Rosabel Vocal Mix – 9:43
- Rosabel Clean Vocal Mix - 9:44 (unreleased)

== Charts ==
=== Weekly charts ===
Weekly chart performance for "Same Ol' Story"
Chart (2008)	Peak position
Russia (Tophit)	219
US Dance Club Songs (Billboard)	1
US Global Dance Tracks (Billboard)	27
US Hot Singles Sales (Billboard)	49
