= Cary Gilbert =

American songwriter

- Born: March 20, 1942; United States
- Died: February 15, 1993 (aged 50) United States
- Genres: R&B
- Occupations: Lyricist, composer
- Label: Philadelphia International Records

Cary Gilbert (March 20, 1942; February 15, 1993) was an American lyricist who wrote songs with Kenneth Gamble and Leon Huff at Philadelphia International Records in the 1970s. Among the songs he co-wrote are the international number one hits "Me and Mrs. Jones" and "Don't Leave Me This Way".

== Biography ==
Gilbert, widely known as "Hippy", grew up in Camden, New Jersey, and befriended with Gamble and Huff when the two were members of "Kenny Gamble & the Romeos. After holding several jobs and marrying, Gilbert turned to songwriting with Gamble and Huff and penned the lyrics for Billy Paul's hit "Me and Mrs. Jones" in 1972. He also wrote the lyrics for Don't Leave Me This Way, originally a track on Harold Melvin & the Blue Notes' 1975 album Wake Up Everybody and later an international hit for Thelma Houston, released in 1976 and whose version was nominated for Best R&B Song at the 1978 Grammy Awards. In 1986, the song was covered by British synth-pop duo The Communards. Gilbert also co-wrote "Livin' for the Weekend" and "Your Body's Here With Me (But Your Mind Is on the Other Side of Town)" for The O'Jays, "Don't Let the Music Slip Away" for Archie Bell & the Drells, and "Let's Clean Up the Ghetto" for the Philadelphia International All-Stars.

Gilbert died in February 1993, at age 50, from complications associated with diabetes.
