= Hope That We Can Be Together Soon =

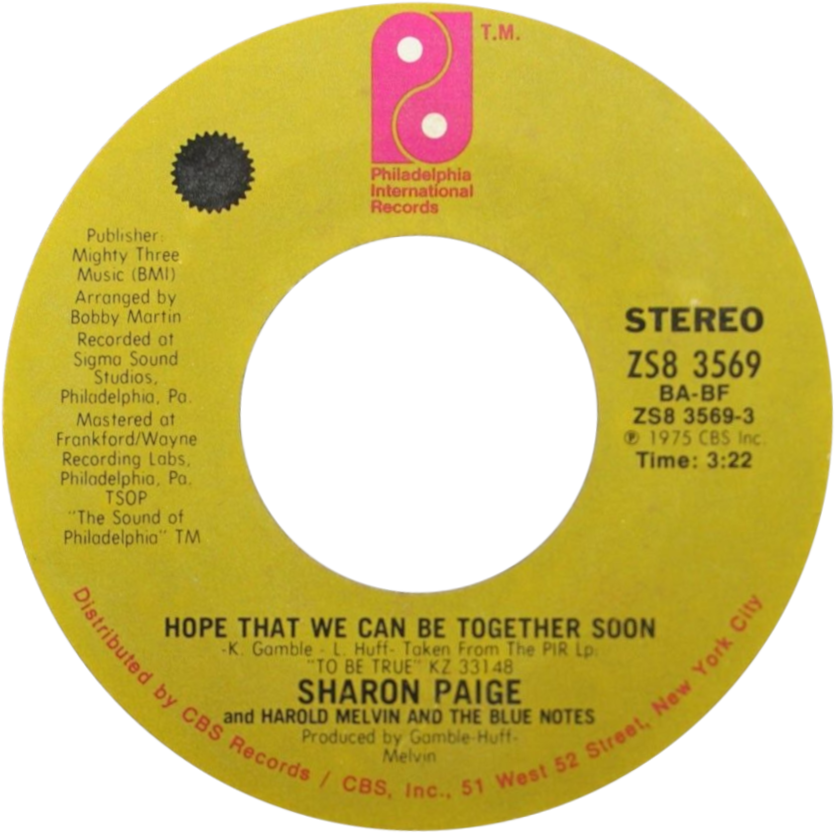
- Side A of the US single

Single by Sharon Paige & Harold Melvin & the Blue Notes

from the album To Be True
- B-side: "Be for Real"
- Released: June 1975
- Studio: Sigma Sound, Philadelphia, Pennsylvania
- Genre: R&B/Soul
- Length: 3:22
- Label: Philadelphia International
- Songwriter(s): Kenneth Gamble & Leon Huff
- Producer(s): Kenneth Gamble, Leon Huff & Harold Melvin

Sharon Paige & Harold Melvin & the Blue Notes singles chronology
"Bad Luck" (1975)	"Hope That We Can Be Together Soon" (1975)	"Wake Up Everybody" (1975)

"Hope That We Can Be Together Soon" is a song written by Kenneth Gamble and Leon Huff, which was originally recorded by Dusty Springfield as "Let's Get Together Soon" for her 1970 album, A Brand New Me. The track was produced by Gamble and Huff.

== 1975 cover version ==
The composition scored a hit when it was released by Sharon Paige and Harold Melvin & the Blue Notes in 1975. Unlike most of the group's singles from this time period, Melvin handles most of the vocal duties, while Teddy Pendergrass appears for one line and the closing part of the song. Paige took on a more prominent role in the group after Pendergrass left the group for a solo career.

== Chart performance ==
Released in 1975 from the album To Be True, it reached number one on the Hot Soul Singles chart in the summer of that year. It reached number 42 on the Billboard Hot 100.

== Charts ==
Chart (1975)	Peak position
U.S. Billboard Hot 100	42
U.S. Billboard Hot Soul Singles	1
