= Richard Morel =

American singer

Richard Morel is an American singer-songwriter, DJ, remixer and record producer from the suburbs of Boston, Massachusetts. He has worked extensively with Washington D.C.–based duo Deep Dish, co-writing, co-producing, performing and singing on many of their tracks, most notably on their albums Junk Science and George Is On. Richard Morel's songs are represented by Downtown Music Publishing.

== Dance music ==
As a dance music producer and remixer, he has released an extensive number of club hits using the names Morel and Pink Noise. Notable artists he has provided remixes for include Mariah Carey, t.A.T.u., Pet Shop Boys, Tina Turner, New Order, Depeche Mode, Filter, Yoko Ono, Seal, The Killers, Blaqk Audio and Amanda Lear.

== Record label ==
In 1995 Morel started his own independent record label called Outsider Music. He released "Peterbilt Angel" and the "4-Track" CDs on Outsider. Morel has collaborated with Ute Lemper and Daniel Ash for Outsider Music releases. In 2007 Michael Alago (A+R maverick who signed Metallica and White Zombie) began working with Morel at Outsider Music.

In 2002 he released Queen Of the Highway on Deep Dish's Yoshitoshi label. The album, which contained not only house music tracks but also had modern rock, pop and hip-hop elements throughout, impressed many critics. Queen Of the Highway is an audio portrait of punk photographer Mark Morrisroe whom Morel befriended. The autobiographical and introspective lyrics helped to earn the album its critical praise. Included on the record are some of his past club hits: "True (The Faggot Is You)," "Funny Car (Love Is Dead)" and "Cabaret." Technically, the album is released by a band also called Morel, fronted by Richard.

== Dance events ==
Also in 2002, he began running a monthly dance event in Washington, DC with friend and veteran punk/alternative/indie icon Bob Mould, titled Blowoff. The Blowoff dance event was so popular that it spurred Blowoff events in other cities such as New York City, Chicago, and San Diego. Blowoff is also the name of an electronic duo that Morel and Mould have been recording an album under.

After several more club hits and remixes, Morel returned with a second album, Lucky Strike, in 2004. Again praised by critics, the follow-up was an extension of sounds and lyrical content of his first. Included here are his club hits "If You Love Me," "Under a Disco" and "Escape (Driving To Heaven)," a collaboration with producer 16B.

== Touring unit ==
In 2005, Morel became part of Bob Mould's new touring unit (along with another notable DC musician, Fugazi drummer Brendan Canty), formed to support the release of Mould's Body of Song album. Morel also contributed remixes of the track "(Shine Your) Light Love Hope" to the bonus disc included in the limited-edition version of the album.

== Collaborations ==
Morel co-produced and co-wrote several songs with Cyndi Lauper for her 2008 album Bring Ya to the Brink including the Billboard Hot Dance Club Play No. 1 single "Same Ol' Story".

In 2010, Richard Morel produced Amanda Lear's new EP I'm Coming Up. Morel is openly gay.

== Discography ==
=== Albums ===
- Peterbilt Angel (1995)
- Four-Track (1997)
- Queen of the Highway (2002), Yoshitoshi
- Lucky Strike (2004), Yoshitoshi
- Blowoff (2006)
- The Death of the Paperboy (2008)

=== Singles ===
- "Flawed" (2008)
- "If You Love Me" (2005)
- "Stoning Of Steven" (2004)
- "Cabaret" (2003)
- "Funny Car" (2002)
- "Dreaming of LA" (2001)
- "Wake-Up" (1998)
- "True (The Faggot Is You)" (1998)

=== Collaborations ===
[with Deep Dish]

- "Mohammad is Jesus..." (2011)
- "Everybody Is Wearing My Head" (2008)
- "Stranded" (2007)
- "Sacramento" (2005)
- "George Is On" (2005)
- "Junk Science" (1998)

[with 16B]

- "Escape (Driving To Heaven)" (2001)

[with Tom Goss]

- "Bears" (2013)

=== Remixes ===
[as Pink Noise]

- Kerli "The Lucky Ones" (2012)
- Yoko Ono "She Gets Down On Her Knees" (2012)
- Frankmusik "No I.D." (2011)
- Yoko Ono "Move on Fast" (2011)
- Yoko Ono "Wouldnit (I'm a Star) (2010)
- Amanda Lear "I'm Coming Up" (2010)
- Cyndi Lauper "Same Ol' Story" (2008) [No. 1 Billboard's Club Play Chart]
- Cyndi Lauper "Set Your Heart" (2008)
- Yoko Ono "You're the One" (2007)
- Cyndi Lauper "True Colors" (2007)
- eMpulse "American Idle" (2007)
- Blaqk Audio "Stiff Kittens" (2007)
- t.A.T.u. "Friend or Foe" (2006)
- Stellastarr "Sweet Troubled Soul" (2006)
- Coldfeet "Boom, Clang" (2006)
- Nelly Furtado "Promiscuous"
- The Killers "All these things That I've Done" (2005)
- Leela James "Music" (2005)
- Vivian Green "Tired" (2005) [No. 1 Billboard's Club Play Chart]
- Esthero "Fast Lane" (2005)
- New Order "Krafty" (2005) [No. 2 Billboard's Club play Chart]
- Le Tigre "After Dark" (2005)
- Seal "Killer"(2005) [No. 1 Billboard's Club Play Chart]
- Luke Wan "The Wish" (2004)
- Pretenders "Time " (2003)
- Pink "Get The Party Started"
- Yoko Ono "Give Me Something"(2003)
- Mariah Carey "The One" (2003)
- t.A.T.u. "Not Gonna Get Us" (2003) [No. 1 Billboard's Club Play Chart]
- Clare Quilty "Tremble" (2003)
- Daniel Ash "Burning Man" (2002)
- Filter "Where Do We Go From Here" (2002)
- Jade Anderson "Sugarhigh" (2002)
- Lydia Rhodes "Dreams" (2002)
- Bernard Leon Howard III feat. 80 "Marscarter" (2002)
- Lo-Fidelity All-Stars "Sleeping Faster" (2001)
- Ananda Project feat. Heather Johnson "Breaking Down" (2001)
- The Collaboration (Peter Rauhofer + Pet Shop Boys) "Break 4 Love" (2001) [No. 1 Billboard's Club Play Chart]
- Depeche Mode "Dream On" (2001) [No. 1 Billboard's Club Play Chart]
- New Order "True Faith" (2001)
- David J. "Mickey Rourke Blues" (2000)
- Orgy "Opticon" (2000)
- Ali Damisi "Begin 2 Rise" (2000)
- Clare Quilty "Secret Sharer" (1999)
- Clare Quilty "Roses" (1999)
- Divine Comedy "Marvelous Party" (1997)
- Pet Shop Boys "Se a vida é (That's the Way Life Is)" (1996)
- Tina Turner "Wildest Dreams" (1996)
