= A New Flame (song) =

Single by Simply Red

from the album A New Flame
- Released: 26 June 1989
- Length: 3:57
- Label: Elektra; WEA
- Songwriter: Mick Hucknall
- Producer: Stewart Levine

Simply Red singles chronology
"If You Don't Know Me by Now" (1989)	"A New Flame" (1989)	"You've Got It" (1989)

Music video
- "A New Flame" on YouTube

"A New Flame" is a song by the British soul and pop band Simply Red, released in June 1989 by Elektra and WEA as the third single from the band's third studio album by the same name (1989). The song was written by Mick Hucknall and produced by Stewart Levine. It was a top-20 hit in the UK, peaking at number 17 on the UK Singles Chart, and reached the top 30 in Ireland, the Netherlands, and New Zealand. Vaughan Arnell and Anthea Benton directed its accompanying music video.

== Critical reception ==
Pan-European magazine Music & Media named the song Single of the Week in July 1989, adding, "Most of the time Simply Red produce material that is primarily a vehicle for singer Mick Hucknall's undoubted vocal talents and really little else. This song, though, is different. A great dance beat and a strong arrangement support a song that recalls the best days of Motown, while at the same time it sounds thoroughly modern. Credit for this goes to Stewart Levine's production and a restrained performance by the band." Mike Soutar from Smash Hits wrote, "'A New Flame' is pretty much as you'd expect it to sound, i.e. Mick Hucknall proves he's got a fine set of pipes, it's perfectly pleasant and not much else. A hit. But not for very long."

== Track listing ==
- 7", UK (1989)
1. "A New Flame"
2. "More"
- 12", UK (1989)
1. "A New Flame"
2. "More"
3. "I Asked Her for Water" (Live)
4. "Resume" (Live)
- CD mini, Europe (1989)
1. "A New Flame" – 3:57
2. "More" – 4:06
3. "I Asked Her for Water" (Live) – 5:52
4. "Resume" (Live) – 4:05

== Charts ==
Chart (1989)	Peak position
Australia (ARIA)	48
Belgium (Ultratop 50 Flanders)	33
Europe (Eurochart Hot 100)	55
France (SNEP)	43
Ireland (IRMA)	28
Israel (Israeli Singles Chart)	14
Italy Airplay (Music & Media)	11
Luxembourg (Radio Luxembourg)	10
Netherlands (Dutch Top 40)	27
Netherlands (Single Top 100)	31
New Zealand (Recorded Music NZ)	22
UK Singles (OCC)	17
West Germany (Official German Charts)	55
