= Reaching for the World =

Studio album by Harold Melvin & the Blue Notes
- Released: 1977
- Studios: Sigma Sound, Philadelphia, Pennsylvania
- Genre: R&B/Soul
- Label: ABC Records
- Producer: Harold Melvin

Harold Melvin & the Blue Notes chronology
Collectors' Item: All Their Greatest Hits! (1976)	Reaching for the World (1977)	Now is the Time (1977)

Professional ratings
Review scores
Source	Rating
Allmusic	3/5 stars

Reaching for the World is the fifth album by American vocal group Harold Melvin & the Blue Notes. This, their debut album for the ABC Records label, was recorded in 1976 and released in 1977. This is the first album without Teddy Pendergrass, David Ebo was his replacement. Also joining the Blue Notes were Dwight Johnson and William Spratley. On release it reached #56 in the US Billboard 200 and #15 on the US R&B Charts. The lead single was "Reaching For The World" which reached #74 on the US Billboard 100 and #6 on the US R&B Charts. Then "After You Love Me, Why Do You Leave Me", featuring Sharon Paige, reached #102 in the US Billboard 100 and #15 on the US R&B Charts. "Hostage Parts 1 & 2" was chosen as the final single, but failed to chart.

== Track listing ==
Side 1

1. "Reaching for the World" (Derek Floyd) – 4:24
2. "Where There’s a Will - There’s a Way" (Harold J. Melvin, Melvin Steele, Mervin Steele) – 4:04
3. "After You Love Me, Why Do You Leave Me" (Harold J. Melvin, Kenny Gamble) – 4:42
4. "Sandman" (Hubert V. Yarborough) – 4:25

Side 2

1. "Hostage Part 1 & 2" (Hubert V. Yarborough) – 6:30
2. "He Loves You and I Do Too" (Harold J. Melvin) – 3:37
3. "Big Singing Star" (Harold J. Melvin) - 3:33
4. "Stay Together" (John Whitehead, Gene McFadden, Victor Carstarphen) – 5:00

== Production ==
- Producer: Harold Melvin for Million Dollar Records
- Recorded at Sigma Sound Studios, Philadelphia
- Engineers: Jim Gallagher and Art Stoppe
- Assistant Engineers: Peter Humphreys, Jeffrey Stewart, Carla Bandini and Jim Dougherty
- Album Art Direction: Frank Mulvey and Earl Klasky
- Album Design: Stan Evenson
