= Ellie Lawson =

Ellie Lawson is a British folk and electronic dance music singer-songwriter. Born in Croydon, South London she has released 5 albums and 2 EPs with 2 albums released by Amsterdam Trance records and Raz Nitzan music including producers Ferry Corsten, Richard Durand, 4 Strings and supported regularly on ASOT by Armin Van Buuren.

Lawson was an ambassador for the clothing brand Quiksilver for 5 years 2008–2013 and toured Quiksilver stores in the UK and Ireland as part of her sponsorship deal. She was previously signed with Atlantic Records in the USA with her debut album and was championed by Ellen DeGeneres, who said live on air "I play her music over and over again in my house, she will be a huge star".

On her debut album The Philosophy Tree, Lawson has tracks produced by William Orbit and DJ Lethal, who signed her to his production company alongside lawyer/publishing head/manager David Mantel for her first album, The Philosophy Tree. She was previously managed for 2 years by Launch metrics CEO Eddie Mullon and Kerri Savage.

She has her own record label called 'Create Your Own Reality' and previously sold 25,000 records exclusively with the US book retailer Barnes & Noble. Lawson's performances include opening for the BBC presenter Jimmy Doherty's festival where KT Tunstall and José González headlined, the Abbey Road Studios as part of the Brit Awards, Sundance film festival, Relentless Boardmasters festival and Brixton Academy to a 5000 Trance audience.

Her 5 track EP 'Insights' was produced by producer and Communion records Co-founder Ian Grimble. (Mumford & sons, Benjamin Francis Leftwich, Daughter) which features Harp, Double Bass and other live instrumentation and was featured on the UK iTunes home page.

Ellie Lawson released the song For You with Stoneface and Terminal written about her son, born in 2013. She has since released 10 songs all reaching the Beatport Trance Charts.

== Discography ==
- The Philosophy Tree, 2005 Physical copies still available at www.ellielawson.com
- "Lost Songs", 2009 iTunes and www.ellielawson.com
- "Lost Without You EP", 2011 iTunes and www.ellielawson.com
- "Safe From Harm", 2010 4 Strings, (File, MP3, 320), Liquid Recordings,
- "Wide Awake", 2011 Richard Durand, Magik Muzik,
- "Place in the Sun", 2011 Menno De Jong, Intuition Recordings,
- Lost Without You EP, 2011 iTunes and www.ellielawson.com
- "A Day Without Rain", 2012 Ferry Corsten, Flashover Recordings,
- Breaking Through, 2012 Stoneface & Terminal, Euphonic,
- Insights EP 2012 iTunes and www.ellielawson.com
- Collected 2012 Trance/EDM album on iTunes and Beatport
- Resonate 2013 album iTunes and www.ellielawson.com
- The best of Ellie Lawson 2018 on all digital platforms
- Becoming 2020 Album on all platforms
