= Clare Quilty (group) =

American musical group

Clare Quilty was an American musical group formed in Charlottesville, Virginia, in the United States, in 1994. Clare Quilty began as a pop-punk band but later material veered more toward electronica and trip hop. The band is named after a character in Vladimir Nabokov's 1955 novel, Lolita.

The group scored two chart hits in 2003, "Dex Dubious" (DBC Mix) (US #33 Club Play) and "Tremble" (US #44 Club Play).

Clare Quilty's final album, Face the Strange, was produced by Richard Morel and was released by DCide Records in summer 2005. The band retired in January 2006.

== Band members ==
- Jenn Rhubright – vocals
- Michael Rodi – guitar, vocals
- Chris Ruotolo – bass, vocals
- Juliet Trail – keyboards, vocals
- Jimmy J. Amburgey – drums

== Discography ==
- Suga-Lik (November 4, 1997)
- Strong (May 9, 2000)
- Face the Strange (June 7, 2005)
