= Harold Melvin =

American singer (1939–1997)

- Born: June 25, 1939; Philadelphia, Pennsylvania, US
- Died: March 24, 1997 (aged 57) Philadelphia, Pennsylvania, US
- Genres: Soul
- Instrument: Vocals
- Years active: 1956–1997
- Formerly of: Harold Melvin & the Blue Notes

Harold James Melvin (June 25, 1939 — March 24, 1997) was an American singer. He is best known for fronting Harold Melvin & the Blue Notes, who were regarded as pioneers in the Philadelphia sound of the 1970s.

== Biography ==
Melvin was born in Philadelphia on June 25, 1939. He sang with his school friends on street corners; this group of friends then became Harold Melvin & the Blue Notes. The group would not have their first hit until the early 1970s, with "If You Don't Know Me by Now". "If You Don't Know Me by Now" and "The Love I Lost" were both certified gold in the US. Melvin fronted the Blue Notes until July 1996.

Melvin had five children (two daughters and three sons) with his wife, Ovelia McDaniels. While he was planning a tour in Japan, he suffered a stroke in July 1996 that ended his career and left him bedridden and unable to speak. Melvin died on March 24, 1997, aged 57. His doctor, Dale Sinker, claimed that he probably died from either suffering another stroke or the long term health effects of his previous stroke.
