= Gil Saunders =

American singer (1952–2021)

Gil Saunders (1952 – February 4, 2021) was an American soul singer who came to fame as lead singer with Harold Melvin & the Blue Notes.

== Biography ==
Saunders was born in Philadelphia and sang in church from an early age. He developed his style after David Ruffin of The Temptations and Marvin Junior of The Dells and, encouraged by family and friends, pursued a career in music. He formed his first group as a teenager, which eventually merged into a neighborhood act called New Day. During a live performance, he was noticed by the Philadelphia singer, songwriter and producer Harold Melvin. Following a tour of England, Melvin recruited Saunders, in 1982, to replace then lead singer David Ebo in his group Harold Melvin & The Blue Notes.

They toured extensively overseas with acts like Billy Paul and The Three Degrees. During a London concert performance, Saunders was introduced as the new lead singer of Harold Melvin & Blue Notes. In 1984, Saunders sang lead on the international dance music hit "Today's Your Lucky Day" from the Harold Melvin & The Blue Notes' album Talk It Up (Tell Everybody).

The album produced three Billboard R&B chart hits, "Today's Your Lucky Day", "Don't Give Me Up" and "I Really Love You". Saunders was also co-lead with Melvin on the track "What We Both Need (Is Love)" which was popular on the local Philadelphia radio station WDAS-FM.

The Talk It Up (Tell Everybody) album was recorded at Alpha International Studios in Philadelphia. The vocal line-up included Saunders with Melvin, Bill Spratley, Dwight "Blackey" Johnson and Rufus Thorne. The video for "Today's Your Lucky Day" which featured the female vocalist Nikko, was filmed at a transformed club in south Philadelphia designed to look like a Las Vegas-style casino.

Saunders recorded and toured with Harold Melvin and the Blue Notes for ten years before pursuing a solo career. His performances with the group were documented in a 1986 P.B.S. television special.

== Discography ==
=== Albums ===
- 1984: Talk It Up (Tell Everybody) (Philly World)

=== Singles ===
With Harold Melvin & The Blue Notes

- 1984: "Don't Give Me Up"
- 1984: "Today's Your Lucky Day"
- 1984: "I Really Love You"

Gil Saunders Solo Singles

- 2007: I Beg You To Stay (Heartfelt/Independent)
- 2007: Christmas (Heartfelt/Independent)
- 2008: "In the Heat", "Let's Turn In", "In My Wildest Dreams" etc.
- 2009: "Yes We Can"
