= Wake Up Everybody (Harold Melvin & the Blue Notes song) =

1975 single by Harold Melvin & the Blue Notes

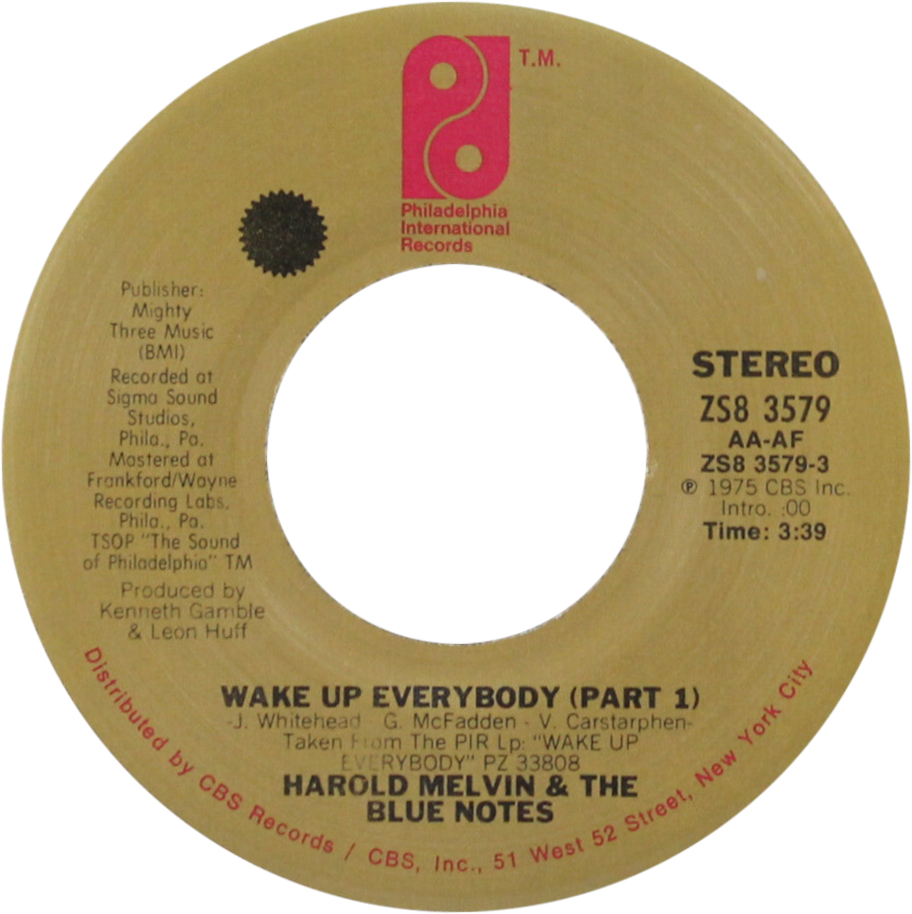
- Part 1 of the US single

Single by Harold Melvin & the Blue Notes

from the album Wake Up Everybody
- A-side: "Wake Up Everybody (Part 1)"
- B-side: "Wake Up Everybody (Part 2)"
- Released: November 1975
- Recorded: 1975
- Studio: Sigma Sound, Philadelphia, Pennsylvania
- Genre: Disco
- Length: 3:39 (Single Version); 7:30 (Full-Length Version)
- Label: Philadelphia International
- Songwriters: John Whitehead; Gene McFadden; Victor Carstarphen
- Producer: Kenneth Gamble & Leon Huff

Harold Melvin & the Blue Notes singles chronology
"Hope That We Can Be Together Soon" (1975)	"Wake Up Everybody" (1975)	"Tell the World How I Feel About 'Cha Baby" (1976)

Music video
- "Wake Up Everybody" on YouTube

"Wake Up Everybody" is an R&B song written by John Whitehead, Gene McFadden and Victor Carstarphen.

== Harold Melvin & the Blue Notes version ==
Originally recorded by Harold Melvin & the Blue Notes, with Teddy Pendergrass singing lead vocals, the song had a somewhat unconventional structure, starting subdued and building slowly to a climax. The title track from their 1975 album, the song spent two weeks at number one on the Hot Soul Singles chart in early 1976. It also enjoyed success on the pop charts, peaking at number 12 on the Billboard Hot 100 chart, number 34 Easy Listening, number 33 in Canada, and number 23 in the UK Singles Chart. They performed the song on Soul Train on November 22, 1975. This version was used in the 1980s in an Ad Council public service announcement advocating for young Americans to join the teaching profession.

=== Weekly charts ===
Chart (1975–1976)	Peak position
Canada RPM Top Singles	33
UK Singles Chart	23
US Billboard Hot 100	12
US Billboard Hot Soul Singles	1
US Billboard Easy Listening	34
US Cash Box Top 100	15

=== Year-end charts ===
Chart (1976)	Rank
US Billboard Hot 100	73

== Sonia version ==
"Wake Up Everybody"

Single by Sonia

from the album Love Train - The Philly Album
- B-side: "Show You the Way to Go"; "Nowhere Left to Hide"
- Released: December 16, 1995
- Genre: R&B; soul
- Length: 3:38
- Label: BMG
- Songwriters: Victor Carstarphen; Gene McFadden; John Whitehead
- Producer: Steve Levine

Sonia singles chronology
"Hopelessly Devoted to You" (1994)	"Wake Up Everybody" (1995)	"Fool for Love" (2009)

"Wake Up Everybody" was covered in 1995 by British singer Sonia. It was produced by Steve Levine for her fourth studio album Love Train - The Philly Album (1998). The song was released as the album's first and final single. This single has two B-sides - "Show You the Way to Go" and "Nowhere Left to Hide". The first B-side appears on Sonia's fourth studio album. This was Sonia's last single until "Fool for Love" in 2009.

=== Track listings ===
CD and cassette

1. "Wake Up Everybody" - 3:38
2. "Show You the Way to Go" - 3:53
3. "Nowhere Left to Hide" - 3:29

== 2004 version ==
"Wake Up Everybody"

Song by various artists

from the album Wake Up Everybody
- Released: 2004
- Genre: R&B; soul; hip hop
- Length: 5:30
- Label: Bungalo Records
- Songwriters: Victor Carstarphen; Gene McFadden; John Whitehead
- Producers: Babyface; Russell Simmons

Music video
- "Wake Up Everybody" on YouTube

In 2004, a cover version was released to coincide with the 2004 presidential election. It features a collection of music stars who urge young people to go out and vote. The song was produced by Babyface, and features various prominent R&B singers and rappers. It was an airplay-only single. Missy Elliott's song "Wake Up" from her album This Is Not a Test! was sampled on this recording. It reached number 19 on the Billboard Bubbling Under R&B/Hip-Hop Songs chart.

=== Artists ===
- Akon
- Ashanti
- Babyface
- Brandy
- Claudette Ortiz
- Eve
- Fabolous
- Faith Evans
- Floetry
- Jadakiss
- Jaheim
- Jamie Foxx
- Jon B
- Keke Palmer
- Marques Houston
- Mary J. Blige
- Miri Ben-Ari
- Missy Elliott
- Monica
- Musiq Soulchild
- Nate Dogg
- Nick Scotti
- Omarion
- Rev Run
- Wyclef Jean

== Other versions ==
"Wake Up Everybody"

Single by John Legend and The Roots featuring Common and Melanie Fiona

from the album Wake Up!
- Released: April 29, 2010; August 6, 2010
- Genre: R&B; soul; hip hop
- Length: 4:26
- Label: Columbia
- Songwriters: Victor Carstarphen; Gene McFadden; John Whitehead
- Producer: The Roots

John Legend singles chronology
"No Other Love" (2009)	"Wake Up Everybody" (2010)	"Heartbreaker" (2010)

The Roots singles chronology
"The Fire" (2010)	"Wake Up Everybody" (2010)	"Hard Times" (2010)

Melanie Fiona singles chronology
"Ay Yo" (2010)	"Wake Up Everybody" (2010)	"Priceless" (2010)

- The song was covered by American singer and actor Nick Scotti. Released as the first single from his self-titled 1993 album, Scotti's version of the song reached #9 on the Billboard Hot Dance Club Play chart in May of that year.
- Rae and Christian featuring Bobby Womack on a 2001 version on their album Sleepwalking.
- Thelma Houston, who had a 1977 #1 with her version of The Blue Notes' "Don't Leave Me This Way", covered "Wake Up Everybody" for her 2007 album A Woman's Touch.
- In 2010, the song was covered by John Legend and The Roots. Also featuring Common, and Melanie Fiona, it was the first single taken from their politically themed album Wake Up!
- A version of the song appears during the opening credits of the 1999 film Life.
- A version of the song appears during the closing credits of the 5th episode of the 2023 TV series Hijack.
- The song was covered by the cast of the musical drama series Star. Their version sampled vocals by Harold Melvin & The Blue Notes & Teddy Pendergrass from the original version.
- Keb' Mo' covered this song on his album Peace - Back By Popular Demand
- A version of the song was used in the Wu-Tang Clan song "A Better Tomorrow."
- French hip hop group Alliance Ethnik used the song as a sample for the song "Wake Up" on their 1999 album "Fat Comeback".

=== Version by John Legend and The Roots featuring Common and Melanie Fiona ===
==== Weekly charts ====
Chart (2010)	Peak position
Belgium (Ultratip Bubbling Under Wallonia)	12
Netherlands (Dutch Top 40)	16
Netherlands (Single Top 100)	21
Switzerland (Schweizer Hitparade)	62
UK Singles (OCC)	179
US Hot R&B/Hip-Hop Songs (Billboard)	53
US Smooth Jazz Airplay (Billboard)	6

==== Year-end charts ====
Chart (2010)	Position
Japan Adult Contemporary (Billboard)	87
Netherlands (Dutch Top 40)	99
