= Bad Luck (Harold Melvin & the Blue Notes song) =

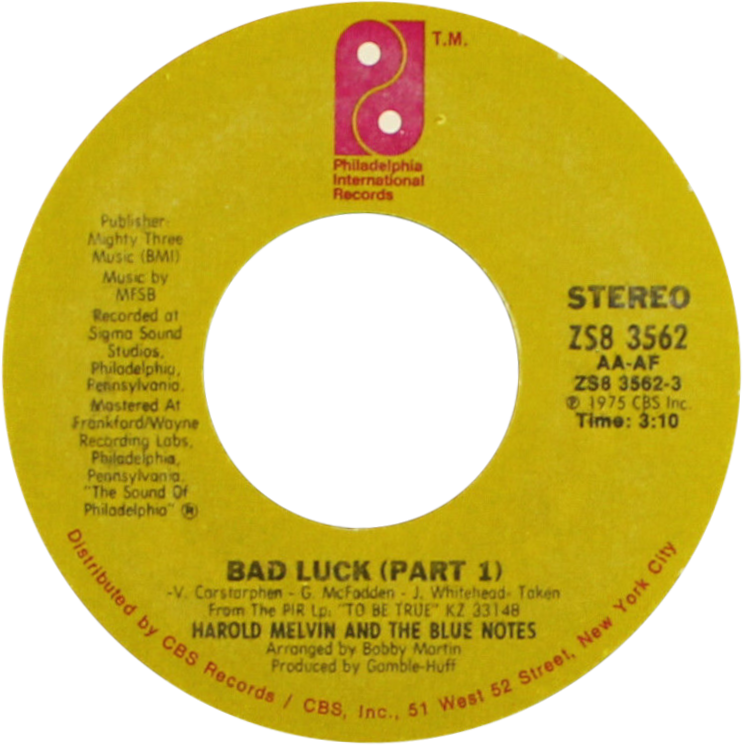
- Side A of the US single

Single by Harold Melvin & the Blue Notes

from the album To Be True
- A-side: "Bad Luck (Part 1)"
- B-side: "Bad Luck (Part 2)"
- Released: February 1975
- Recorded: 1974
- Studio: Sigma Sound, Philadelphia, Pennsylvania
- Genre: Disco; pop; Philadelphia soul
- Length: 3:10 (single version); 6:29 (full-length version)
- Label: Philadelphia International
- Songwriters: Victor Carstarphen, Gene McFadden & John Whitehead
- Producer: Kenneth Gamble and Leon Huff

Harold Melvin & the Blue Notes singles chronology
"Where Are All My Friends" (1974)	"Bad Luck" (1975)	"Hope That We Can Be Together Soon" (1975)

"Bad Luck" is a song recorded by American vocal group Harold Melvin & the Blue Notes from their album To Be True. Released as a single in 1975 by Philadelphia International Records, the song was written by Victor Carstarphen, Gene McFadden, and John Whitehead and produced by Gamble and Huff, with MFSB providing instrumentals. The single was number one on the Billboard Disco Action chart for eleven weeks, also peaking at no. 4 on Hot Soul Singles and no. 15 on the Hot 100. With an unusually loud hi-hat by session drummer Earl Young, "Bad Luck" is considered a signature disco song.

== Development ==
After moving into the former headquarters of Cameo-Parkway Records, Philadelphia International Records began using Cameo-Parkway's old Studio B for recordings in 1974. Sigma Sound Studios audio engineer Joseph Tarsia upgraded Studio B to become an extension of the original Sigma Sound Studios. Among the earliest albums to be recorded at the new Sigma Sound Studios room was To Be True by Harold Melvin & the Blue Notes, including "Bad Luck".

With Harold Melvin & the Blue Notes providing vocals, the ensemble of studio musicians known as MFSB provided the instrumentals, including Earl Young on drums and Ronnie Baker on bass. During the recording sessions, Young's hi-hat was so loud that it could not be quieted in the final mix. The 2004 book A House on Fire: The Rise and Fall of Philadelphia Soul credits this recording error for influencing disco to include loud hi-hats.

== Composition ==
According to the sheet music published by Alfred Music Publishing at MusicNotes.com, "Bad Luck" was composed in the key of A major, with a beat of 120 beats per minute. The vocals range is from E4 to F#5.

During the introduction, the bass utilizes a Mixolydian phrase and syncopation based on an E chord. During the verses, the bass line starts with a basic root fifth octave and expands into a chromatic line.

== Critical reception ==
Reviewing To Be True in the February 8, 1975 issue of Billboard, Tom Moulton compared "Bad Luck" to "TSOP (The Sound of Philadelphia)" and called it "the strongest cut" on the album. In their 1996 book Precious and Few: Pop Music of the Early '70s, Don and Jeff Breithaupt wrote that the bass line on Bad Luck "deserves serious consideration as the best of the PIR era." In a 2003 review for Allmusic, Craig Lytle said the song has "an incessant grooving rhythm where Teddy Pendergrass cuts into the lyric with conviction."

== Chart history ==
=== Weekly charts ===
Chart (1975)	Peak position
Canada RPM Top Singles	29
U.S. Billboard Hot 100	15
U.S. Billboard Hot Soul Singles	4
U.S. Billboard Disco Action chart	1

=== Year-end charts ===
Chart (1975)	Rank
US Opus	92
