= If You Don't Know Me by Now =

1972 single by Harold Melvin & the Blue Notes

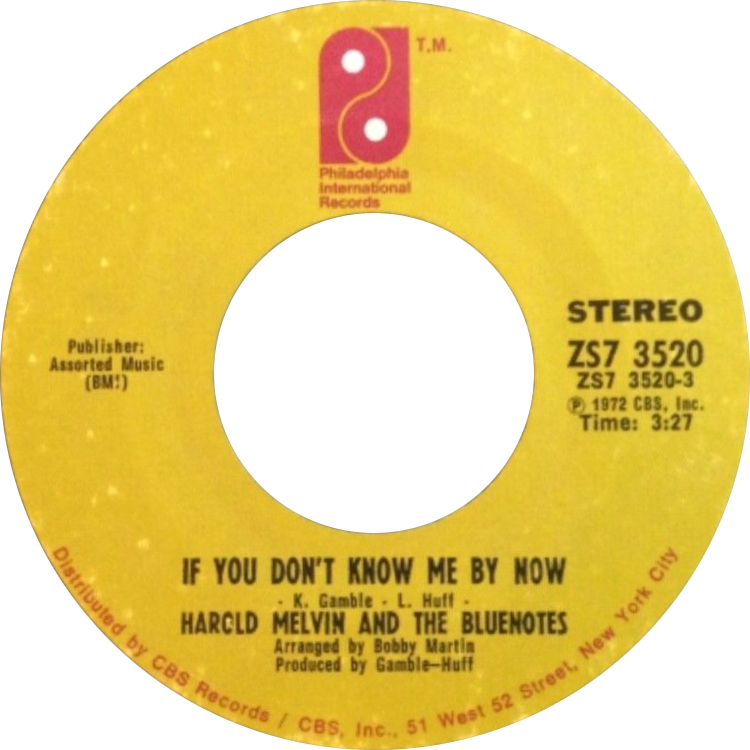
- One of side-A labels of the US single

Single by Harold Melvin & the Blue Notes

from the album I Miss You
- B-side: "Let Me Into Your World"
- Released: September 11, 1972
- Studio: Sigma Sound, Philadelphia, Pennsylvania
- Genre: Philadelphia soul; R&B
- Length: 3:27
- Label: Philadelphia International Records
- Songwriter: Kenny Gamble, Leon Huff
- Producers: Kenny Gamble, Leon Huff

Harold Melvin & the Blue Notes singles chronology
"I Miss You" (1972)	"If You Don't Know Me by Now" (1972)	"Yesterday I Had the Blues" (1973)

Music video
- "If You Don't Know Me by Now" on YouTube

"If You Don't Know Me by Now" is a song written by Kenny Gamble and Leon Huff, and recorded by the Philadelphia soul musical group Harold Melvin & the Blue Notes. It became their first hit after being released as a single in September 1972, topping the US R&B chart and peaking at number 3 on the US Billboard Hot 100.

"If You Don't Know Me by Now" was originally written for Labelle (a trio led by Patti LaBelle) but they never recorded it. The song's composers Gamble and Huff gave it to Harold Melvin & the Blue Notes. Their version featured Teddy Pendergrass as lead vocalist and background vocals by producers Gamble, Huff, Carl Helm, and Bunny Sigler. In addition to the single release, the track was included on their debut album, I Miss You.

Patti LaBelle later made the song part of her concert repertoire in 1982; a live version appears on her 1985 album, Patti.

"If You Don't Know Me by Now" has since been recorded by a number of other artists, most notably the English pop and soul band Simply Red, who took their version to number one on the Billboard Hot 100 in 1989.

The song was chosen as one of the "Songs of the Century" by the Recording Industry Association of America (RIAA).

== Charts ==
=== Weekly charts ===
Chart (1972–1973)	Peak position
Canada Top Singles (RPM)	52
Ireland (IRMA)	16
UK Singles (OCC)	9
US Billboard Hot 100	3
US R&B (Billboard)	1
US Cash Box Top 100	2

=== Year-end charts ===
Chart (1973)	Rank
US Cash Box	86

== Simply Red version ==
"If You Don't Know Me by Now"

Single by Simply Red

from the album A New Flame
- B-side: "Move On Out"
- Released: March 27, 1989
- Genre: Smooth soul; R&B; soft rock; easy listening
- Length: 3:24
- Label: WEA; Elektra
- Songwriters: Kenny Gamble; Leon Huff
- Producer: Stewart Levine

Simply Red singles chronology
"It's Only Love" (1989)	"If You Don't Know Me by Now" (1989)	"A New Flame" (1989)

Music video
- "If You Don't Know Me by Now" on YouTube

Simply Red's version of "If You Don't Know Me by Now" was recorded for their third studio album, A New Flame (1989), and released in March 1989 by WEA and Elektra Records as the second single from the album. It was a commercial success, giving the band their second US number one and also topping the charts of Australia and New Zealand; in the latter country, it was the best-selling single of 1989. On the UK Singles Chart, it peaked at number two, becoming the band's second top-10 hit in their home country. This version won the Grammy Award for the Best R&B Song of 1989. The single's music video, filmed in London, was directed by Vaughan Arnell and Anthea Benton.

According to the producer, Stewart Levine, he did not want too much orchestration on the record, and went with a two-part harmony instead of a three-part harmony. Mick Hucknall admitted he loved Harold Melvin & the Blue Notes' version, and stated he danced to their music when he was 13.

=== Critical reception ===
Jerry Smith from Music Week wrote, "Top-notch purveyors of smooth soul, Simply Red deliver this excellent version of the old Harold Melvin & the Bluenotes classic, lifted from their already platinum-selling A New Flame LP. As a follow-up to their 'It's Only Love' hit, it's a sure fire winner. Expect mass exposure."

=== Track listings ===
- 7-inch single
1. "If You Don't Know Me by Now" – 3:23
2. "Move On Out" (recorded live Manchester on February 22, 1989) – 5:18
- 12-inch single
1. "If You Don't Know Me by Now" – 3:23
2. "Move On Out" (recorded live Manchester on February 22, 1989) – 5:18
3. "Shine" (recorded live Manchester on February 22, 1989) – 3:30
- 3-inch CD single
1. "If You Don't Know Me by Now" – 3:23
2. "Move On Out" (recorded live Manchester on February 22, 1989) – 5:18
3. "Shine" (recorded live Manchester on February 22, 1989) – 3:30
4. "Sugar Daddy" – 3:30

=== Charts ===
==== Weekly charts ====
Chart (1989)	Peak position
Australia (ARIA)	1
Austria (Ö3 Austria Top 40)	9
Belgium (Ultratop 50 Flanders)	5
Canada Top Singles (RPM)	3
Canada Adult Contemporary (RPM)	5
Europe (Eurochart Hot 100)	6
France (SNEP)	11
Ireland (IRMA)	4
Italy Airplay (Music & Media)	2
Luxembourg (Radio Luxembourg)	1
Netherlands (Dutch Top 40)	3
Netherlands (Single Top 100)	5
New Zealand (Recorded Music NZ)	1
Norway (VG-lista)	2
Sweden (Sverigetopplistan)	2
Switzerland (Schweizer Hitparade)	12
UK Singles (Official Charts)	2
US Billboard Hot 100	1
US Adult Contemporary (Billboard)	1
US Hot Black Singles (Billboard)	38
US Cash Box Top 100	2
West Germany (GfK)	19

==== Year-end charts ====
Chart (1989)	Position
Australia (ARIA)	13
Austria (Ö3 Austria Top 40)	29
Belgium (Ultratop 50 Flanders)	28
Canada Top Singles (RPM)	12
Europe (Eurochart Hot 100)	43
Netherlands (Dutch Top 40)	18
Netherlands (Single Top 100)	48
New Zealand (RIANZ)	1
UK Singles (OCC)	38
US Billboard Hot 100	24
US Adult Contemporary (Billboard)	2
West Germany (Media Control)	88

=== Certifications ===
Region	Certification	Certified units/sales
Australia (ARIA)	Gold	35,000^{^}
Denmark (IFPI Danmark)	Gold	45,000^{‡}
New Zealand (RMNZ)	Platinum	30,000^{‡}
Sweden (GLF)	Gold	25,000^{^}
United Kingdom (BPI)	Gold	400,000^{‡}
United States (RIAA)	Gold	500,000^{^}
^{^} Shipments figures based on certification alone.^{‡} Sales+streaming figures based on certification alone.

=== Release history ===
Region	Date	Format(s)	Label(s)	Ref.
United Kingdom	March 27, 1989	7-inch vinyl; 12-inch vinyl; CD	WEA; Elektra	
United Kingdom	May 1, 1989	10-inch vinyl; mini-CD	WEA; Elektra	
Japan	May 25, 1989	Mini-CD	WEA; Elektra	

== Other versions ==
- In 1976, Jamaican reggae band Zap Pow released a version in the UK on Trojan Records.
- In 1989, the South African jazz trumpeter Hugh Masekela also made a version on his album 'Uptownship'.
- The musician Seal recorded a version for his 2008 album Soul. His version became his first top 10 on the US Adult Contemporary chart since "Love's Divine" in 2004. The version was also nominated at the 2010 Grammy Awards for Best Male Pop Vocal Performance.
- The Voice of Holland winner Ben Saunders performed the song during the show's first season. His recorded version topped the Dutch Single Top 100 in 2010.
- A comedic cover version by Ricky Gervais, in character as David Brent, appeared in the 2003 Christmas special of the British comedy series The Office.
- Martina McBride recorded it for her 2014 album Everlasting.

== See also ==
- List of Best Selling Soul Singles number ones of 1972
- List of Hot Adult Contemporary number ones of 1989
