= Gene McFadden =

American singer-songwriter (1949–2006)

- Born: January 28, 1949; Olanta, South Carolina, U.S.
- Died: January 27, 2006 (aged 56) Philadelphia, Pennsylvania, U.S.
- Genres: Disco, R&B, Philly soul
- Occupations: Singer, songwriter, record producer
- Instrument: Vocals
- Years active: 1966–2006
- Label: Philadelphia International
- Formerly of: McFadden & Whitehead

Gene McFadden (January 28, 1949 – January 27, 2006) was an American singer, songwriter, and record producer. He was one of the key members of the Philadelphia International record label, and was one-half of the successful team of McFadden & Whitehead with John Whitehead.

== Biography ==
McFadden met John Whitehead as a teenager and together they founded the Epsilons, a soul music group. The group was discovered by Otis Redding, who acted as their manager. They later toured with Redding until his death in 1967, after which, they signed with Kenny Gamble and Leon Huff's Philadelphia International record label.

McFadden & Whitehead soon gained attention for their songwriting ability when their song "Back Stabbers", recorded by The O'Jays, went to No. 3 on the Billboard Hot 100. The duo wrote many songs for other Philadelphia International artists and had hits such as Harold Melvin & the Blue Notes' "Wake Up Everybody (Part 1)", "Bad Luck", The Intruders' "I’ll Always Love My Mama," and their own, "Ain't No Stoppin' Us Now" (#1 R&B) in 1979. McFadden, along with Whitehead, was instrumental in defining the sound of Philadelphia soul.

== Illness and death ==
McFadden was diagnosed with liver and lung cancer in 2004, and died from the disease at his home in the Mount Airy section of Philadelphia on January 27, 2006, one day shy of his 57th birthday. He was survived by his wife Barbara, two daughters, and two sons.

== Legacy ==
In 2016, a federal appeals court ruled that the estates of both McFadden and Whitehead were allowed to retain control of the duo's song catalog.

== Other sources ==
- Jeckell, Barry A. (January 30, 2006). "R&B Artist/Songwriter Gene McFadden Dies". Billboard. Retrieved on April 13, 2007.
- Perrone, Pierre (January 31, 2006). "Obituary". The Independent. Retrieved on April 13, 2007.
