= John Whitehead (singer) =

American singer-songwriter (1948–2004)

- Born: John Cavadus Whitehead; July 10, 1948; Philadelphia, Pennsylvania, U.S.
- Died: May 11, 2004 (aged 55) Philadelphia, Pennsylvania, U.S.
- Genres: Disco, R&B, Philly soul
- Occupations: Singer, songwriter, record producer
- Years active: 1968–2004
- Label: Philadelphia International
- Formerly of: McFadden & Whitehead

John Cavadus Whitehead (July 10, 1948 – May 11, 2004) was an American singer and songwriter. He was best known as one of the key members of the Philadelphia International record label, and was one-half of the successful team of McFadden & Whitehead with Gene McFadden.

McFadden and Whitehead wrote many hits for Philadelphia International artists, including the O'Jays and Harold Melvin & the Blue Notes, and had their own hit with "Ain't No Stoppin' Us Now" in 1979.

He was the father of both members of the Whitehead Brothers, a mid-1990s duo.

== Death ==
On May 11, 2004, Whitehead was fatally shot, possibly in a case of mistaken identity, while fixing a car outside his home in Philadelphia. Another man with him at the time suffered light injuries from the multiple shots fired by two gunmen, who fled the scene. The murder remains unsolved. Whitehead was 55 years old and had converted to Islam in 1996. He is buried in Mount Moriah Cemetery in Philadelphia.

== See also ==
- List of unsolved murders (2000–present)
