= Harold Melvin & the Blue Notes =

American soul and R&B vocal group

- Also known as: The Charlemagnes; The Blue Notes; Harold Melvin's Blue Notes
- Origin: Philadelphia, Pennsylvania, U.S.
- Genres: R&B; soul; disco; Philadelphia soul
- Years active: 1954–1996, 2003, 2013, 2015, 2017
- Labels: Philadelphia International; ABC; Source; Philly World
- Past members: Harold Melvin; Bernard Williams; Don Haney; Roosevelt Brodie; Jesse Gillis Jr. Franklin Peaker; John Atkins; Teddy Pendergrass; Lawrence Brown; Bernard Wilson; Lloyd Parks; Jerry Cummings; Martin Cornwell; Sharon Paige; David Ebo; Dwight Johnson; William Spratley; Gil Saunders; Robert "Bobby" Cook / John Donnell Gillespie

Harold Melvin & the Blue Notes were an American soul and R&B vocal group. One of the most popular Philadelphia soul groups of the 1970s, the group's repertoire included soul, R&B, doo-wop, and disco. Founded in Philadelphia, Pennsylvania, in the middle of the 1950s as The Charlemagnes, the group is most noted for several hits on Gamble and Huff's Philadelphia International label between 1972 and 1976, although they performed and recorded until Melvin's death in 1997. Despite group founder and original lead singer Harold Melvin's top billing, the Blue Notes' most famous member was Teddy Pendergrass, their lead singer during the successful years at Philadelphia International. The remaining members of the Blue Notes have reunited for Soul Train Cruises in 2013, 2015, and 2017.

== History ==
=== Early years ===
The group formerly known as The Charlemagnes took on the name "The Blue Notes" in 1954, with a line-up consisting of lead singer Franklin Peaker, Bernard Williams, Roosevelt Brodie, Jesse Gillis, Jr., and Harold Melvin. The group recorded for a number of labels without success from its inception into the 1960s. The 1960 single "My Hero" was a minor hit for Val-ue Records, and 1965's "Get Out (and Let Me Cry)" was an R&B hit for Landa Records. During this period, the group's line-up changed frequently, with Bernard Williams leaving the act to start a group called "The Original Blue Notes", and Harold Melvin bringing in new lead singer John Atkins. In 1970, the group recruited Teddy Pendergrass as the drummer for their backing band. Pendergrass had been a member of Philadelphia R&B group The Cadillacs (not the New York group that had hits in the late 1950s) and was promoted to lead singer when John Atkins quit the same year.

=== Philadelphia International success and Pendergrass Years ===
This line-up of the group, featuring Melvin, Pendergrass, Bernard Wilson, Lawrence Brown, and Lloyd Parks, was signed to Gamble & Huff's Philadelphia International label in 1972. Lloyd Parks was replaced by Jerry Cummings that same year. Shortly after the arrival of Cummings, the Notes scored several major R&B and pop hits including million-selling singles and albums over the next four years. Among the Blue Notes' most important and successful recordings are love songs such as 1972's "If You Don't Know Me by Now" (number 1 Billboard R&B, number 3 pop), their breakout single, "I Miss You" (number 7 R&B, number 58 pop), "The Love I Lost" (number 1 R&B, number 7 pop, 1973) and socially conscious songs such as "Wake Up Everybody" (number 1 R&B, number 12 pop) and "Bad Luck" (number 4 R&B, number 15 pop), both in 1975. "If You Don't Know Me By Now" sold over one million copies, and was awarded a gold disc by the RIAA on November 21, 1972. "Bad Luck" holds the record for the longest-running number-one hit on the Hot Dance Music/Club Play chart: 11 weeks. A fourth number 1 R&B hit for the group was 1975's "Hope That We Can Be Together Soon" which featured female vocalist Sharon Paige.

In 1976 Gamble and Huff's "Don't Leave Me This Way" (soon to be covered by Motown artist Thelma Houston) was a number-one hit on the US pop chart. The Blue Notes' version on the album, Wake Up Everybody, was not released as a single in the US at the time, but proved to be the group's biggest hit in the UK (number 5) when released there as a single in 1977. The track was finally issued as a single in the US on 12-inch in 1979, coupled with "Bad Luck". The group recorded four albums with Gamble & Huff, all of them going gold (over 500,000 copies), according to RIAA, including To Be True (number 26, Billboard Top 40 albums) and Wake Up Everybody (number 9), both in 1975. Wake Up Everybody and a greatest hits compilation released in 1976, Collector's Item, has now sold over a million copies.

Despite the success, the Blue Notes' line-up continued to change regularly. In 1972, Melvin brought in Jerry Cummings to replace Lloyd Parks and Sharon Paige was added to the line-up at that time, providing solo performances on several recordings. While at the top of their success in 1976, Pendergrass quit after an argument over the money he earned. A year earlier, he had gained billing recognition by having the act renamed to "Harold Melvin & the Blue Notes featuring Theodore Pendergrass", starting from the To be True album. Pendergrass went on to a successful solo career, with four consecutive million-selling albums with Philadelphia International between 1977 and 1981. His career was almost ended by a paralyzing 1982 car accident. He made a triumphant comeback in 1984, signing with Asylum/Elektra Records, and recording the hit LP Love Language and then the platinum-selling Joy LP, released in 1988, which featured the Grammy-nominated title song, an R&B number 1; his comeback was cemented by an appearance at the Live Aid concert in 1985.

=== Post Pendergrass years ===
Melvin replaced Pendergrass with David Ebo. The Blue Notes departed Philadelphia International (who had signed Pendergrass for solo recordings) and joined ABC Records in 1977, where they recorded two albums produced by Melvin. "Reaching for the World" (number 7 R&B, number 74 pop) became the group's last major-selling single. Harold Melvin, Jerry Cummings, and new members Dwight Johnson, David Ebo and William Spratley released The Blue Album in 1980 on Source Records, an imprint of MCA Records, which had acquired ABC Records in 1979. Their final album for MCA, All Things Happen in Time, was released in 1981.

Gil Saunders took the lead position in 1982, replacing David Ebo. With Gil Saunders, the group had success in the United Kingdom with the Philly World album Talk It Up (Tell Everybody), and singles such as "Today's Your Lucky Day" and "Don't Give Me Up". Several of the Pendergrass-era hits were re-recorded in the UK with Gil Saunders on lead. Saunders left the act in 1992, and Harold Melvin continued to tour with various line-ups of Blue Notes, until suffering a stroke in 1996.

Melvin died on March 24, 1997, at age 57 and was laid to rest at the Ivy Hill Cemetery in Philadelphia. Lawrence Brown died of a respiratory condition on April 6, 2008, at age 63. In addition, three former members of the group would die during the year 2010. First, Teddy Pendergrass died of respiratory failure on January 13, 2010, at age 59, after having previously dealt with colon cancer. Six months later, original member Roosevelt Brodie, who was the second tenor for the original Blue Notes, died July 13, 2010, at age 75 due to complications of diabetes. Just five months later, Bernard Wilson died on December 26, 2010, at age 64 from complications of a stroke and heart attack. Pendergrass' predecessor, John Atkins, died of an aneurysm in 1998. David Ebo, who succeeded Pendergrass, died of bone cancer on November 30, 1993, at age 43. The death of Sharon Paige was reported on July 5, 2020. Gil Saunders died on February 4, 2021.

Lloyd Parks, Jerry Cummings, and Bobby Cook are the sole survivors of the Blue Notes.

=== Legacy ===
Harold Melvin & the Blue Notes hits have been re-recorded by other artists, including David Ruffin, Simply Red, Jimmy Somerville, Sybil, the Three Degrees, Thelma Houston and John Legend, while dance music DJ Danny Rampling cites "Wake Up Everybody" as his favorite song of all time. Gil Saunders continued to perform as a solo artist, and performed all the hits of the past as well as his own material. Several members of various incarnations of the Blue Notes continue to tour as "Harold Melvin's Blue Notes". Melvin's widow, Ovelia currently manages Harold Melvin's Blue Notes, featuring lead singer Donnell "Big Daddy" Gillespie, Anthony Brooks, Rufus Thorne and John Morris.

For his album This Note's for You, singer Neil Young named his back-up band, the Blue Notes, without permission from name rights holder Harold Melvin. Melvin took legal action against Young over use of the Blue Notes name, forcing the singer to change the name of the back-up band to "Ten Men Workin'" during the balance of the tour that promoted the This Note's for You album. The album subsequently was credited as a Young solo album, with the backing band's credits removed.

The band is mentioned on Snoop Dogg's 1993 album Doggystyle. In the intro for "Doggy Dogg World" Snoop says "Bitch, you without me is like Harold Melvin without the Blue Notes, you'll never go platinum!" Former member Jerry Cummings is an ordained minister and has been asked to form Jerry Cummings' Blue Notes but has turned down the offer. As of May 2014 Jerry Cummings became the Music Life Coach and producer of the X Factor superstar Lillie McCloud and Lillie has recorded one of Cummings' songs "The Other Part of Me". Rapper Big Boi uses a sample of "I Miss You" on his song "Shine Blockas" feat. Gucci Mane. "I Miss You" was also sampled by Kanye West on Jay-Z's song "This Can't Be Life", featuring Beanie Sigel and Scarface. Also the R&B singer Pleasure P used a sample of "I Miss You" on his song "Letter to My Ex" recorded in 2013.

Harold Melvin & the Blue Notes were inducted into the Vocal Group Hall of Fame in 2007.
