= List of Billboard Hot 100 top-ten singles in 1976 =

This is a list of singles that have peaked in the Top 10 of the Billboard Hot 100 during 1976.

Captain & Tennille scored three top ten hits during the year with "Lonely Night", "Shop Around", and "Muskrat Love", the most among all other artists.

== Top-ten singles ==
- (#) – 1976 Year-end top 10 single position and rank

List of Billboard Hot 100 top ten singles which peaked in 1976
Top ten entry date	Single	Artist(s)	Peak	Peak date	Weeks in top ten
Singles from 1975
December 6	"Saturday Night"	Bay City Rollers	1	January 3	6
December 13	"Theme from Mahogany (Do You Know Where You're Going To)"	Diana Ross	1	January 24	7
December 13	"Love Rollercoaster"	Ohio Players	1	January 31	10
December 13	"Fox on the Run"	Sweet	5	January 17	6
December 20	"I Write the Songs"	Barry Manilow	1	January 17	10
December 27	"Convoy"	C. W. McCall	1	January 10	7
December 27	"I Love Music"	The O'Jays	5	January 24	6
Singles from 1976
January 10	"Love to Love You Baby"	Donna Summer	2	February 7	7
January 10	"Times of Your Life"	Paul Anka	7	February 7	5
January 17	"You Sexy Thing"	Hot Chocolate	3	February 7	8
January 17	"Walk Away from Love"	David Ruffin	9	January 24	3
January 24	"Sing a Song"	Earth, Wind & Fire	5	February 7	4
January 31	"50 Ways to Leave Your Lover" (#8)	Paul Simon	1	February 7	6
February 7	"Theme from S.W.A.T."	Rhythm Heritage	1	February 28	6
February 7	"Breaking Up Is Hard to Do"	Neil Sedaka	8	February 21	3
February 14	"Love Machine" (#7)	The Miracles	1	March 6	6
February 14	"Evil Woman"	Electric Light Orchestra	10	February 14	2
February 21	"All by Myself"	Eric Carmen	2	March 6	6
February 21	"Take It to the Limit"	Eagles	4	March 13	5
February 28	"December, 1963 (Oh, What a Night)" (#4)	The Four Seasons	1	March 13	6
February 28	"Dream Weaver"	Gary Wright	2	March 27	8
February 28	"Lonely Night"	Captain & Tennille	3	March 27	8
February 28	"Love Hurts"	Nazareth	8	March 13	3
March 13	"Sweet Thing"	Rufus featuring Chaka Khan	5	April 3	4
March 13	"Junk Food Junkie"	Larry Groce	9	March 20	2
March 20	"Disco Lady" (#3)	Johnnie Taylor	1	April 3	8
March 20	"Dream On"	Aerosmith	6	April 10	4
March 27	"Let Your Love Flow"	The Bellamy Brothers	1	May 1	7
March 27	"Right Back Where We Started From"	Maxine Nightingale	2	May 1	8
March 27	"Money Honey"	Bay City Rollers	9	April 3	2
April 3	"Golden Years"	David Bowie	10	April 3	2
April 10	"Boogie Fever"	The Sylvers	1	May 15	7
April 10	"Sweet Love"	Commodores	5	April 24	4
April 10	"Only Sixteen"	Dr. Hook	6	April 17	3
April 17	"Bohemian Rhapsody"	Queen	9	April 24	3
April 17	"Show Me the Way"	Peter Frampton	6	May 8	5
April 24	"Welcome Back"	John Sebastian	1	May 8	7
April 24	"Fooled Around and Fell in Love"	Elvin Bishop	3	May 22	6
May 1	"Love Hangover"	Diana Ross	1	May 29	9
May 8	"Silly Love Songs" (#1)	Wings	1	May 22	11
May 8	"Get Up and Boogie"	Silver Convention	2	June 12	9
May 15	"Happy Days"	Pratt & McClain	5	June 5	5
May 15	"Shannon"	Henry Gross	6	June 5	6
May 22	"Misty Blue"	Dorothy Moore	3	June 12	8
May 22	"Tryin' to Get the Feeling Again"	Barry Manilow	10	May 22	2
May 29	"Sara Smile"	Hall & Oates	4	June 26	7
June 5	"Shop Around"	Captain & Tennille	4	July 10	7
June 5	"Fool to Cry"	The Rolling Stones	10	June 5	2
June 12	"More, More, More"	The Andrea True Connection	4	July 17	6
June 19	"Afternoon Delight"	Starland Vocal Band	1	July 10	8
June 19	"I'll Be Good to You"	The Brothers Johnson	3	July 10	7
June 26	"Kiss and Say Goodbye" (#6)	The Manhattans	1	July 24	9
July 3	"Love Is Alive" (#9)	Gary Wright	2	July 31	7
July 10	"Got to Get You into My Life"	The Beatles	7	July 24	5
July 17	"Moonlight Feels Right"	Starbuck	3	July 31	4
July 17	"Rock and Roll Music"	The Beach Boys	5	August 14	6
July 24	"Don't Go Breaking My Heart" (#2)	Elton John & Kiki Dee	1	August 7	8
July 24	"Get Closer"	Seals and Crofts	6	July 24	4
July 24	"Let Her In"	John Travolta	10	July 24	1
July 31	"Let 'Em In"	Wings	3	August 14	7
August 7	"You Should Be Dancing"	Bee Gees	1	September 4	7
August 7	"You'll Never Find Another Love Like Mine"	Lou Rawls	2	September 4	8
August 14	"(Shake, Shake, Shake) Shake Your Booty"	KC and the Sunshine Band	1	September 11	11
August 14	"I'd Really Love to See You Tonight"	England Dan & John Ford Coley	2	September 25	10
August 14	"Turn the Beat Around"	Vicki Sue Robinson	10	August 14	2
August 28	"Play That Funky Music" (#5)	Wild Cherry	1	September 18	10
August 28	"A Fifth of Beethoven" (#10)	Walter Murphy & the Big Apple Band	1	October 9	10
August 28	"This Masquerade"	George Benson	10	August 28	2
September 4	"Lowdown"	Boz Scaggs	3	October 9	8
September 11	"Summer"	War	7	September 25	4
September 18	"If You Leave Me Now"	Chicago	1	October 23	9
September 18	"Devil Woman"	Cliff Richard	6	September 25	5
September 25	"Disco Duck"	Rick Dees & His Cast of Idiots	1	October 16	10
October 2	"Still the One"	Orleans	5	October 23	4
October 9	"She's Gone"	Hall & Oates	7	October 30	5
October 23	"Rock'n Me"	Steve Miller Band	1	November 6	5
October 23	"Love So Right"	Bee Gees	3	November 20	8
October 30	"The Wreck of the Edmund Fitzgerald"	Gordon Lightfoot	2	November 20	6
October 30	"Muskrat Love"	Captain & Tennille	4	November 20	8
October 30	"Magic Man"	Heart	9	November 6	2
November 6	"Tonight's the Night"	Rod Stewart	1	November 13	11
November 6	"Just to Be Close to You"	Commodores	7	November 27	4
November 13	"The Rubberband Man"	The Spinners	2	December 4	9
November 13	"Do You Feel Like We Do"	Peter Frampton	10	November 13	2
November 20	"Beth" / "Detroit Rock City"	Kiss	7	December 4	3
November 27	"More Than a Feeling"	Boston	5	December 25	6
November 27	"Nadia's Theme"	Barry De Vorzon and Perry Botkin Jr.	8	December 11	4
December 4	"You Are the Woman"	Firefall	9	December 11	3
December 11	"Nights Are Forever Without You"	England Dan & John Ford Coley	10	December 11	2
December 18	"Sorry Seems to Be the Hardest Word"	Elton John	6	December 25	5

=== 1975 peaks ===
List of Billboard Hot 100 top ten singles in 1976 which peaked in 1975
Top ten entry date	Single	Artist(s)	Peak	Peak date	Weeks in top ten
November 15	"That's the Way (I Like It)"	KC and the Sunshine Band	1	November 22	9
November 22	"Fly, Robin, Fly"	Silver Convention	1	November 29	7
November 22	"Let's Do It Again"	The Staple Singers	1	December 27	7

=== 1977 peaks ===
List of Billboard Hot 100 top ten singles in 1976 which peaked in 1977
Top ten entry date	Single	Artist(s)	Peak	Peak date	Weeks in top ten
December 4	"You Don't Have to Be a Star (To Be in My Show)"	Marilyn McCoo and Billy Davis Jr.	1	January 8	8
December 11	"You Make Me Feel Like Dancing"	Leo Sayer	1	January 15	8
December 25	"I Wish"	Stevie Wonder	1	January 22	8
December 25	"Car Wash"	Rose Royce	1	January 29	9
December 25	"Dazz"	Brick	3	January 29	8
December 25	"After the Lovin'"	Engelbert Humperdinck	8	January 22	5

== See also ==
- 1976 in music
- List of Billboard Hot 100 number ones of 1976
- Billboard Year-End Hot 100 singles of 1976
