= Billboard Year-End Hot 100 singles of 1976 =

Ranking of recorded music

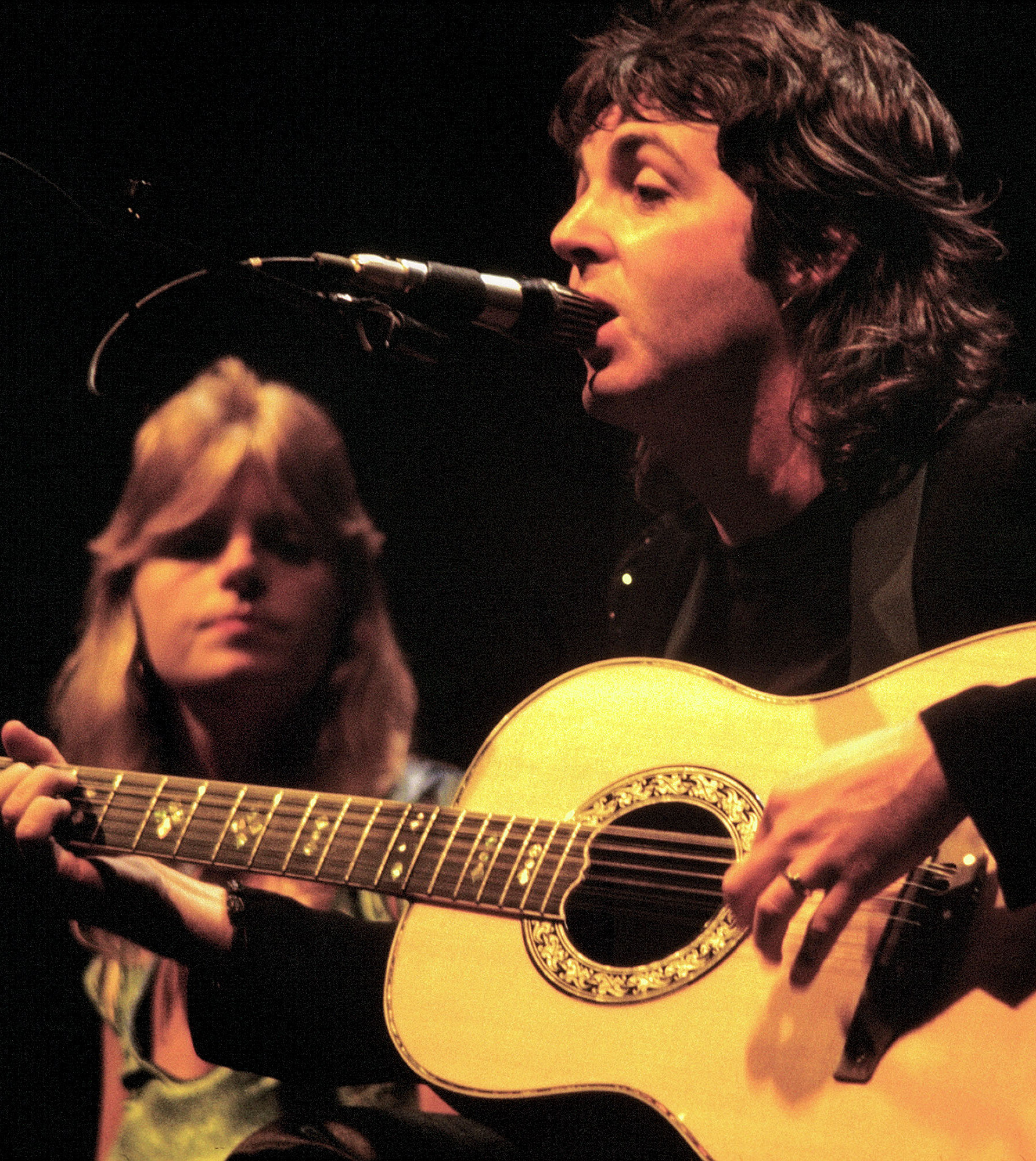
Wings had two songs on the Year-End Hot 100, including "Silly Love Songs", the number one song of the year.

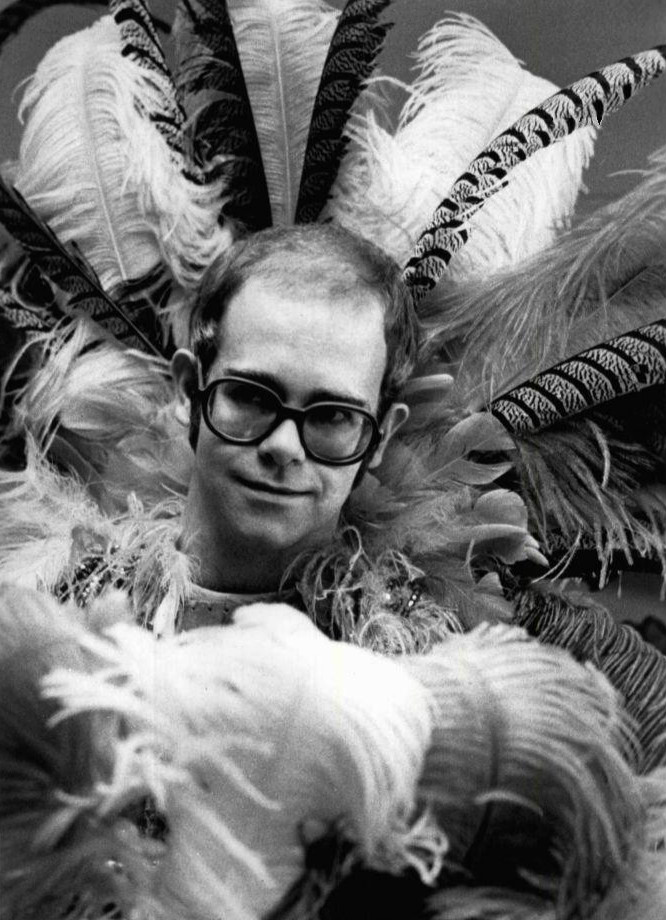
Elton John had two songs on 1976's year-end chart, including "Don't Go Breaking My Heart", a duet with Kiki Dee that ended the year at number two.

This is a list of Billboard magazine's Top Hot 100 songs of 1976. The Top 100, as revealed in the year-end edition of Billboard dated December 25, 1976, is based on Hot 100 charts from the issue dates of November 8, 1975 through October 30, 1976.

No.	Title	Artist(s)
1	"Silly Love Songs"	Wings
2	"Don't Go Breaking My Heart"	Elton John & Kiki Dee
3	"Disco Lady"	Johnnie Taylor
4	"December, 1963 (Oh, What a Night)"	The Four Seasons
5	"Play That Funky Music"	Wild Cherry
6	"Kiss and Say Goodbye"	The Manhattans
7	"Love Machine"	The Miracles
8	"50 Ways to Leave Your Lover"	Paul Simon
9	"Love Is Alive"	Gary Wright
10	"A Fifth of Beethoven"	Walter Murphy & The Big Apple Band
11	"Sara Smile"	Daryl Hall & John Oates
12	"Afternoon Delight"	Starland Vocal Band
13	"I Write the Songs"	Barry Manilow
14	"Fly, Robin, Fly"	Silver Convention
15	"Love Hangover"	Diana Ross
16	"Get Closer"	Seals and Crofts
17	"More, More, More"	Andrea True Connection
18	"Bohemian Rhapsody"	Queen
19	"Misty Blue"	Dorothy Moore
20	"Boogie Fever"	The Sylvers
21	"I'd Really Love to See You Tonight"	England Dan & John Ford Coley
22	"You Sexy Thing"	Hot Chocolate
23	"Love Hurts"	Nazareth
24	"Get Up and Boogie"	Silver Convention
25	"Take It to the Limit"	Eagles
26	"(Shake, Shake, Shake) Shake Your Booty"	KC and the Sunshine Band
27	"Sweet Love"	Commodores
28	"Right Back Where We Started From"	Maxine Nightingale
29	"Theme from S.W.A.T."	Rhythm Heritage
30	"Love Rollercoaster"	Ohio Players
31	"You Should Be Dancing"	Bee Gees
32	"You'll Never Find Another Love Like Mine"	Lou Rawls
33	"Golden Years"	David Bowie
34	"Moonlight Feels Right"	Starbuck
35	"Only Sixteen"	Dr. Hook
36	"Let Your Love Flow"	The Bellamy Brothers
37	"Dream Weaver"	Gary Wright
38	"Turn the Beat Around"	Vicki Sue Robinson
39	"Lonely Night (Angel Face)"	Captain & Tennille
40	"All by Myself"	Eric Carmen
41	"Love to Love You Baby"	Donna Summer
42	"Deep Purple"	Donny & Marie Osmond
43	"Theme from Mahogany (Do You Know Where You're Going To)"	Diana Ross
44	"Sweet Thing"	Rufus
45	"That's the Way (I Like It)"	KC and the Sunshine Band
46	"A Little Bit More"	Dr. Hook
47	"Shannon"	Henry Gross
48	"If You Leave Me Now"	Chicago
49	"Lowdown"	Boz Scaggs
50	"Show Me the Way"	Peter Frampton
51	"Dream On"	Aerosmith
52	"I Love Music"	The O'Jays
53	"Say You Love Me"	Fleetwood Mac
54	"Times of Your Life"	Paul Anka
55	"Devil Woman"	Cliff Richard
56	"Fooled Around and Fell in Love"	Elvin Bishop
57	"Convoy"	C. W. McCall
58	"Welcome Back"	John Sebastian
59	"Sing a Song"	Earth, Wind & Fire
60	"Heaven Must Be Missing an Angel"	Tavares
61	"I'll Be Good to You"	The Brothers Johnson
62	"Rock and Roll Music"	The Beach Boys
63	"Shop Around"	Captain & Tennille
64	"Saturday Night"	Bay City Rollers
65	"Island Girl"	Elton John
66	"Let's Do It Again"	The Staple Singers
67	"Let 'Em In"	Wings
68	"Baby Face"	Wing and a Prayer Fife and Drum Corps
69	"This Masquerade"	George Benson
70	"Evil Woman"	Electric Light Orchestra
71	"Wham Bam"	Silver
72	"I'm Easy"	Keith Carradine
73	"Wake Up Everybody"	Harold Melvin & the Blue Notes
74	"Summer"	War
75	"Let Her In"	John Travolta
76	"Fox on the Run"	Sweet
77	"Rhiannon"	Fleetwood Mac
78	"Got to Get You into My Life"	The Beatles
79	"Fanny (Be Tender with My Love)"	Bee Gees
80	"Getaway"	Earth, Wind & Fire
81	"She's Gone"	Daryl Hall & John Oates
82	"Still the One"	Orleans
83	"You're My Best Friend"	Queen
84	"With Your Love"	Jefferson Starship
85	"Slow Ride"	Foghat
86	"Who'd She Coo?"	Ohio Players
87	"The Boys Are Back in Town"	Thin Lizzy
88	"Walk Away from Love"	David Ruffin
89	"Baby, I Love Your Way (Live)"	Peter Frampton
90	"Young Hearts Run Free"	Candi Staton
91	"Breaking Up Is Hard to Do"	Neil Sedaka
92	"Money Honey"	Bay City Rollers
93	"Give Up the Funk (Tear the Roof off the Sucker)"	Parliament
94	"Junk Food Junkie"	Larry Groce
95	"Tryin' to Get the Feeling Again"	Barry Manilow
96	"Rock and Roll All Nite (Live)"	Kiss
97	"Disco Duck"	Rick Dees & His Cast of Idiots
98	"Take the Money and Run"	Steve Miller Band
99	"Squeeze Box"	The Who
100	"Country Boy (You Got Your Feet in L.A.)"	Glen Campbell

== See also ==
- 1976 in music
- Billboard Year-End Hot Soul Singles of 1976
- List of Billboard Hot 100 number-one singles of 1976
- List of Billboard Hot 100 top-ten singles in 1976
