= List of number-one singles of 1976 (Canada) =

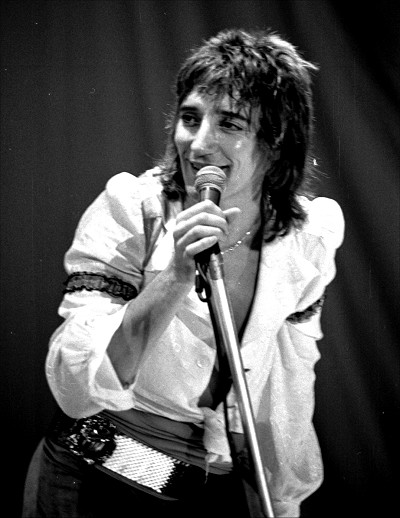
Rod Stewart stayed at number one for five weeks with "Tonight's the Night (Gonna Be Alright)", becoming the number-one year-end single in Canada for 1976

RPM was a Canadian music magazine that published the best-performing singles chart in Canada from 1964 to 2000. In 1976, thirty-three singles reached number one on the RPM chart. The first number one single was "That's the Way (I Like It)" by KC and the Sunshine Band which reached number one in December 1975, and the last was "Tonight's the Night (Gonna Be Alright)" from Scottish rock musician Rod Stewart. Twenty-one acts achieved their first number-one single in the chart in 1976: the Bay City Rollers, the Silver Convention, C. W. McCall, Neil Sedaka, Nazareth, THP Orchestra, Donna Summer, Gary Wright, Queen, The Sylvers, Kiss, Henry Gross, Sweeney Todd, Andrea True Connection, Eric Carmen (formerly of the Raspberries), Starland Vocal Band, Kiki Dee, Walter Murphy and the Big Apple Band, Chicago, Rick Dees and His Cast of Idiots, and Rod Stewart. Three acts, KC and the Sunshine Band, the Bay City Rollers and the Silver Convention had more than one number-one hit for 1976. Neil Sedaka charted his first number-one on the RPM chart with a slow version of "Breaking Up Is Hard to Do", whose original version reached number one in the CHUM Chart in 1962. Three Canadian acts, the THP Orchestra, Sweeney Todd (with Nick Gilder) and Gordon Lightfoot, had one number-one song each in the chart that year.

The longest-running number-one single of the year, and also the best-performing single of the year, was Rod Stewart's "Tonight's the Night (Gonna Be Alright)", which spent five weeks at number one. C. W. McCall's "Convoy" stayed at number one for four weeks, while Sweeney Todd's "Roxy Roller", Elton John and Kiki Dee's "Don't Go Breaking My Heart" and Rick Dees and His Cast of Idiots' "Disco Duck" had also stayed at number one for three weeks each.

== Chart history ==
Key
The yellow background indicates the #1 song on RPM's year-end top 200 singles chart of 1976.

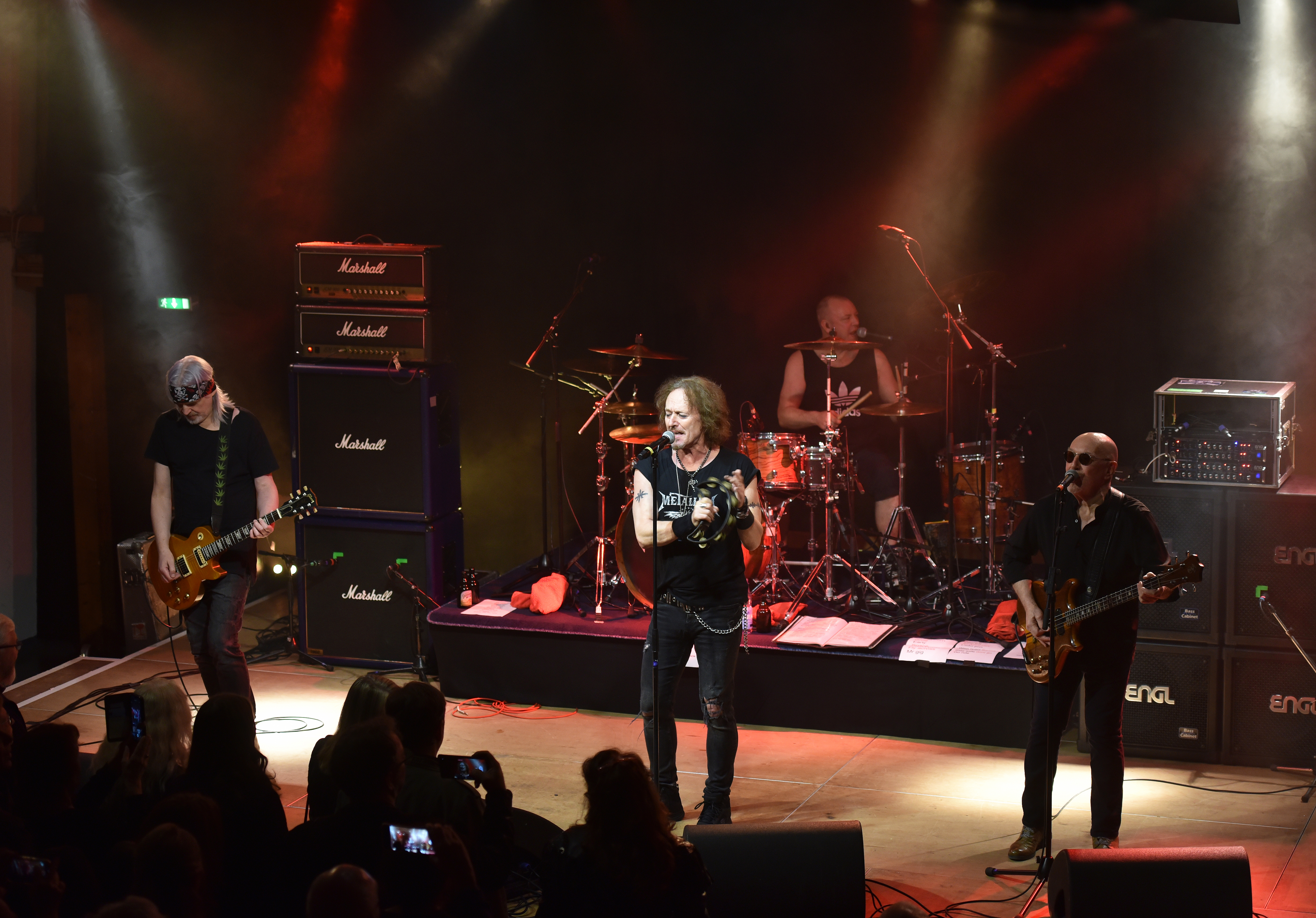
Scottish hard rock band Nazareth (pictured in 2022) had their only Canada number-one single with "Love Hurts"

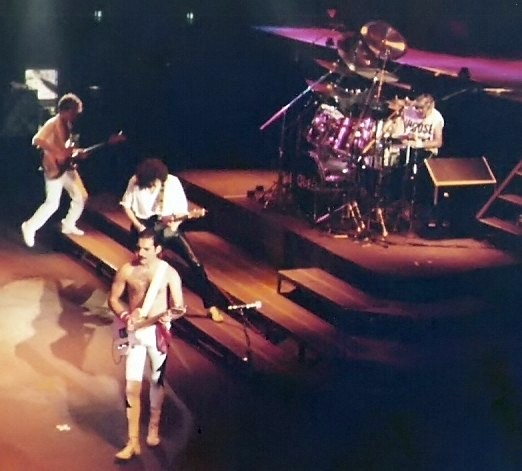
Queen had their first number-one on the RPM chart with "Bohemian Rhapsody".

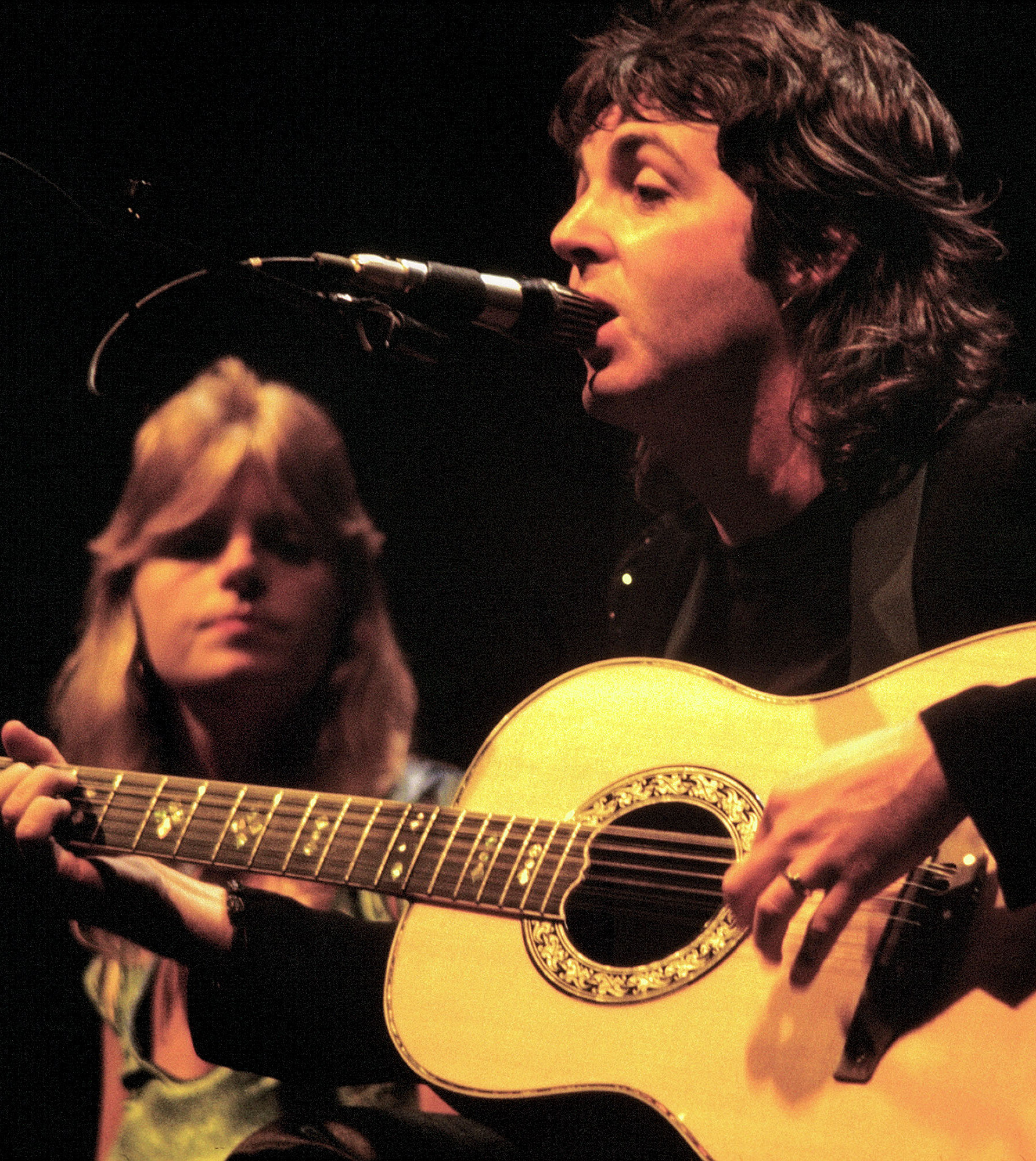
Wings had their third Canada number-one single with "Silly Love Songs".

Chart history
| Issue date | Title | Artist(s) | Ref. |
|---|---|---|---|
| January 3 (Note: Due to a week's break in publication for the 1975/1976 New Year period, January 3 is inferred.) | "That's the Way (I Like It)" | KC and the Sunshine Band | |
| January 10 | "Saturday Night" | Bay City Rollers | |
| January 17 | "Fly, Robin, Fly" | Silver Convention | |
| January 24 | "Convoy" | C. W. McCall | |
| January 31 | "Convoy" | C. W. McCall | |
| February 7 | "Convoy" | C. W. McCall | |
| February 14 | "Convoy" | C. W. McCall | |
| February 21 | "Breaking Up Is Hard to Do" | Neil Sedaka | |
| February 28 | "Love Hurts" | Nazareth | |
| March 6 | "Squeeze Box" | The Who | |
| March 13 | "Money Honey" | Bay City Rollers | |
| March 20 | "Theme from S.W.A.T." | THP Orchestra | |
| March 27 | "Love to Love You Baby" | Donna Summer | |
| April 3 | "Dream Weaver" | Gary Wright | |
| April 10 | "December, 1963 (Oh, What a Night)" | The Four Seasons | |
| April 17 | "Lonely Night (Angel Face)" | Captain & Tennille | |
| April 24 | "Lonely Night (Angel Face)" | Captain & Tennille | |
| May 1 | "Bohemian Rhapsody" | Queen | |
| May 8 | "Bohemian Rhapsody" | Queen | |
| May 15 | "Boogie Fever" | The Sylvers | |
| May 22 | "Shout It Out Loud" | Kiss | |
| May 29 | "Shannon" | Henry Gross | |
| June 5 | "Silly Love Songs" | Wings | |
| June 12 | "Silly Love Songs" | Wings | |
| June 19 | "Get Up and Boogie" | Silver Convention | |
| June 26 | "Roxy Roller" | Sweeney Todd | |
| July 3 | "Roxy Roller" | Sweeney Todd | |
| July 10 | "Roxy Roller" | Sweeney Todd | |
| July 17 | "More, More, More" | Andrea True Connection | |
| July 24 | "Never Gonna Fall in Love Again" | Eric Carmen | |
| July 31 | "Afternoon Delight" | Starland Vocal Band | |
| August 7 | "Afternoon Delight" | Starland Vocal Band | |
| August 14 | "Got to Get You into My Life" | The Beatles | |
| August 21 | "Don't Go Breaking My Heart" | Elton John and Kiki Dee | |
| August 28 | "Don't Go Breaking My Heart" | Elton John and Kiki Dee | |
| September 4 | "Don't Go Breaking My Heart" | Elton John and Kiki Dee | |
| September 11 | "You Should Be Dancing" | Bee Gees | |
| September 18 | "(Shake, Shake, Shake) Shake Your Booty" | KC and the Sunshine Band | |
| September 25 | "A Fifth of Beethoven" | Walter Murphy and the Big Apple Band | |
| October 2 | "A Fifth of Beethoven" | Walter Murphy and the Big Apple Band | |
| October 9 | "If You Leave Me Now" | Chicago | |
| October 16 | "If You Leave Me Now" | Chicago | |
| October 23 | "Disco Duck" | Rick Dees and His Cast of Idiots | |
| October 30 | "Disco Duck" | Rick Dees and His Cast of Idiots | |
| November 6 | "Disco Duck" | Rick Dees and His Cast of Idiots | |
| November 13 | "Rock'n Me" | Steve Miller Band | |
| November 20 | "The Wreck of the Edmund Fitzgerald" | Gordon Lightfoot | |
| November 27 | "Tonight's the Night (Gonna Be Alright)" | Rod Stewart | |
| December 4 | "Tonight's the Night (Gonna Be Alright)" | Rod Stewart | |
| December 11 | "Tonight's the Night (Gonna Be Alright)" | Rod Stewart | |
| December 18 | "Tonight's the Night (Gonna Be Alright)" | Rod Stewart | |
| December 25 | "Tonight's the Night (Gonna Be Alright)" | Rod Stewart | |

== See also ==
- List of RPM number-one easy listening singles of 1976
- List of RPM number-one country singles of 1976
- List of RPM number-one dance singles of 1976
- List of Billboard Hot 100 number ones of 1976
- List of Cashbox Top 100 number-one singles of 1976
