= List of Cash Box Top 100 number-one singles of 1976 =

These singles reached number one on the Cash Box Top 100 chart during 1976.

Key
The yellow background indicates the #1 song of 1976.

Issue date	Song	Artist
January 3	"I Write the Songs"	Barry Manilow
January 10	"Theme From Mahogany (Do You Know Where You're Going To)"	Diana Ross
January 17	"Convoy"	C.W. McCall
January 24	"Convoy"	C.W. McCall
January 31	"Convoy"	C.W. McCall
February 7	"50 Ways to Leave Your Lover"	Paul Simon
February 14	"50 Ways to Leave Your Lover"	Paul Simon
February 21	"50 Ways to Leave Your Lover"	Paul Simon
February 28	"Theme from S.W.A.T."	Rhythm Heritage
March 6	"Love Machine (Part 1)"	The Miracles
March 13	"All by Myself"	Eric Carmen
March 20	"December, 1963 (Oh, What a Night)"	The Four Seasons
March 27	"Dream Weaver"	Gary Wright
April 3	"Lonely Night (Angel Face)"	Captain and Tennille
April 10	"Disco Lady"	Johnnie Taylor
April 17	"Disco Lady"	Johnnie Taylor
April 24	"Right Back Where We Started From"	Maxine Nightingale
May 1	"Let Your Love Flow"	The Bellamy Brothers
May 8	"Boogie Fever"	The Sylvers
May 15	"Welcome Back"	John Sebastian
May 22	"Welcome Back"	John Sebastian
May 29	"Silly Love Songs"	Wings
June 5	"Silly Love Songs"	Wings
June 12	"Love Hangover"	Diana Ross
June 19	"Get Up And Boogie"	Silver Convention
June 26	"Afternoon Delight"	Starland Vocal Band
July 3	"Afternoon Delight"	Starland Vocal Band
July 10	"Afternoon Delight"	Starland Vocal Band
July 17	"Kiss and Say Goodbye"	The Manhattans
July 24	"Kiss and Say Goodbye"	The Manhattans
July 31	"Afternoon Delight"	Starland Vocal Band
August 7	"Don't Go Breaking My Heart"	Elton John and Kiki Dee
August 14	"Don't Go Breaking My Heart"	Elton John and Kiki Dee
August 21	"Don't Go Breaking My Heart"	Elton John and Kiki Dee
August 28	"Let 'Em In"	Wings
September 4	"You Should Be Dancing"	Bee Gees
September 11	"Play That Funky Music"	Wild Cherry
September 18	"Play That Funky Music"	Wild Cherry
September 25	"(Shake, Shake, Shake) Shake Your Booty"	K.C. & The Sunshine Band
October 2	"Lowdown"	Boz Scaggs
October 9	"A Fifth of Beethoven"	Walter Murphy and the Big Apple Band
October 16	“Disco Duck”	Rick Dees
October 23	"If You Leave Me Now"	Chicago
October 30	"Disco Duck”	Rick Dees
November 6	"Rock'n Me"	Steve Miller Band
November 13	"The Wreck Of The Edmund Fitzgerald"	Gordon Lightfoot
November 20	"Tonight's the Night (Gonna Be Alright)"	Rod Stewart
November 27	"Tonight's the Night (Gonna Be Alright)"	Rod Stewart
December 4	"Tonight's the Night (Gonna Be Alright)"	Rod Stewart
December 11	"Tonight's the Night (Gonna Be Alright)"	Rod Stewart
December 18	"Tonight's the Night (Gonna Be Alright)"	Rod Stewart
December 25	"You Make Me Feel Like Dancing"	Leo Sayer

== See also ==
- 1976 in music
- List of Hot 100 number-one singles of 1976 (U.S.)
