= List of RPM number-one easy listening singles of 1976 =

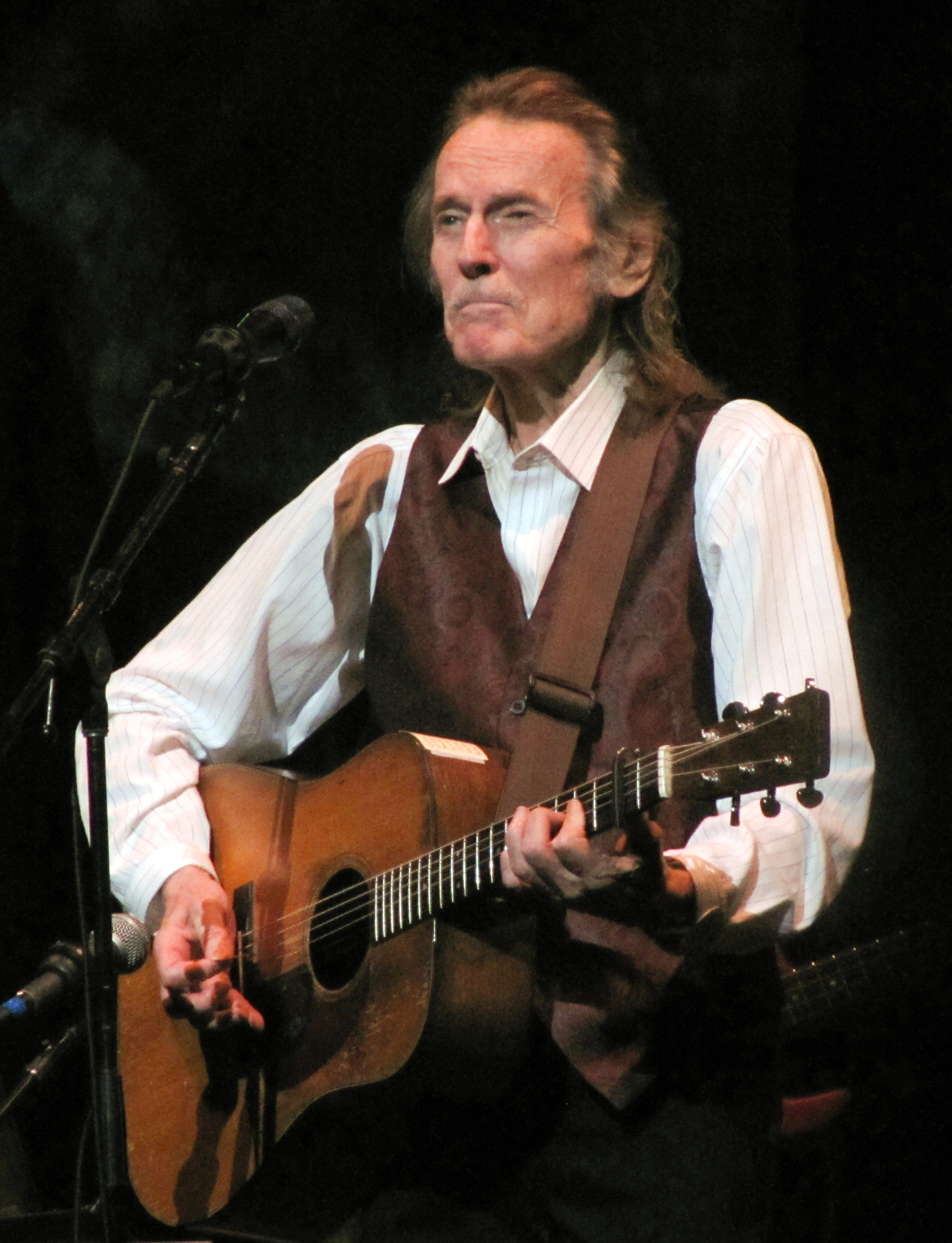
Canadian singer-songwriter Gordon Lightfoot (pictured in 2009) had the longest number-one easy listening chart run in 1976 at four weeks with "The Wreck of the Edmund Fitzgerald".

In 1976, RPM magazine published a chart for top-performing singles in the easy listening/middle-of-the-road categories in Canada. The chart, entitled Pop Music Playlist from January to May and MOR Playlist for the rest of 1976, has undergone numerous name changes, becoming Adult Oriented Playlist in 1977, Contemporary Adult in 1981 and finally Adult Contemporary in 1984 until the magazine's final publication in November 2000. In 1976, forty-one singles reached number one in the chart, which contains 50 positions. The first number-one in 1976 was "Something Better to Do" by English-Australian singer Olivia Newton-John, continuing from the 1975 charts, and the last was "Sorry Seems to Be the Hardest Word" by English musician Elton John. Twenty acts have their first number-one in the chart in 1976: Neil Sedaka, George Baker Selection, Paul Simon (formerly of Simon & Garfunkel), Eric Carmen (formerly of the Raspberries), the THP Orchestra, Gary Wright, the Bellamy Brothers, Maxine Nightingale, John Sebastian (formerly of the Lovin' Spoonful), Henry Gross, Wings, Johnny Cash, Starbuck, Enrico Farino, Kiki Dee, England Dan & John Ford Coley, War, Patsy Gallant, ABBA, Engelbert Humperdinck and Burton Cummings (formerly of the Guess Who). Five Canadian acts, the THP Orchestra, Enrico Farino, Gordon Lightfoot, Patsy Gallant and Burton Cummings had at least one number-one that year.

The longest-running single of the year was "The Wreck of the Edmund Fitzgerald" by the Canadian singer-songwriter Gordon Lightfoot, which spent four weeks at number one on the chart. Three acts had totalled three weeks at number one, including Captain & Tennille, Barry Manilow and Elton John.

== Chart history ==
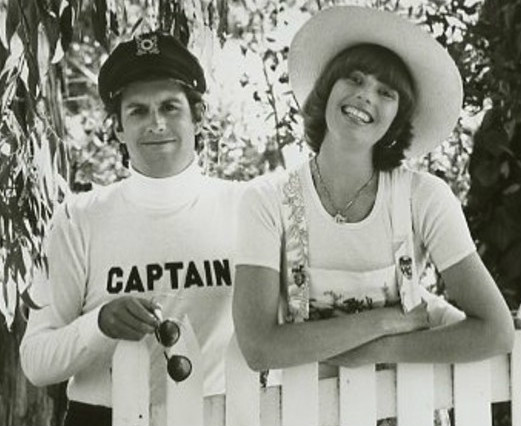
American pop duo Captain & Tennille had three number-one singles in the chart, with "Lonely Night (Angel Face)", "Shop Around" and "Muskrat Love", all from the album Song of Joy.

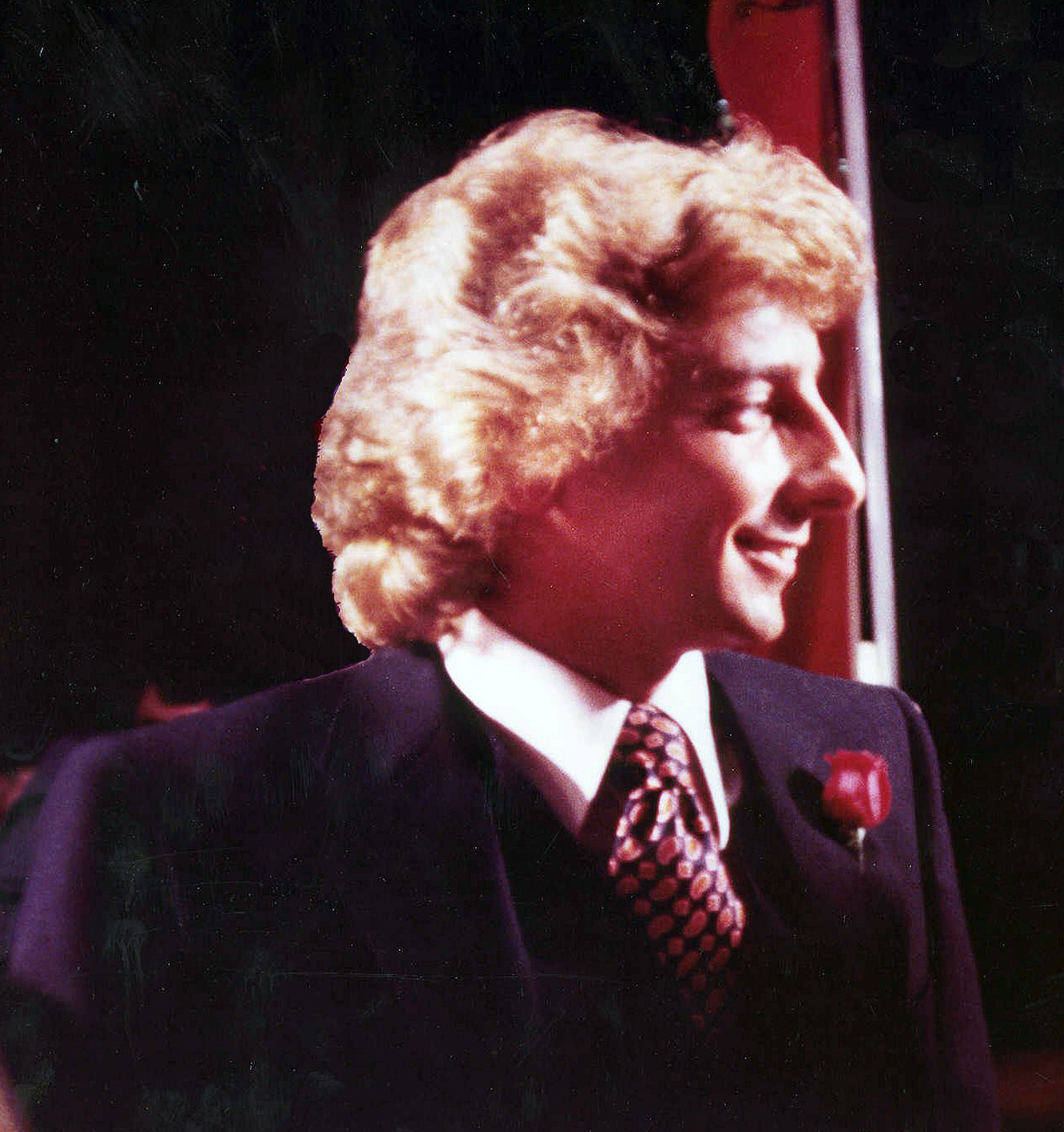
Barry Manilow had three number-ones in the chart, with "I Write the Songs", "Tryin' to Get the Feeling Again" and "This One's for You".

Chart history
Issue date	Title	Artist(s)	Ref.
January 3 (Note: Due to a week's break in publication for the 1975/1976 New Year period, the week of January 3 is inferred.)	"Something Better to Do"	Olivia Newton-John	
January 10	"I Write the Songs"	Barry Manilow	
January 17	"Country Boy (You Got Your Feet in L.A.)"	Glen Campbell	
January 24	"Let It Shine"	Olivia Newton-John	
January 31	"Breaking Up Is Hard to Do"	Neil Sedaka	
February 7	"Breaking Up Is Hard to Do"	Neil Sedaka	
February 14	"Breaking Up Is Hard to Do"	Neil Sedaka	
February 21	"Paloma Blanca"	George Baker Selection	
February 28	"50 Ways to Leave Your Lover"	Paul Simon	
March 6	"50 Ways to Leave Your Lover"	Paul Simon	
March 13	"50 Ways to Leave Your Lover"	Paul Simon	
March 20	"All by Myself"	Eric Carmen	
March 27	"Lonely Night (Angel Face)"	Captain & Tennille	
April 3	"Fanny (Be Tender with My Love)"	Bee Gees	
April 10	"Theme from S.W.A.T."	THP Orchestra	
April 17	"Dream Weaver"	Gary Wright	
April 24	"There's a Kind of Hush (All Over the World)"	The Carpenters	
May 1	"Let Your Love Flow"	The Bellamy Brothers	
May 8	"Right Back Where We Started From"	Maxine Nightingale	
May 15	"Tryin' to Get the Feeling Again"	Barry Manilow	
May 22	"Welcome Back Kotter"	John Sebastian	
May 28	"Welcome Back Kotter"	John Sebastian	
June 5	"Shannon"	Henry Gross	
June 12	"Silly Love Songs"	Wings	
June 19	"Shop Around"	Captain & Tennille	
June 26	"Never Gonna Fall in Love Again"	Eric Carmen	
July 3	"One Piece at a Time"	Johnny Cash	
July 10	"Moonlight Feels Right"	Starbuck	
July 17	"Get Closer"	Seals & Crofts	
July 24	"Let Me Love You Forever"	Enrico Farino	
July 31	"I Need to Be in Love"	The Carpenters	
August 7	"If You Know What I Mean"	Neil Diamond	
August 14	"Another Rainy Day in New York City"	Chicago	
August 21	"Let 'Em In"	Wings	
August 28	"Don't Go Breaking My Heart"	Elton John and Kiki Dee	
September 4	"I'd Really Love to See You Tonight"	England Dan & John Ford Coley	
September 11	"Shower the People"	James Taylor	
September 18	"Summer"	War	
September 25	"The Wreck of the Edmund Fitzgerald"	Gordon Lightfoot	
October 2	"The Wreck of the Edmund Fitzgerald"	Gordon Lightfoot	
October 9	"The Wreck of the Edmund Fitzgerald"	Gordon Lightfoot	
October 16	"The Wreck of the Edmund Fitzgerald"	Gordon Lightfoot	
October 23	"From New York to L.A."	Patsy Gallant	
October 30	"From New York to L.A."	Patsy Gallant	
November 6	"Fernando"	ABBA	
November 13	"Muskrat Love"	Captain & Tennille	
November 20	"Ciao Ciao Bambina"	Enrico Farino	
November 27	"This One's for You"	Barry Manilow	
December 4	"After the Lovin'"	Engelbert Humperdinck	
December 11	"Stand Tall"	Burton Cummings	
December 18	"Sorry Seems to Be the Hardest Word"	Elton John	
December 25	"Sorry Seems to Be the Hardest Word"	Elton John	
