= Billboard Year-End Hot Soul Singles of 1976 =

American music chart

This is a list of Billboard magazine's Top Hot Soul Singles of 1976.

| No. | Title | Artist(s) |
|---|---|---|
| 1 | "Disco Lady" | Johnnie Taylor |
| 2 | "Something He Can Feel" | Aretha Franklin |
| 3 | "Kiss and Say Goodbye" | The Manhattans |
| 4 | "(Shake, Shake, Shake) Shake Your Booty" | KC and the Sunshine Band |
| 5 | "You'll Never Find Another Love Like Mine" | Lou Rawls |
| 6 | "Getaway" | Earth, Wind & Fire |
| 7 | "Misty Blue" | Dorothy Moore |
| 8 | "Sing a Song" | Earth, Wind & Fire |
| 9 | "Sweet Thing" | Rufus featuring Chaka Khan |
| 10 | "Boogie Fever" | The Sylvers |
| 11 | "Wake Up Everybody" | Harold Melvin & the Blue Notes |
| 12 | "Play That Funky Music" | Wild Cherry |
| 13 | "Young Hearts Run Free" | Candi Staton |
| 14 | "Turning Point" | Tyrone Davis |
| 15 | "Sophisticated Lady (She's a Different Lady)" | Natalie Cole |
| 16 | "Heaven Must Be Missing an Angel" | Tavares |
| 17 | "Who'd She Coo?" | Ohio Players |
| 18 | "I Love Music" | The O'Jays |
| 19 | "Get Up Offa That Thing" | James Brown |
| 20 | "Livin' for the Weekend" / "Stairway to Heaven" | The O'Jays |
| 21 | "Sweet Love" | Commodores |
| 22 | "Walk Away from Love" | David Ruffin |
| 23 | "Love Hangover" | Diana Ross |
| 24 | "Movin'" | Brass Construction |
| 25 | "Theme from S.W.A.T." | Rhythm Heritage |
| 26 | "Inseparable" | Natalie Cole |
| 27 | "This Masquerade" | George Benson |
| 28 | "I'll Be Good to You" | The Brothers Johnson |
| 29 | "Love Machine" | The Miracles |
| 30 | "Let's Do It Again" | The Staple Singers |
| 31 | "Get Up and Boogie" | Silver Convention |
| 32 | "You Sexy Thing" | Hot Chocolate |
| 33 | "It's Cool" | The Tymes |
| 34 | "I Want You" | Marvin Gaye |
| 35 | "Love Rollercoaster" | Ohio Players |
| 36 | "Full of Fire" | Al Green |
| 37 | "I've Got a Feeling (We'll Be Seeing Each Other Again)" | Al Wilson |
| 38 | "He's a Friend" | Eddie Kendricks |
| 39 | "The More You Do It (The More I Like It Done To Me)" | Ronnie Dyson |
| 40 | "Who Loves You Better" | The Isley Brothers |
| 41 | "Give Up the Funk (Tear the Roof off the Sucker)" | Parliament |
| 42 | "Hard Work" | John Handy |
| 43 | "Once You Hit the Road" | Dionne Warwick |
| 44 | "From Us to You" | The Stairsteps |
| 45 | "Can't Stop Groovin' Now, Wanna Do It Some More" | B. T. Express |
| 46 | "Lowdown" | Boz Scaggs |
| 47 | "Happy Music" | The Blackbyrds |
| 48 | "Summer" | War |
| 49 | "The Lonely One" | Terry Huff and Special Delivery |
| 50 | "Somebody's Gettin' It" | Johnnie Taylor |

== See also ==
- 1976 in music
- Billboard Year-End Hot 100 singles of 1976
- List of Hot Soul Singles number ones of 1976
