= List of Hot Soul Singles number ones of 1976 =

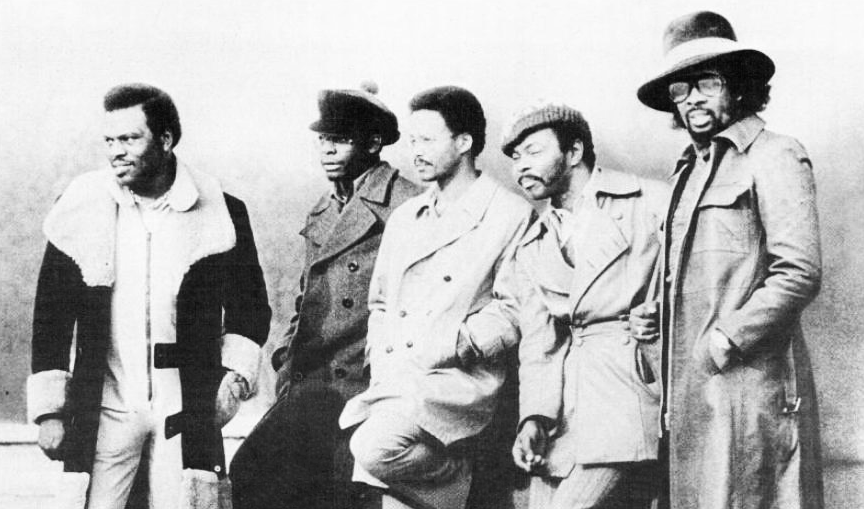
"Kiss and Say Goodbye" was a chart-topper in 1976 for the Manhattans.

Billboard published a weekly chart in 1976 ranking the top-performing singles in the United States in soul music and related African American-oriented genres; the chart has undergone various name changes over the decades to reflect the evolution of black music and since 2005 has been published as Hot R&B/Hip-Hop Songs. In 1976, it was published under the title Hot Soul Singles, and 29 different singles reached number one.

Natalie Cole and the band Earth, Wind & Fire were the only two acts to achieve multiple number ones during the year; both acts had two chart-toppers. "Disco Lady" by Johnnie Taylor was the year's longest-running number one, spending six consecutive weeks in the top spot. This also made Taylor the act with the highest total number of weeks atop the chart during the year, ahead of four acts which each spent four weeks at number one. "Disco Lady" was among eight of 1976's soul number ones which also topped Billboard's pop singles chart, the Hot 100, mostly those in the disco genre which was beginning to dominate American popular music and culture. "Boogie Fever" by the Sylvers, "Love Hangover" by Diana Ross, "Kiss and Say Goodbye" by the Manhattans, "(Shake, Shake, Shake) Shake Your Booty" by KC & the Sunshine Band, "Play That Funky Music" by Wild Cherry, "You Don't Have to Be a Star (To Be in My Show)" by Marilyn McCoo and Billy Davis Jr., and "Car Wash" by Rose Royce also reached the top of both listings. In contrast, "Turning Point" by Tyrone Davis spent a week at number one on the soul singles chart in February but failed to enter the Hot 100 at all, the first time this had occurred since the Hot 100 was launched in 1958.

A number of acts topped the chart in 1976 for the first time in their respective careers, including the band Brick, which spent four weeks at number one with the track "Dazz", named for the band's fusion of disco and jazz. David Ruffin, who had topped the chart as a member of the Temptations, gained his first and only solo number one in January with "Walk Away from Love". Marilyn McCoo and Billy Davis Jr. topped the chart for the first time in November, one position higher than they had reached as members of the 5th Dimension. The Manhattans and Lou Rawls both reached number one for the first time ten years after they first entered the chart. The Sylvers, Brass Construction, Candi Staton, the Brothers Johnson, Wild Cherry, and L.T.D. all also made their first appearances at the top of the chart in 1976, as did Rose Royce, who had the final number one of the year.

== Chart history ==
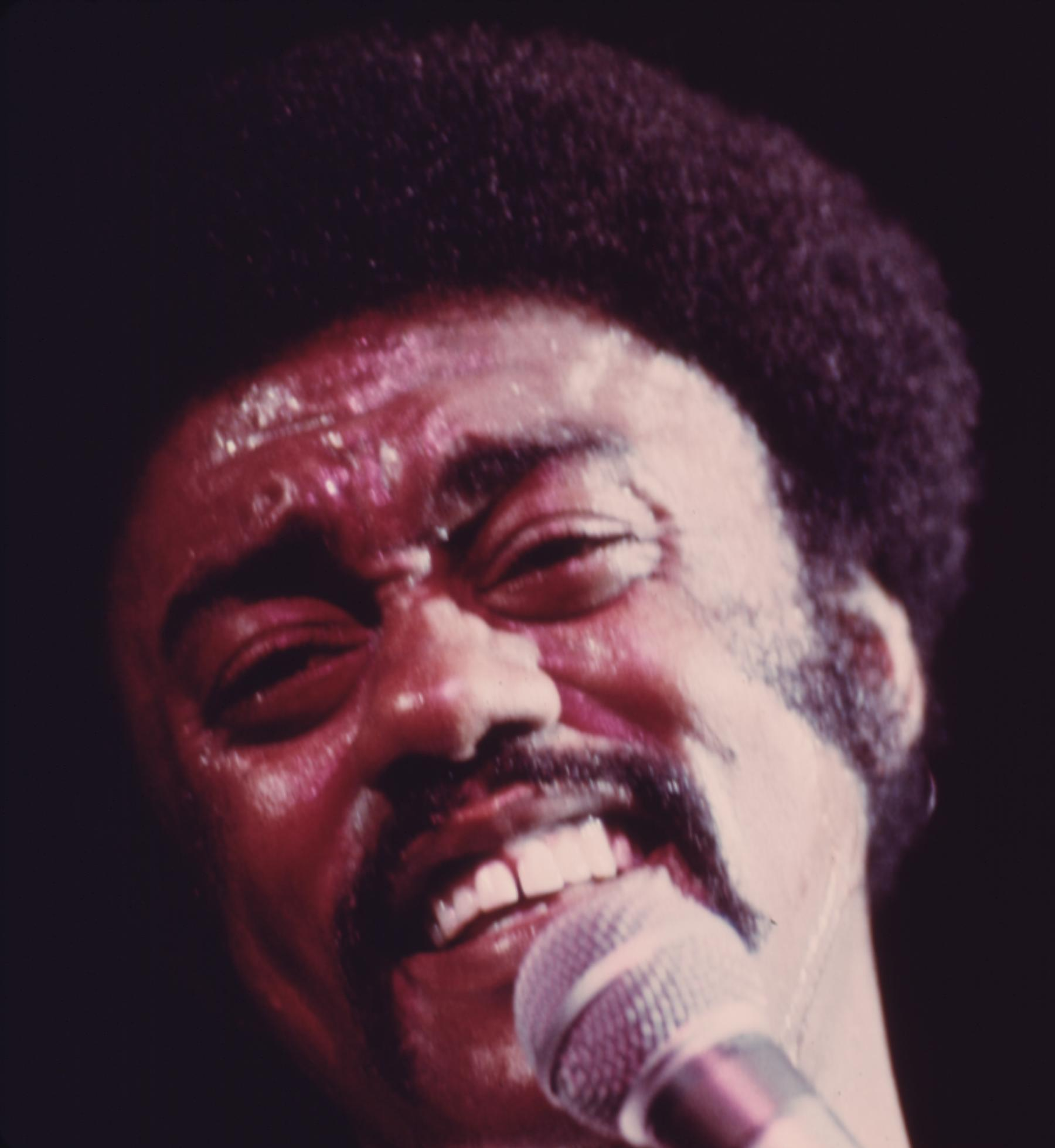
Johnnie Taylor's "Disco Lady" was the year's longest-running number one.

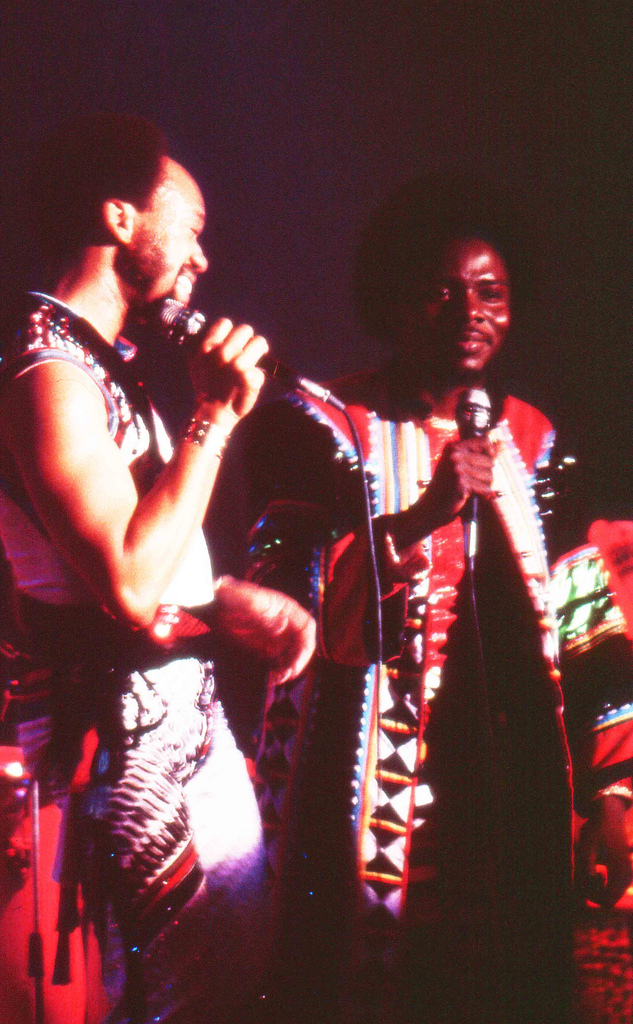
Earth, Wind & Fire had two number ones in 1976.

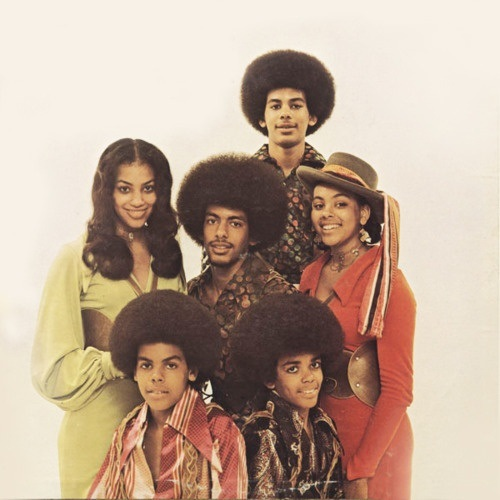
Family ensemble the Sylvers topped both the soul chart and the Hot 100 with "Boogie Fever".

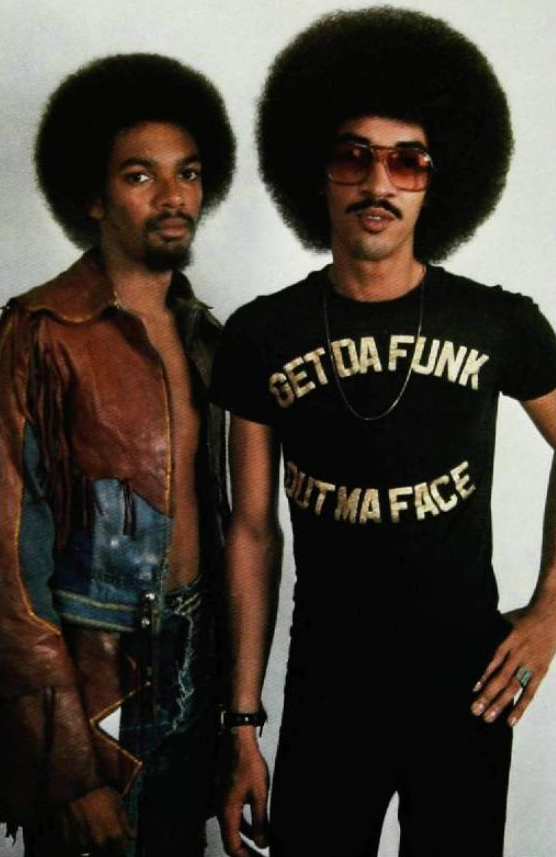
"I'll Be Good to You" was the first chart-topper for the Brothers Johnson.

Key
†	Indicates number 1 on Billboard's year-end soul chart

Chart history
Issue date	Title	Artist(s)	Ref.
January 3	"Walk Away from Love"	David Ruffin	
January 10	"Sing a Song"	Earth, Wind & Fire	
January 17	"Wake Up Everybody (Part 1)"	Harold Melvin & the Blue Notes	
January 24	"Wake Up Everybody (Part 1)"	Harold Melvin & the Blue Notes	
January 31	"Sing a Song"	Earth, Wind & Fire	
February 7	"Turning Point"	Tyrone Davis	
February 14	"Inseparable"	Natalie Cole	
February 21	"Sweet Thing"	Rufus featuring Chaka Khan	
February 28	"Sweet Thing"	Rufus featuring Chaka Khan	
March 6	"Boogie Fever"	The Sylvers	
March 13	"Disco Lady" †	Johnnie Taylor	
March 20	"Disco Lady" †	Johnnie Taylor	
March 27	"Disco Lady" †	Johnnie Taylor	
April 3	"Disco Lady" †	Johnnie Taylor	
April 10	"Disco Lady" †	Johnnie Taylor	
April 17	"Disco Lady" †	Johnnie Taylor	
April 24	"Livin' for the Weekend" / "Stairway to Heaven"	The O'Jays	
May 1	"Livin' for the Weekend" / "Stairway to Heaven"	The O'Jays	
May 8	"Movin'"	Brass Construction	
May 15	"Love Hangover"	Diana Ross	
May 22	"Kiss and Say Goodbye"	The Manhattans	
May 29	"I Want You"	Marvin Gaye	
June 5	"Young Hearts Run Free"	Candi Staton	
June 12	"I'll Be Good to You"	The Brothers Johnson	
June 19	"Sophisticated Lady (She's a Different Lady)"	Natalie Cole	
June 26	"Something He Can Feel"	Aretha Franklin	
July 3	"Something He Can Feel"	Aretha Franklin	
July 10	"Something He Can Feel"	Aretha Franklin	
July 17	"Something He Can Feel"	Aretha Franklin	
July 24	"You'll Never Find Another Love Like Mine"	Lou Rawls	
July 31	"You'll Never Find Another Love Like Mine"	Lou Rawls	
August 7	"Getaway"	Earth, Wind & Fire	
August 14	"Getaway"	Earth, Wind & Fire	
August 21	"Who'd She Coo?"	The Ohio Players	
August 28	"(Shake, Shake, Shake) Shake Your Booty"	KC & the Sunshine Band	
September 4	"Play That Funky Music"	Wild Cherry	
September 11	"Play That Funky Music"	Wild Cherry	
September 18	"(Shake, Shake, Shake) Shake Your Booty"	KC & the Sunshine Band	
September 25	"(Shake, Shake, Shake) Shake Your Booty"	KC & the Sunshine Band	
October 2	"(Shake, Shake, Shake) Shake Your Booty"	KC & the Sunshine Band	
October 9	"Just to Be Close to You"	Commodores	
October 16	"Just to Be Close to You"	Commodores	
October 23	"The Rubberband Man"	The Spinners	
October 30	"Message in Our Music"	The O'Jays	
November 6	"Love Ballad"	L.T.D.	
November 13	"Love Ballad"	L.T.D.	
November 20	"You Don't Have to Be a Star (To Be in My Show)"	Marilyn McCoo and Billy Davis Jr.	
November 27	"Dazz"	Brick	
December 4	"Dazz"	Brick	
December 11	"Dazz"	Brick	
December 18	"Dazz"	Brick	
December 25	"Car Wash"	Rose Royce	

== See also ==
- Billboard Year-End Hot Soul Singles of 1976
- List of Billboard Hot 100 number-one singles of 1976
