= List of Billboard Hot 100 number ones of 1976 =

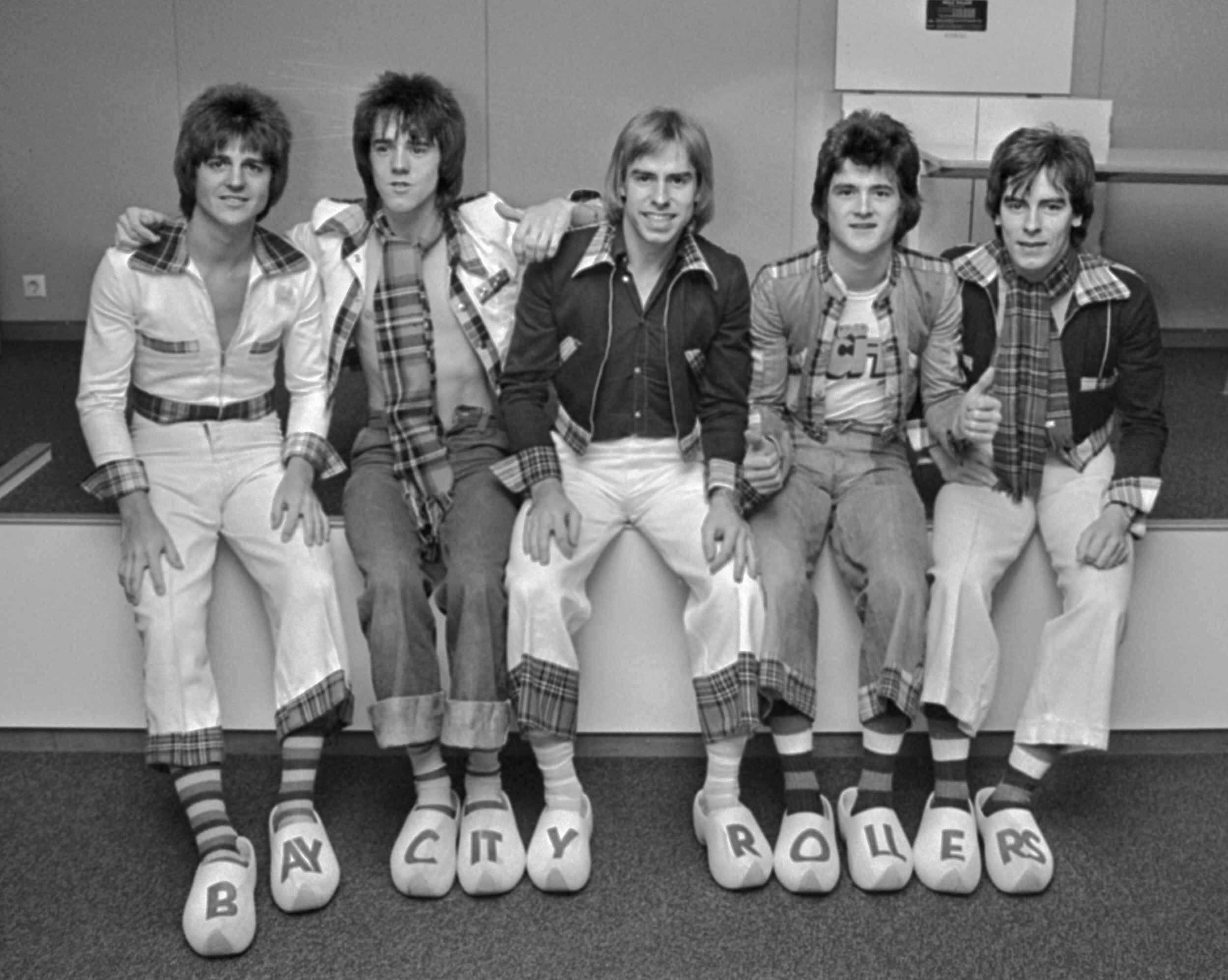
The Bay City Rollers topped the Hot 100 for the first time in 1976.

The Billboard Hot 100 is a chart published since August 1958 by Billboard magazine which ranks the best-performing singles in the United States. In 1976, it was compiled based on a combination of sales and airplay data sourced from surveys of retail outlets and playlists submitted by radio stations respectively. During the year, 26 different singles spent time at number one.

In the issue of Billboard dated January 3, the Bay City Rollers gained their first Hot 100 number one with "Saturday Night". The Scottish band had achieved a string of top 10 singles in the UK between 1971 and 1975, including two number ones, accompanied by a fan frenzy dubbed "Rollermania", but they had not achieved any success in the United States until "Saturday Night" entered the Hot 100 in October 1975. After one week atop the chart, the single was displaced by "Convoy" by C. W. McCall, who likewise achieved his first number one. In February, Paul Simon, who had topped the chart three times as one half of Simon & Garfunkel, gained his first solo number one with "50 Ways to Leave Your Lover". John Sebastian, who had achieved one number one as the lead singer of the Lovin' Spoonful, similarly gained his first solo chart-topper with "Welcome Back", the theme song from the television comedy Welcome Back, Kotter. Rhythm Heritage, Johnnie Taylor, the Bellamy Brothers, and the Sylvers all achieved their first and only Hot 100 number ones in the first half of the year. Taylor had first charted in 1963 but took more than a decade to reach the top spot.

Several of 1976's number ones were from the disco genre, which was booming in popularity. Two Motown acts, the Miracles and Diana Ross, adopted the disco style on "Love Machine (Part 1)" and "Love Hangover", respectively. The Bee Gees reached number one with the disco song "You Should Be Dancing"; the trio had begun to experiment with the genre in 1975 and became strongly associated with it in the second half of the 1970s. Walter Murphy and the Big Apple Band topped the chart with "A Fifth of Beethoven", a disco reworking of themes from Ludwig van Beethoven's "Symphony No. 5", and the radio personality Rick Dees reached number one with the novelty song "Disco Duck", credited to Rick Dees and His Cast of Idiots; neither Murphy nor Dees achieved any other top 40 entries. Starland Vocal Band, the Manhattans, Wild Cherry, and Chicago all reached number one for the first time in the second half of the year, as did Kiki Dee, who gained her only U.S. number one when she duetted with Elton John on "Don't Go Breaking My Heart". Like Taylor earlier in the year, it had taken the Manhattans more than ten years from their chart debut to reach the top of the chart. The final number one of 1976 was also the year's longest-running chart-topper. "Tonight's the Night (Gonna Be Alright)" by Rod Stewart reached the top spot in the issue of Billboard dated November 13 and remained there for the rest of the year for a year-end total of seven weeks at number one. This also made Stewart the act with the most weeks atop the listing during 1976. Ross was the only act to have more than one song reach number one during the year, topping the chart with both "Theme from Mahogany (Do You Know Where You're Going To)" and "Love Hangover", but she only spent a total of three weeks in the peak position.

== Chart history ==
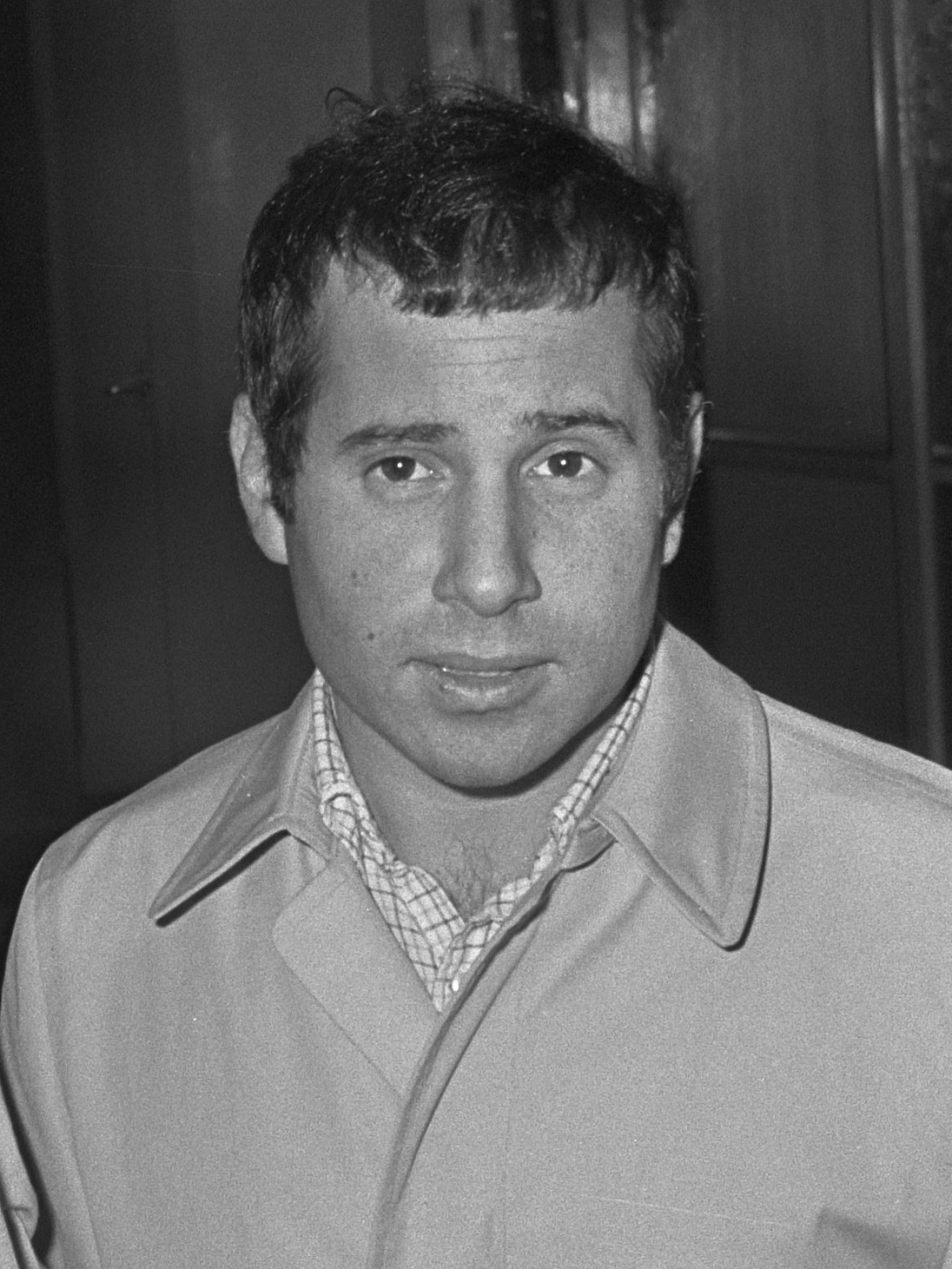
"50 Ways to Leave Your Lover" was the first solo number one for Paul Simon.

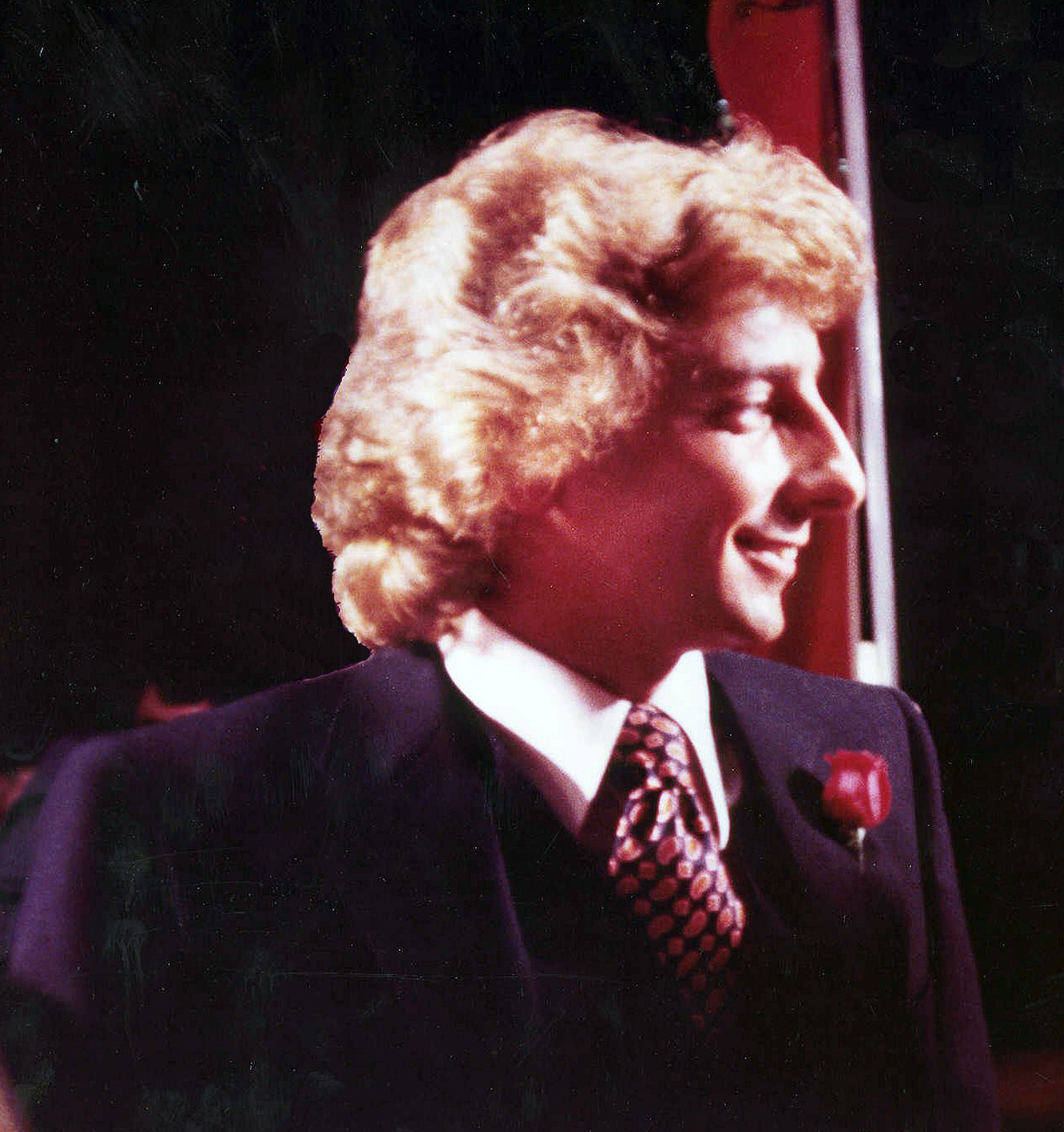
"I Write the Songs" was a chart-topper for Barry Manilow.

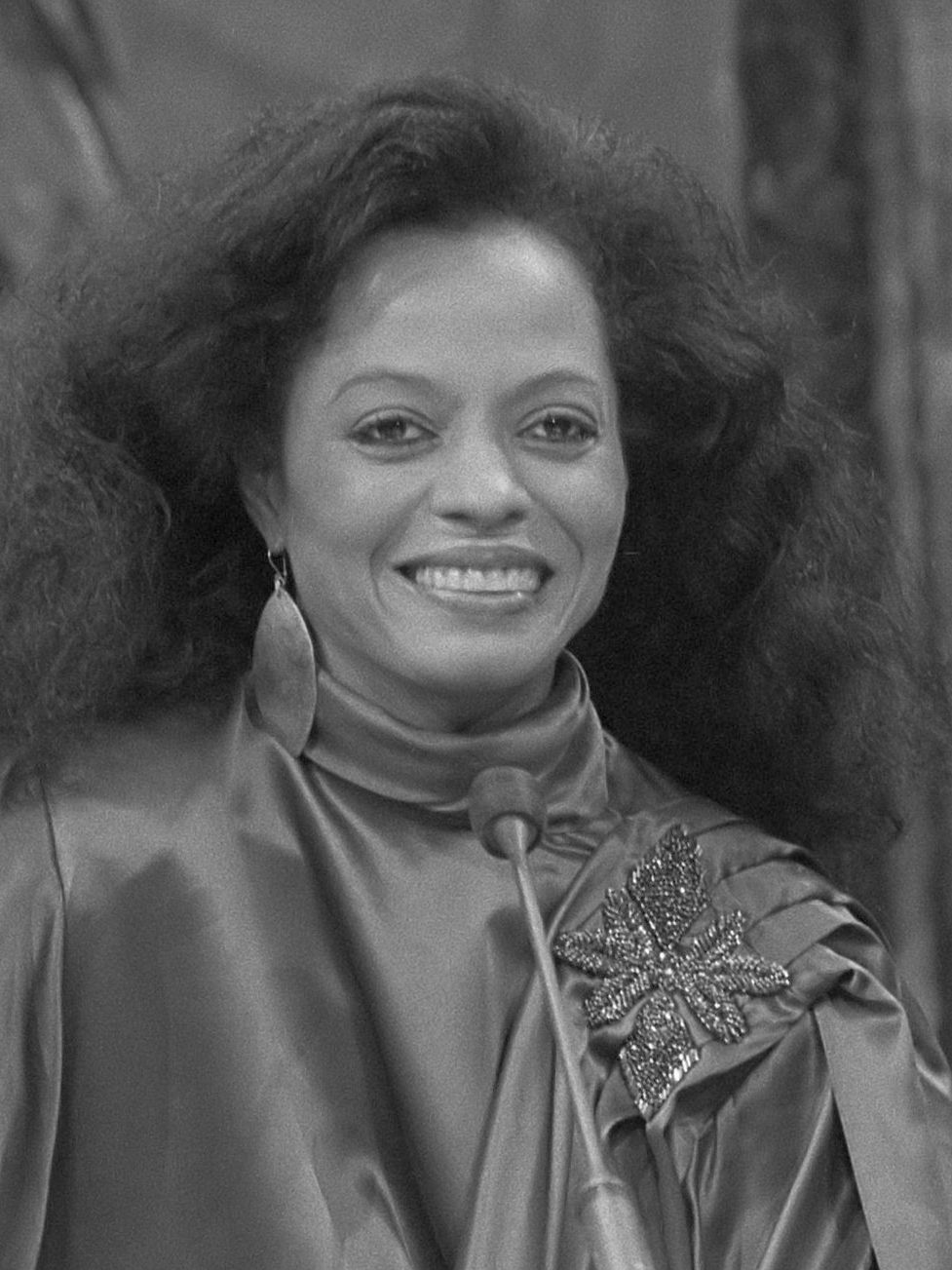
Diana Ross was the only act with more than one number one in 1976.

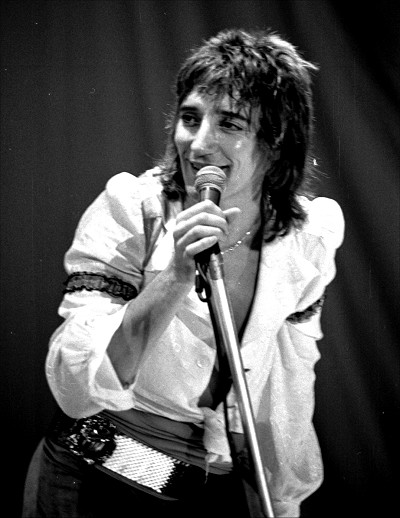
Rod Stewart ended the year at number one with "Tonight's the Night (Gonna Be Alright)".

Chart history
No. (Note: The "No." column indicates the numerical sequence of number ones in Hot 100 history. "Re" indicates a single returning to number one.)	Issue date	Title	Artist(s)	Ref.
384	January 3	"Saturday Night"	Bay City Rollers	
385	January 10	"Convoy"	C. W. McCall	
386	January 17	"I Write the Songs"	Barry Manilow	
387	January 24	"Theme from Mahogany (Do You Know Where You're Going To)"	Diana Ross	
388	January 31	"Love Rollercoaster"	Ohio Players	
389	February 7	"50 Ways to Leave Your Lover"	Paul Simon	
389	February 14	"50 Ways to Leave Your Lover"	Paul Simon	
389	February 21	"50 Ways to Leave Your Lover"	Paul Simon	
390	February 28	"Theme from S.W.A.T."	Rhythm Heritage	
391	March 6	"Love Machine (Part 1)"	The Miracles	
392	March 13	"December, 1963 (Oh, What a Night)"	The Four Seasons	
392	March 20	"December, 1963 (Oh, What a Night)"	The Four Seasons	
392	March 27	"December, 1963 (Oh, What a Night)"	The Four Seasons	
393	April 3	"Disco Lady"	Johnnie Taylor	
393	April 10	"Disco Lady"	Johnnie Taylor	
393	April 17	"Disco Lady"	Johnnie Taylor	
393	April 24	"Disco Lady"	Johnnie Taylor	
394	May 1	"Let Your Love Flow"	The Bellamy Brothers	
395	May 8	"Welcome Back"	John Sebastian	
396	May 15	"Boogie Fever"	The Sylvers	
397	May 22	"Silly Love Songs"	Wings	
398	May 29	"Love Hangover"	Diana Ross	
398	June 5	"Love Hangover"	Diana Ross	
397 (re)	June 12	"Silly Love Songs"	Wings	
397 (re)	June 19	"Silly Love Songs"	Wings	
397 (re)	June 26	"Silly Love Songs"	Wings	
397 (re)	July 4 (Note: This issue of Billboard was dated July 4, 1976, one day later than would be the norm.)	"Silly Love Songs"	Wings	
399	July 10	"Afternoon Delight"	Starland Vocal Band	
399	July 17	"Afternoon Delight"	Starland Vocal Band	
400	July 24	"Kiss and Say Goodbye"	The Manhattans	
400	July 31	"Kiss and Say Goodbye"	The Manhattans	
401	August 7	"Don't Go Breaking My Heart"	Elton John and Kiki Dee	
401	August 14	"Don't Go Breaking My Heart"	Elton John and Kiki Dee	
401	August 21	"Don't Go Breaking My Heart"	Elton John and Kiki Dee	
401	August 28	"Don't Go Breaking My Heart"	Elton John and Kiki Dee	
402	September 4	"You Should Be Dancing"	Bee Gees	
403	September 11	"(Shake, Shake, Shake) Shake Your Booty"	KC and the Sunshine Band	
404	September 18	"Play That Funky Music"	Wild Cherry	
404	September 25	"Play That Funky Music"	Wild Cherry	
404	October 2	"Play That Funky Music"	Wild Cherry	
405	October 9	"A Fifth of Beethoven"	Walter Murphy and the Big Apple Band	
406	October 16	"Disco Duck"	Rick Dees and His Cast of Idiots	
407	October 23	"If You Leave Me Now"	Chicago	
407	October 30	"If You Leave Me Now"	Chicago	
408	November 6	"Rock'n Me"	Steve Miller Band	
409	November 13	"Tonight's the Night (Gonna Be Alright)"	Rod Stewart	
409	November 20	"Tonight's the Night (Gonna Be Alright)"	Rod Stewart	
409	November 27	"Tonight's the Night (Gonna Be Alright)"	Rod Stewart	
409	December 4	"Tonight's the Night (Gonna Be Alright)"	Rod Stewart	
409	December 11	"Tonight's the Night (Gonna Be Alright)"	Rod Stewart	
409	December 18	"Tonight's the Night (Gonna Be Alright)"	Rod Stewart	
409	December 25	"Tonight's the Night (Gonna Be Alright)"	Rod Stewart	

== Number-one artists ==
List of number-one artists by total weeks at number one
Weeks at No. 1	Artist
7	Rod Stewart
5	Wings
4	Johnnie Taylor
4	Elton John
4	Kiki Dee
3	Paul Simon
3	The Four Seasons
3	Diana Ross
3	Wild Cherry
2	Starland Vocal Band
2	The Manhattans
2	Chicago
1	Bay City Rollers
1	C. W. McCall
1	Barry Manilow
1	Ohio Players
1	Rhythm Heritage
1	The Miracles
1	The Bellamy Brothers
1	John Sebastian
1	The Sylvers
1	Bee Gees
1	KC and the Sunshine Band
1	Walter Murphy and the Big Apple Band
1	Rick Dees and His Cast of Idiots
1	Steve Miller Band

== See also ==
- 1976 in music
- List of Cash Box Top 100 number-one singles of 1976
- List of Billboard Hot 100 number-one singles of the 1970s
