= The Original Disco Duck =

1977 studio album by Rick Dees

Studio album by Rick Dees and His Cast of Idiots
- Released: 1977
- Recorded: 1976
- Studio: Shoe Productions Studio, Memphis, Tennessee, United States; Ardent Studios, Memphis, Tennessee, United States (overdubs); Clover Studios, Los Angeles, California, United States (overdubs)
- Genre: Disco, novelty
- Length: 36:05
- Language: English
- Label: RSO
- Producer: Bobby Manuel

The Original Disco Duck is the debut album by American DJ Rick Dees, released in 1977, and includes the hit single "Disco Duck".

== Critical reception ==
The editorial board of AllMusic Guide gave this album four out of five stars, with reviewer JT Griffith calling it "a fun novelty record, but not a classic comedy album". Rolling Stone gave the release one star out of five. Billboard declared the album an "utterly inane disk that does not lack charm and merit".

Record World said that the second single "Dis-Gorilla" was "every bit as outrageous [as 'Disco Duck'] and could be every bit the hit." "Dis-Gorilla" did not repeat the success of "Disco Duck", only reaching #56 on the Billboard Hot 100.

== Track listing ==
1. "Disco Duck (Part I Vocal)" (Rick Dees) – 3:10
2. "Barely White (That'll Get It Baby)" (Dees and Bobby Manuel) – 3:45
3. "Bionic Feet" (Dees and Manuel) – 3:12
4. "Flick the Bick" (Dees and Manuel) – 4:54
5. "Disco Duck (Part II Instrumental)" (Mark Blumberg, Manuel, and Lester Snell) – 3:03
6. "Dis-Gorilla" (Shelly N. Fisher, Willie Hall, and Manuel) – 3:05
7. "Doctor Disco" (Dees and Manuel) – 4:50
8. "Bad Shark" (Earl Donelson, Filson Bryant Hawkes, Manuel, James McGehee, Snell, and Peter Vescovo) – 4:17
9. "He Ate Too Many Jelly Donuts" (Dees) – 3:02
10. "The Peanut Prance" (Dees, Margaret Kerr, and Manuel) – 2:47

== Personnel ==
- Rick Dees – vocals
- Andy Black – recording
- Scott Blake – backing vocals
- Mark Blumberg – horn and string arrangements
- William Brown – backing vocals
- Diane Davis – backing vocals
- Helen Duncan – backing vocals and percussion
- Phyliss Duncan – backing vocals and percussion
- David Foster – ARP synthesizer
- Jay Grayden – ARP programming
- Ray Griffin – bass guitar
- Willie Hall – drums and percussion
- Susan Herr – art direction
- Jim Kirk – photography
- Johnny Lee – illustration
- Pat Lewis – backing vocals
- Bobby Manuel – lead and rhythm guitar, percussion, production
- Carl Marsh – backing vocals
- The Memphis Horns – horns
  - Ben Cauley
  - Lewis Collins, Jr.
  - Charles Findley
  - Jack Hale
  - Dick Hyde
  - J. J. Kelson, Jr.
  - Andrew Love
  - Don Menza
  - James Mitchell
- The Memphis Symphony – strings
- Gimmer Nicholson – rhythm guitar and slide guitar
- Tom Nikosey – design and typography
- Larry Nix – mastering at Ardent Mastering, Memphis, Tennessee, United States
- Ken Pruitt – backing vocals
- Swain Schaeffer – piano
- Lester Snell – clavinet, electric piano, horn and string arrangements
- Moog-Winston Stewart – ARP programming
- Jerry "Joker" Thompson – assistant engineering
- Warren Wagner – recording and remixing at Hollywood Sound Recorders, Hollywood, California, United States
- Rose Williams – backing vocals

== See also ==
- List of 1977 albums
