= I Got to Know =

- One of side-A labels of the US single

Single by Starbuck

from the album Moonlight Feels Right
- B-side: "The Slower You Go (The Longer It Lasts)"
- Released: September 1976
- Recorded: 1975
- Genre: Soft rock
- Length: 3:08
- Label: Private Stock
- Songwriter: Bruce Blackman
- Producer: Bruce Blackman

Starbuck singles chronology
"Moonlight Feels Right" (1976)	"I Got to Know" (1976)	"Lucky Man " (1976)

"I Got to Know" is a song recorded by the American band Starbuck. It was the second of three singles from their debut LP, Moonlight Feels Right. Written and produced by Bruce Blackman, the song was released in September 1976. Like its predecessor, "Moonlight Feels Right," the song features a prominent marimba solo by co-founding band member Bo Wagner.

In the United States, the song reached number 43 on the Billboard Hot 100 and number 40 on the Cash Box chart. On the Canadian chart, the song peaked at number 36 in late October 1976. On the adult contemporary charts, "I Got to Know" reached number 11 in the U.S. and number nine in Canada.

== Television performance ==
Starbuck performed their debut hit, "Moonlight Feels Right" and "I Got to Know" on The Midnight Special television program on July 23, 1976 (season 4, episode 37). The show was hosted by The Spinners.

== Chart history ==
Chart (1976)	Peak position
Canada RPM Adult Contemporary	9
Canada RPM Top Singles	36
U.S. Billboard Hot 100	43
U.S. Billboard Easy Listening	11
U.S. Cash Box Top 100	40
