= Tobias Hug =

German singer and beatboxer

- Born: Tobias Rafael Hug; 1 January 1976; Freiburg, Germany
- Died: 9 January 2020 (aged 44); Freiburg, Germany
- Other names: Tobi; BFG (Black Forest Ghetto)
- Education: Musikhochschule Trossingen; Royal Academy of Music, Aarhus
- Occupations: Singer, beatboxer, music arranger, singing coach, judge

Tobias Hug (1 January 1976 – 9 January 2020) was a German a cappella singer, beatboxer, coach and judge. He was the first German member of a cappella group, The Swingle Singers (now called 'The Swingles') and one of its longest serving members, performing with them for 11 years. Hug founded the a cappella festival Black Forest Voices in 2019.

Together with the Hong Kong Federation of Youth Groups (HKFYG), Hug entered the Guinness World Records in 2017 for arranging the world's largest beatbox choir. Hug's arrangement of Walter Murphy's A Fifth of Beethoven, recorded by The Swingles featured in the pilot episode of Glee.

== Early life and education ==
Tobias Rafael Hug was born in Freiburg im Breisgau, Germany. He initially pursued a career in anthropology. At 23 he studied music education, with a principal study in French horn, at Musikhochschule Trossingen, where he set up his first a cappella group. Hug was a member of Jazzchor Freiburg, the a cappella group SiX and the State Youth Big Band of Baden-Wuerttemberg. He moved to London in 2001 to join the Swingle Singers. He earned an MA in Rhythmic Choir Conducting and Vocal Leadership from the Royal Academy of Music, Aarhus, Denmark.

== The Swingle Singers ==
Hug was a member of the Swingle Singers (now known as The Swingles) from 2001 until 2012. He was one of the group's longest serving members and its first German singer. He was the group's artistic director from 2008 to 2010, and arranged multiple collaborations, including with Zubin Mehta and the Vienna Philharmonic. With The Swingles he recorded six studio albums and performed in over 700 concerts around the world. Hug's arrangement of Walter Murphy's A Fifth of Beethoven was the first track of the Swingles' 2007 album Beauty and the Beatbox, released by Signum Classics. This recording appeared in the pilot episode of Glee, which first aired on Fox on 19 May 2009. Hug and the Swingle Singers appeared in the award-winning 2010 advert Welcome Home for T-Mobile UK.

In a 2012 BBC Radio 3 interview as part of the 2012 London A Cappella Festival, when "asked how long one could remain as a Swingle Singer", Hug responded that "touring takes a toll." He announced his retirement from the group the same day.

=== Beatbox Choir ===
In 2008, together with Shlomo, Hug created the world's first Beatbox Choir, which appeared at the International Beatbox Convention at the Southbank Centre.

== After the Swingle Singers ==
Hug left the Swingles in 2012 to focus on coaching, judging, performing and managing groups and events. In these roles he travelled extensively, including to Hong Kong, Taiwan, Singapore, Croatia, Denmark, Estonia, France, Greece, Italy, Norway, Sweden, America and Kenya.

=== Festivals ===
Hug was involved in the establishment of the following vocal festivals and organisations:

- 2010: London A Cappella Festival (UK) – co-founder
- 2011: European Voices Association (Denmark) – founding member
- 2014 – 2016: Fossano Musica Foundation's a cappella festival Vocalamente (Italy) – founding artistic director
- 2019: Black Forest Voices (Germany) an annual a cappella festival based in Kirchzarten, where he spent his youth – founder

=== Hong Kong Federation of Youth Groups (HKFYG) ===
In June 2017 Hug worked with HKFYG to create the Concert of Ten Thousand Voices at the Hong Kong Coliseum. As part of the event, they entered the Guinness World Records for creating "the largest human beatbox performance".

=== Collaborations and groups ===
Hug collaborated with many musicians, including Bobby McFerrin (whom he joined on the VOCAbuLarieS tour), Katia Labèque, Tiefschwartz, New York Voices, Shlomo, Zap Mama and The Puppini Sisters. As a member of London Voices, Hug appeared on several soundtracks, including Star Wars, The Hobbit and World of Warcraft. He also joined Beatvox and the Beatbox Collective, whose members included Reeps One and Bellatrix.

Hug's vocals appeared on the soundtrack to the 2012 film Miss Threadgold (Dir. Carol Allen).

== Teaching and coaching ==
Hug coached London-based choir Chantage to develop their beatboxing, which resulted in a performance at the Purcell Room. In 2014 Hug worked with the Yehudi Menuhin outreach programme, delivering a beatboxing workshop to young musicians, and also appeared at Enterprise Music Scotland's Music Education Matters conference. He presented Beatbox and Beyond: Using the Voice as an Instrument at the 2015 Pan European Voice Conference in Florence, Italy and The Future of Networking and Collaboration at the LEO Sings! Diversity of Singing Practices in Europe as part of the Leonardo da Vinci programme in Freiburg, Germany.

== Discography ==
Hug appeared on the following Swingle Singers' albums:

Year	Album	Notes
2002	Mood Swings	
2003	Retrospective – The 40th Anniversary Show	
2004	Unwrapped	
2007	Beauty and the Beatbox	Featuring Hug's arrangement of Walter Murphy's A Fifth of Beethoven
2009	Ferris Wheels	
2011	Yule Songs Vol. II	Hug appeared on two tracks: O Holy Night and O Come, O Come Emmanuel
2013	Mood Swings	
2013	Weather to Fly	Hug appeared on four tracks: The Diva Aria, Weather to Fly, Woman in Chains and Gemiler Giresune

Hug's arrangement of A Fifth of Beethoven, performed by The Swingle Singers and Shlomo, also appeared on the 2012 Signum Anniversary Series A Cappella Collection

== Posthumous dedications ==
After Hug's death, Luxembourg's Festival A CAPE'lla dedicated their 2020 festival to him. Hug's family established The Tobias Hug Scholarship as part of the Black Forest Voices festival, which also dedicated a new song to Hug, "The Call of Melody", in 2020.
