= Keep Your Eye on the Sparrow =

1975 song by Morgan Ames and Dave Grusin

Single by Merry Clayton

from the album Keep Your Eye on the Sparrow
- Released: July 1975 (U.S.)
- Label: Ode
- Songwriters: Morgan Ames, Dave Grusin

Merry Clayton singles chronology
"Oh No Not My Baby" (1975)	"Keep Your Eye on the Sparrow" (1975)	"Emotion" (1980)

"Baretta's Theme (Keep Your Eye on the Sparrow)"

Single by Rhythm Heritage

from the album Disco-Fied
- B-side: "My Cherie Amour"
- Released: April 1976 (U.S.)
- Genre: Disco
- Length: 3:15
- Label: ABC
- Songwriters: Morgan Ames, Dave Grusin
- Producers: Steve Barri, Michael Omartian

Rhythm Heritage singles chronology
"Theme from S.W.A.T." (1975)	"Baretta's Theme (Keep Your Eye on the Sparrow)" (1976)	"Theme from Rocky (Gonna Fly Now)" (1977)

"Keep Your Eye on the Sparrow", also known as "Baretta's Theme", is a song written by Morgan Ames and Dave Grusin, recorded by multiple artists during the summer of 1975. Merry Clayton's version was the first to chart, reaching #45 on the U.S. Billboard Hot 100.

A version by Rhythm Heritage became a Top 20 hit in 1976. The band recorded it as a semi-instrumental number, with subdued vocals by Oren and Luther Waters. It was selected as the theme to the TV show Baretta, starring Robert Blake. "Baretta's Theme" was released as a single in the spring of 1976, reaching #20 on the U.S. Billboard Hot 100 and #15 in Canada.

== Chart history ==
Merry Clayton

Chart (1975)	Peak position
Canada RPM Top Singles	71
U.S. Billboard Hot 100	45
U.S. Billboard R&B	42
U.S. Cash Box Top 100	58

Sammy Davis Jr.

Chart (1976)	Peak position
U.S. Billboard Bubbling Under the Hot 100	101

Rhythm Heritage ("Baretta's Theme")

Chart (1976)	Peak position
Canada RPM Adult Contemporary	22
Canada RPM Top Singles	15
U.S. Billboard Hot 100	20
U.S. Billboard Adult Contemporary	14
U.S. Cash Box Top 100	16

== Other versions ==
- The Latin band El Chicano covered the song on their 1975 LP Pyramid of Love and Friends.
- Sammy Davis Jr.'s version of "Keep Your Eye on the Sparrow" was released in 1976. It reached #101 on the Billboard Bubbling Under chart.
