= Junk Food Junkie =

Single by Larry Groce

from the album Junkfood Junkie
- B-side: "Muddy Boggy Banjo Man"
- Released: 1975
- Recorded: 1975
- Genre: Novelty
- Length: 3:03
- Label: Warner/Curb 8165
- Songwriter: Larry Groce
- Producer: C. Randolph Nauert

"Junk Food Junkie" is a 1975 novelty song by American singer-songwriter and radio host Larry Groce. It spent 15 weeks on the U.S. charts, reaching #9 on the Billboard Hot 100. It was Groce's only song to chart. "Junk Food Junkie" spent two weeks at #31 in Canada, and it was also a minor hit on the Adult Contemporary chart. The song is currently released on K-tel International.

== Background ==
The song tells the story of a man leading a double life: during the day he boasts of his natural diet lifestyle; however, at night, he indulges his secret addiction to junk food.

== Chart history ==
=== Weekly charts ===
Chart (1976)	Peak position
Canada RPM Adult Contemporary	48
Canada RPM Top Singles	31
U.S. Billboard Hot 100	9
U.S. Billboard Easy Listening	33
U.S. Cash Box Top 100	20

=== Year-end charts ===
Chart (1976)	Rank
US Billboard Hot 100	94

== Popular culture ==
- The song was performed by Mackenzie Phillips and The Jacksons, on the June 23, 1976, episode of The Jacksons TV variety show.

== See also ==
- List of 1970s one-hit wonders in the United States
