= A Fifth of Beethoven =

Single by Walter Murphy and the Big Apple Band

from the album A Fifth of Beethoven and Saturday Night Fever
- B-side: "California Strut"
- Released: 1976
- Studio: Sound Ideas (New York)
- Genre: Disco; funk; novelty
- Length: 3:02
- Label: Private Stock
- Songwriters: Ludwig van Beethoven; Walter Murphy
- Producer: Thomas J. Valentino

Walter Murphy and the Big Apple Band singles chronology
"Disco Bells" (1975)	"A Fifth of Beethoven" (1976)	"Flight '76" (1976)

Official audio
- "A Fifth of Beethoven" on YouTube

"A Fifth of Beethoven" is a disco instrumental recorded by Walter Murphy and the Big Apple Band, adapted from the first movement of Ludwig van Beethoven's Symphony No. 5. The record was produced by production music and sound effects recording producer Thomas J. Valentino. The "Fifth" in the song's title is a pun, referencing a liquid measure approximately equal to one-fifth of a gallon, a popular size for bottles containing liquor, as well as Beethoven's Fifth Symphony from which the song was adapted.

Released as a single by Private Stock Records in 1976, the song debuted at number 80 on the Billboard Hot 100 chart and climbed to number 1 within 19 weeks, remaining there for one week. In 1977, it was licensed to RSO Records for inclusion on the best-selling Saturday Night Fever soundtrack. The song is Murphy's only Top 40 hit.

== Background and recording ==
In college, Murphy's interests included rock music, particularly that which was adapted from classical music, such as "Joy" (1971) by Apollo 100 and "A Lover's Concerto" (1965) by The Toys. Later, in 1976, while writing a disco song for a commercial, a producer suggested the idea of "updating classical music", which "nobody [has] done lately". He then recorded a demo tape of five songs—three were ordinary pop songs, while the fourth was a disco rendition of Beethoven's Fifth Symphony titled "A Fifth of Beethoven"—mailing it to various record labels in New York City.

The response was underwhelming, but "Fifth" caught the interest of Private Stock Records owner Larry Uttal. Murphy signed on to Private Stock and recorded the album A Fifth of Beethoven, containing the title track and first single of the same name. The single was credited to "Walter Murphy & The Big Apple Band" upon encouragement from Private Stock, which believed it would be more successful if credited to a group rather than an individual. However, two days following the record's release, Private Stock discovered the existence of another Big Apple Band (which promptly changed its name to Chic). The record was later re-released and credited to "The Walter Murphy Band", then simply to "Walter Murphy".

The 1998 single "Enjoy Yourself" by A+ samples this song.

== Reception ==
"A Fifth of Beethoven" started at number 80 on the Billboard Hot 100; the single eventually reached number 1 within 19 weeks, where it stayed for one week. The single sold two million copies, while the album sold about 750,000 copies. The second single, a rendition of Nikolai Rimsky-Korsakov's "Flight of the Bumblebee", titled "Flight '76", reached number 44 on the Hot 100.

== In popular culture ==
The music was used in a recruitment campaign by the Irish Defence Forces in the early 1980s.

The song was used as the theme of the television miniseries Mrs. America.

The song was used in an episode of the second season of the TV series Pose.

An a cappella arrangement of A Fifth of Beethoven by Tobias Hug as recorded by The Swingles, was used for the pilot episode of Glee, which was first aired on Fox in May 2009.

The song was also used for a brief Saturday Night Fever parody that opened the 2006 Family Guy episode "Hell Comes to Quahog"; Murphy also composes the score for Family Guy.

The instrumental was used during a montage in the series finale of Loki, "Glorious Purpose".

== Charts and certifications ==
=== Weekly charts ===
Chart (1976)	Peak position
Australia (Kent Music Report)	15
Austria (Ö3 Austria Top 40)	15
Canada (RPM AC)	10
Canada (RPM)	1
Netherlands (Dutch Top 40)	21
Netherlands (Single Top 100)	18
New Zealand (Recorded Music NZ)	7
Norway (VG-lista)	6
South Africa (Springbok Radio)	14
Sweden (Sverigetopplistan)	14
Switzerland (Schweizer Hitparade)	8
UK Singles (Official Charts)	28
US Billboard Hot 100	1
US Billboard Hot Disco Singles	10
US Billboard Hot Soul Singles	10
US Billboard Adult Contemporary	13
US Cash Box Top 100	1
US Record World Singles	1
West Germany (GfK)	37

=== Year-end charts ===
Chart (1976)	Rank
Australia (Kent Music Report)	91
Canada Top Singles (RPM)	8
New Zealand (Recorded Music NZ)	25
US Billboard Hot 100	10
US Cash Box Top 100	6

=== All-time charts ===
Chart (1958–2018)	Position
US Billboard Hot 100	120

=== Certifications ===
Region	Certification	Certified units/sales
Canada (Music Canada)	Platinum	150,000^{^}
United States (RIAA)	Gold	1,000,000^{^}
^{^} Shipments figures based on certification alone.

== See also ==
- List of Billboard Hot 100 number ones of 1976
- List of Cash Box Top 100 number-one singles of 1976
- List of number-one singles of 1976 (Canada)
