= Moonlight Feels Right =

- Side A of the US single

Single by Starbuck

from the album Moonlight Feels Right
- B-side: "Lash LaRue"
- Released: December 31, 1975
- Recorded: 1975
- Studio: Studio One (recording studio), Doraville, GA.
- Genre: Soft rock; jazz pop
- Length: 3:38
- Label: Private Stock
- Songwriter: Bruce Blackman
- Producers: Bruce Blackman, Mike Clark

Starbuck singles chronology
"Moonlight Feels Right" (1975)	"I Got to Know" (1976)

"Moonlight Feels Right" is the debut single recorded by the American band Starbuck. Written and produced by Bruce Blackman, the song was released in December 1975 but did not chart until April 1976.

== Background ==
On the American Top 40 radio program of August 14, 1976, Casey Kasem reported the group's difficulties in promoting their single. Over the previous winter they had delivered the record to 400 radio stations, 95 percent of which had told them they would play it, but did not. One of those stations, WERC in Birmingham, Alabama, told them that it sounded like a spring song to them, so they would play it but would wait until spring to do so. Discouraged, the group re-entered the recording studio. However, WERC kept their promise and became the first station to play the song. "Moonlight Feels Right" subsequently became a hit.

Moonlight Feels Right debuted at number 90 on the U.S. charts the week of April 17, 1976, with a chart run of over five months. Blackman detailed the story of the song in his 2018 book, The Road to Moonlight Feels Right – The story behind one of the most popular songs of the '70s.

The song features a prominent marimba solo by co-founding band member Bo Wagner, whose mallet teacher was Emil Richards.

== Television performances ==
Starbuck performed "Moonlight Feels Right" on The Midnight Special television program on July 23, 1976 (season 4, episode 37). The show was hosted by The Spinners. They also performed it on American Bandstand with Dick Clark on August 28, 1976.

== Chart performance ==
"Moonlight Feels Right" was a major American hit, peaking at number three on the Billboard Hot 100 the weeks of July 31 and August 7, 1976, number two on the Cash Box chart, and number four on Record World. It is ranked as the 34th biggest US hit of the year. On the Canadian chart, the song reached number three in early August 1976. It is ranked as the 51st biggest Canadian hit of 1976.

=== Weekly charts ===
Chart (1976)	Peak position
Australia (Kent Music Report)	25
Canadian RPM Top Singles	3
Canada RPM Adult Contemporary	1
New Zealand (RIANZ)	21
US Billboard Hot 100	3
US Billboard Easy Listening	2
US Cash Box Top 100	2
US Record World	4

=== Year-end charts ===
Chart (1976)	Rank
Canada	51
US Billboard Hot 100	34
US Billboard Easy Listening	12
