= THP Orchestra =

The THP Orchestra was a 1970s Canadian disco group from Toronto created by British producer Willi Morrison and Canadian producer Ian Guenther. The band released its first album in 1977 and was nominated for a Juno Award for Most Promising New Group. After two releases in two years, the group shortened its name Three Hats Productions to THP and released a third album on Atlantic Records. It disbanded in 1980.

== Discography ==
Albums

- Early Riser (RCA, 1976)
- Two Hot for Love! (Butterfly, 1977) U.S. #65, U.S. R&B #57
- Tender Is the Night (Butterfly, 1978)
- Good to Me (Atlantic, 1979)

Singles

Note: "Theme from S.W.A.T." charted at No. 1 in Canada according to RPM.

Year	Title	Chart Positions	
Year	Title	US Dance	US R&B
1978	"Two Hot for Love"	3	46
1979	"Music Is All We Need/Weekend Two Step/Tender Is The Night"	14	-
1979	"Good to Me"	16	-
