= Starbuck (band) =

American music group

- Origin: Atlanta, Georgia, US
- Genres: Rock, pop rock, progressive rock
- Years active: 1974–1980, 2013–2014, 2016
- Labels: Private Stock Records; United Artists; AVI
- Past members: Bruce Blackman; David Snavely; Bo Wagner; Johnny Walker; Elgin Wells; Sloan Hayes; David Shaver; Jimmy Cobb; Tommy Strain; Ron Norris; Kenny Crysler; Darryl Kutz; Bob Gauthier; John Fristoe
- Website: moonlightfeelsright.com

Starbuck was a rock band formed in Atlanta, Georgia, in 1974 by keyboardist/vocalist/record producer Bruce Blackman and marimba player Bo Wagner. The band is best known for its No. 3 hit single Moonlight Feels Right in 1976.

== Background ==
Both Blackman and Wagner, along with guitarist Johnny Walker, had previous success with Mississippi-based "sunshine pop" group Eternity's Children, scoring a Billboard Hot 100 hit with "Mrs. Bluebird" in the summer of 1968. Wagner worked as a studio musician in Los Angeles in the early 1970s, appeared on The Lawrence Welk Show, and played drums for the extravagant pianist Liberace. His mallet teacher was Emil Richards.

Starbuck's debut single, "Moonlight Feels Right", reached the No. 3 position on the Billboard Hot 100 singles charts in 1976. It features a prominent marimba solo by Wagner. Although the band never re-created the success of their debut, several of their songs did chart in the Billboard Top 100, and their 1977 release "Everybody Be Dancin'" reached No. 38.

From 1976 to 1980, the band toured with popular groups of the era, including Electric Light Orchestra, KC and the Sunshine Band, Hall & Oates, England Dan & John Ford Coley and Boston. TV appearances included The Midnight Special, American Bandstand, The Merv Griffin Show, Dinah!, The Mike Douglas Show, and Solid Gold. The band was briefly known as Korona in the early 1980s, getting one Hot 100 hit in 1980, "Let Me Be," which reached No. 43 in April.

In July 2013, a number of former Starbuck members (founders Blackman and Wagner, guitarist Tommy Strain, keyboardists Sloan Hayes and David Shaver, bassist Jimmy Cobb, and drummer Kenny Crysler) performed at Chastain Park in Atlanta. The group also reunited once more for their final performance on August 20, 2016, with the same lineup as their previous reunion concert in 2013.

Bruce Blackman was inducted into the Mississippi Writer's Garden on April 5, 2014. He detailed the story of Starbuck in his 2018 book, The Road to Moonlight Feels Right – the story behind one of the most popular songs of the '70s. In 2022 he released twelve new songs on the album Starbuck 2022, with a single release called "Jones About You". Blackman continues to write and record songs; these are recorded solo in his Atlanta home, but released under the Starbuck moniker.

After Starbuck, Bo Wagner went on to set up a performing arts school and taught music and dance. He then shifted careers into health care for the entertainment industry, using the name "Dr Bo". Wagner died on June 20, 2017, in Santa Monica, California, aged 72.

== Discography ==
=== Albums ===
Year	Album	Canada (RPM)	US Top 200
1976	Moonlight Feels Right	64	78
1977	Rock'n Roll Rocket	—	182
1978	Searching for a Thrill	—	—
2022	Starbuck 2022	—	—

=== Singles ===
Year	Song	CA	CAN AC	US BB	US AC	US CB	AUS	NZ	Album
1976	"Moonlight Feels Right"	3	1	3	2	2	25	21	Moonlight Feels Right
1976	"I Got to Know"	36	9	43	11	40	—	—	Moonlight Feels Right
1976	"Lucky Man"	44	27	73	42	48	—	—	Moonlight Feels Right
1977	"Everybody Be Dancin'"	57	30	38	41	48	—	—	Rock & Roll Rocket
1978	"Searching for a Thrill"	46	—	58	—	45	—	—	Searching for a Thrill
1983	"The Full Cleveland"	—	—	—	—	—	—	—	non-album single
2023	"I Love Doing Nothing"	—	—	—	—	—	—	—	non-album single
2024	"Spring Break Shake"	—	—	—	—	—	—	—	non-album single
2024	"Jones About You"	—	—	—	—	—	—	—	non-album single
