= Tonight's the Night (Gonna Be Alright) =

Single by Rod Stewart

from the album A Night on the Town
- B-side: "The Ball Trap" (UK); "Fool for You" (US)
- Released: May 1976 (International); September 1976 (US)
- Recorded: December 1975
- Genre: Pop; soft rock
- Length: 3:56 (album version); 3:34 (edit)
- Label: Riva (UK); Warner Bros. (US)
- Songwriter: Rod Stewart
- Producer: Tom Dowd

Rod Stewart singles chronology
"This Old Heart of Mine" (1976)	"Tonight's the Night (Gonna Be Alright)" (1976)	"The Killing of Georgie (Part I and II)" (1976)

Music video
- "Tonight's The Night (Gonna Be Alright)" on YouTube

"Tonight's the Night (Gonna Be Alright)" is a song written by Rod Stewart, and recorded at Muscle Shoals Sound Studio in Sheffield, Alabama for his 1976 album A Night on the Town. The song, controversial at the time of release, proved to be a massive commercial success and became his second US chart topper on the Billboard Hot 100. It made its debut at number 81 on 2 October 1976 and rose quickly, climbing from number eight to the top of the chart on 13 November 1976, and remained on top for eight consecutive weeks until 8 January 1977. It was the longest stay of any song during 1976, the longest run at the top for a single in the US in over eight years (since the Beatles’ "Hey Jude" in November 1968), and the longest stay at number one for Rod Stewart in his entire recording career, and the final number one of that year. The song also peaked at No. 5 in the UK, No. 1 for six weeks in Canada, No. 3 in Australia and charted well in other parts of the world. It was the number 1 song on both Billboard's 1977 year-end chart and the year-end Canadian singles chart. It became the best-selling single of 1977 in the United States. As of 2018, it is the 19th-most popular song in the history of the chart.

== Background and lyrics ==
According to Dan Peek of America, Stewart's inspiration for "Tonight's the Night" was America's Top 30 hit "Today's the Day": Peek recalls that one evening when he and Stewart were playing together in Peek's home recording studio: "I played 'Today's the Day', the song I had been working on. Rod said that he liked it and that it gave him an idea for a song. Of course after his recording of 'Tonight's the Night' came out I laughed when I remembered what he'd said. I'm sure I probably smacked my forehead and said: 'Why didn't I think of that?'"

The song features a French spoken part from Britt Ekland who was Stewart's girlfriend at the time. While primarily recorded at Muscle Shoals, the final vocal was recorded at Caribou Ranch studios, where Stewart, Ekland and producer Tom Dowd spent several days. The high-altitude result was a vocal an octave higher than "sea-based" versions. The saxophone solo is by Jerry Jumonville.

The song was originally banned by the BBC and protested by Reverend Jesse Jackson, due to its suggestive lyric: "C'mon angel, my heart's on fire/Don't deny your man's desire/You'd be a fool to stop this tide/Spread your wings and let me come inside." Some radio stations play edits of the song, shortening the coda, as well as the whispers, because they were deemed to be too suggestive for airplay, where the songs could be banned from being played on the air.

Record World said, "Here Stewart's as relaxed and moving as he can be." In 2024 Ultimate Classic Rock critic Michael Gallucci rated it as the 23rd greatest soft rock song, saying that it "[merged] impassioned soul with not-so-subtle sexed-up soft rock."

== Chart performance ==
=== Weekly charts ===
Chart (1976–1977)	Peak position
Australia (Kent Music Report)	3
Canada RPM Top Singles	1
Canada RPM Adult Contemporary	44
Germany	26
Ireland	6
Netherlands (Dutch Top 40)	7
Netherlands (Single Top 100)	5
New Zealand	2
Sweden	7
UK	5
US Billboard Hot 100	1
US Billboard Easy Listening	42

=== Year-end charts ===
Chart (1976)	Rank
Australia (Kent Music Report)	11
Canada	1
Netherlands (Dutch Top 40)	92
New Zealand	19

Chart (1977)	Rank
US Billboard Hot 100	1

=== All-time charts ===
Chart (1958–2018)	Position
US Billboard Hot 100	19

== Certifications ==
Region	Certification	Certified units/sales
Canada (Music Canada)	Gold	75,000^{^}
New Zealand (RMNZ)	Gold	15,000^{‡}
United States (RIAA)	Gold	1,000,000^{^}
^{^} Shipments figures based on certification alone.^{‡} Sales+streaming figures based on certification alone.

== Cover versions ==
In 1993, Stewart recorded a live version of the song during his session for MTV Unplugged. This version was included on the album Unplugged...and Seated.

The song has been remade by such artists as: Linda Clifford, Nicky Moore, and sung by Anthony Kavanagh, Terry Steele, who reached number forty-four on the R&B singles chart, and Alison Crawford on Grease is the Word.

A version by Roy Head reached the top 30 in the USA (#28) and Canada (#17) Country charts in 1978.

Janet Jackson covered the song on her 1997 album The Velvet Rope, although she changed the lyrics. In Jackson's cover, the lyrics imply that she and her partner are about to share a threesome with another woman. Jackson begins the song by saying, "This is just between me and you...and you." Additionally, each chorus addresses a different person, as she sings, "'Cause I love you, boy" in one and "'Cause I love you, girl" in another. "She even makes a bid for gay icon status…" wrote Neil McCormick in The Daily Telegraph's review of The Velvet Rope, "climaxing (if that's the right word) with a bizarre lesbian reinterpretation of Rod Stewart's 'Tonight's the Night'."
