= Theme from S.W.A.T. =

Single by Rhythm Heritage

from the album Disco-Fied
- B-side: "I Wouldn't Treat a Dog (The Way You Treated Me)"
- Released: November 1975
- Recorded: 1975
- Genre: R&B; funk
- Length: 4:07
- Label: ABC
- Songwriter: Barry De Vorzon
- Producers: Michael Omartian, Steve Barri

Rhythm Heritage singles chronology
"Theme from S.W.A.T." (1975)	"Baretta's Theme (Keep Your Eye on the Sparrow)" (1975)

"Theme from S.W.A.T." is an instrumental song written by Barry De Vorzon and performed by American funk group Rhythm Heritage, released on their debut album Disco-Fied. It reached number one on the Billboard Hot 100 singles chart in the United States on the chart date of February 28, 1976.

The song was the opening theme music for the 1970s American television series S.W.A.T., though it is a different recording from the actual TV theme version, which was not performed by Rhythm Heritage, but by Barry De Vorzon's own orchestra with arrangement by Dominik Hauser. The theme song was also referenced by characters in the 2003 motion picture of the same name, who mouth the notes during a party to celebrate their successful completion of the training course. De Vorzon's original was eventually released on the LP Nadia's Theme on Arista records.

It remains one of a few TV themes to top the Billboard Hot 100, a list that includes "Welcome Back" by John Sebastian, "Miami Vice Theme" by Jan Hammer and "How Do You Talk to an Angel" by Jamie Walters & the Heights.

== Personnel ==
- Scott Edwards – bass (Note: AllMusic attributes the bass performance to James Jamerson, however several sources including Billboard (1988) credit the Rhythm Heritage bassist Scott Edwards.)
- Jeff Porcaro – drums
- Ray Parker Jr. – guitar
- Jay Graydon – guitar
- Horn section – Musicians unknown

== Charts ==
=== Weekly charts ===
Chart (1975–1976)	Peak position
Australia (Kent Music Report)	11
Canada RPM Top Singles	1
Canada RPM Adult Contemporary	19
US Billboard Hot 100	1
US Adult Contemporary (Billboard)	5
US Cash Box Top 100	1

=== Year-end charts ===
Chart (1976)	Rank
Canada	29
US Billboard Hot 100	29
US Hot R&B/Hip-Hop Songs (Billboard)	25
US Billboard Easy Listening	21
US Cash Box Top 100	31

== Covers and use in sampling ==
- In Canada, the THP Orchestra's disco version of the song reached number one on the RPM pop chart the same year as the US version.
- In 1987, rapper and actor LL Cool J sampled the song for his single "I'm Bad" from his album Bigger and Deffer. LL Cool J also later starred in the 2003 film version of S.W.A.T.
- In 1994, S.W.A.T. released a version titled "Theme From SWAT"— sung by Jerry A. of Poison Idea, with sampled LAPD radio broadcasts from the April 1992 riots— on their album Deep Inside: A Cop's Mind.
- In 2003, Rap group Hot Action Cop used the song as template for a song titled "Samuel Jackson" which was used as the closing theme to the film adaptation of S.W.A.T., starring Samuel L. Jackson.
- In 2011, a remix version of the song was performed by composer John Paesano, appeared in the opening credits of S.W.A.T.: Firefight.
- In 2017, a remake of the song was performed by Robert Duncan for the CBS television reboot series of the same name.
- In 1976 Ray Conniff and his Orchestra had mild success with their cover of "The Theme from SWAT" on Columbia Records.
- In 1990 the Italian DJ and Producer Piero Fidelfatti, sampled a part of the main theme and made a house version of "Theme From S.W.A.T." (Magic Service/Discomagic MS001)
- In 1991 the rap group 3rd Bass sampled the instrumental in a remixed version of their song "3rd Bass Theme a.k.a. Portrait of the Artist as a Hood" on Def Jam Recordings.

== See also ==
- List of Hot 100 number-one singles of 1976 (U.S.)
- List of RPM number-one singles of 1976
