= Rhythm Heritage =

1970s American disco-funk band

- Origin: Los Angeles, California, U.S.
- Genres: Funk; R&B
- Label: ABC
- Past members: Steve Barri; Michael Omartian; Scott Edwards; Ed Greene

Rhythm Heritage was a 1970s American funk/R&B band, best known for their 1976 US number one single "Theme from S.W.A.T.". It sold over one million copies and was awarded a gold disc by the Recording Industry Association of America (RIAA) in February 1976. They also recorded theme music for several other ABC television shows, including "Keep Your Eye on the Sparrow," also from 1976, from Baretta (sung by Sammy Davis Jr.).

Rhythm Heritage was formed in 1975 by producer Steve Barri and session keyboardist Michael Omartian, and included bassist Scott Edwards and drummer Ed Greene. Other musicians who played on some of their recordings included Ray Parker Jr., Jeff Porcaro, Victor Feldman, Jay Graydon, Dean Parks, Ben Benay, and Bob Walden.

== Discography ==
=== Albums ===
- 1976 - Disco-fied
- 1977 - Last Night on Earth - AUS number 97
- 1978 - Sky's the Limit
- 1979 - Disco Derby

=== Singles ===
- 1975 - "Theme from S.W.A.T." (US #1, Canada #1)
- 1976 - "Baretta's Theme (Keep Your Eye on the Sparrow)" (US #20, Canada #15)
- 1977 - "Theme from Rocky (Gonna Fly Now)" (US #94, Canada #92)

== See also ==
- List of artists who reached number one in the United States
