= Rick Dees =

American radio personality (born 1950)

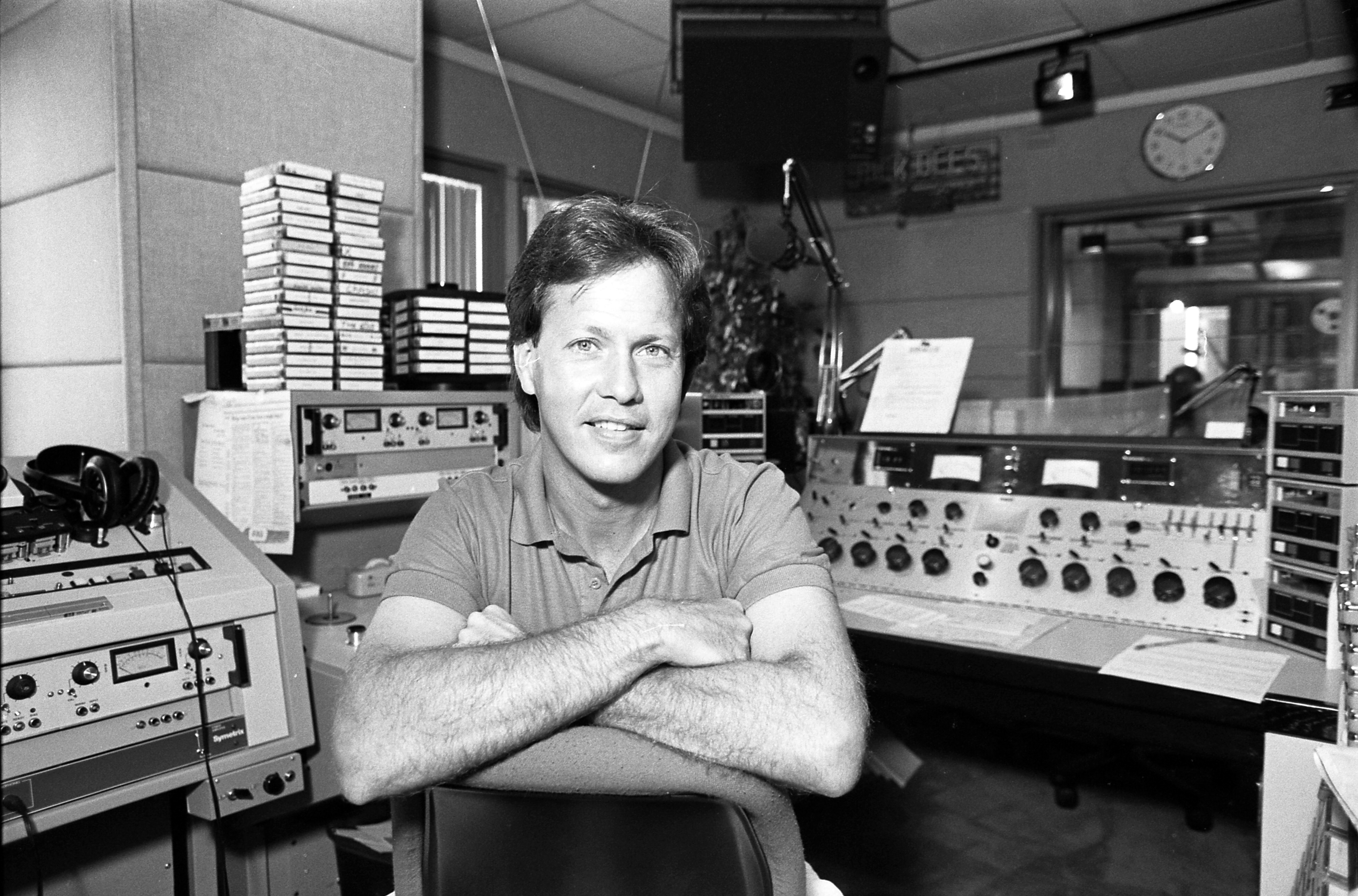
- Dees in 1986
- Born: Rigdon Osmond Dees III; March 14, 1950 (age 76); Jacksonville, Florida, U.S.
- Education: Grimsley High School; University of North Carolina at Chapel Hill
- Occupations: Radio personality; actor; comedian; musician
- Known for: Rick Dees Weekly Top 40; Disco Duck; La Bamba; You Are An Idiot
- Spouses: Carolyn R Craft (m. 1973–1977) Julie McWhirter (m. 1977)
- Children: Kevin Dees
- Website: rick.com

Rigdon Osmond Dees III (born March 14, 1950), best known as Rick Dees, is an American radio personality, best known for his internationally syndicated radio show The Rick Dees Weekly Top 40 Countdown and for the 1976 satirical novelty song "Disco Duck". He is a People's Choice Award recipient, a Grammy-nominated performing artist, and Broadcast Hall of Fame inductee. He performed the title song for the film Meatballs. He co-founded the E. W. Scripps television network Fine Living, now the Cooking Channel, and has hosted Rick Dees in the Morning at KIIS-FM and KHHT in Los Angeles. Today he continues his own syndicated daily radio show, Daily Dees and the syndicated Rick Dees Weekly Top 40 Countdown. He is also the voice announcer on the network Rewind TV.

== Early life ==
Dees was born Rigdon Osmond Dees III in Jacksonville, Florida, on March 14, 1950. He was raised in Greensboro, North Carolina. Dees graduated from Greensboro's Grimsley High School and the University of North Carolina at Chapel Hill with a bachelor's degree in motion pictures, TV, and radio.

== Career ==
=== Radio ===
Dees began his radio career at a Greensboro radio station called WGBG while still in high school. He worked for various radio stations throughout the southeastern United States, including WCAR (now known as WXYC) in Chapel Hill, North Carolina; WSGN in Birmingham, Alabama; and WKIX in Raleigh, North Carolina.

His introduction to the international entertainment arena began while working at WMPS AM 680 ("The Great 68") in Memphis, Tennessee, during the disco craze of the mid-to-late-1970s. He wrote and recorded "Disco Duck" in 1976; it sold more than six million copies. The song can be heard in Saturday Night Fever in a brief scene in which a group of older people were learning to "move their feet to the disco beat". While this platinum recording earned him a People's Choice Award for Favorite New Song, and the BMI Award for record sales in one year, Dees was expressly forbidden from playing the song on the air by station management (rival stations refused to play it for fear of promoting their competition). Dees was fired from WMPS when he mentioned that his song, "Disco Duck", was almost number 1, and his own radio station would not let him play it. The station manager said it was a conflict of interest. Dees did not perform the actual duck vocals on the song since he could not "talk like a duck". The duck vocals were recorded at Shoestring Productions in Memphis, Tennessee by Ken Pruitt, who moved away before the song became popular, and the vocals for the duck were done by Michael Chesney of Memphis for the concert tour. Chesney had done some comedic voices for Dees prior to Disco Duck. The tour went from Disney World to New York City, billed as Rick Dees and The Cast of Idiots. After a 45-day non-compete clause in his contract was satisfied, Dees was hired by RKO Radio to do the morning show at WHBQ AM 560 in Memphis.

The success of Dees at their Memphis radio station, combined with his TV appearances and hit music, motivated station owner RKO General to offer Rick the morning radio show in Los Angeles at KHJ (AM). Dees helped their ratings, but AM music radio was rapidly losing ground to FM. When KHJ switched to country music, Dees left KHJ, taking a morning position at KIIS-FM in July 1981. In a short time, he turned KIIS-FM into the #1 revenue-generating radio station in America, with an asset value approaching half a billion dollars.

He began his Weekly Top 40 countdown program, still currently in syndication, on the weekend of October 8–9, 1983 on 18 stations; the show was created after Dees's station KIIS dropped American Top 40 in a dispute over the playing of network commercials. The Weekly Top 40 has been heard each weekend in over 200 countries worldwide and the Armed Forces Radio Network. It is distributed domestically by Compass Media Networks and internationally by Dees Entertainment International (through Radio Express). In December 2008, the Weekly Top 40 became the first English-speaking radio show to air in China. The syndicated Countdown is available in several different editions including Hit Radio (for contemporary hit radio stations), Hot Adult (hot adult contemporary radio stations), 80s Edition and 90s Edition on terrestrial radio stations around the world.

After 23 years on radio station KIIS-FM, Dees left in February 2004 with no official explanation, and he was replaced by Ryan Seacrest. Dees returned to Los Angeles radio in August 2006 on KMVN, Movin 93.9, hosting the morning show along with Patti "Long Legs" Lopez and Mark Wong. On April 15, 2009, Movin 93.9 dismissed its radio personalities and changed the format to Spanish contemporary music after a leasing of the station to Mexico City business Grupo Radio Centro. Dees was one of the last voices on the station before the flip, redirecting listeners of his show to RICK.COM. On April 20, 2011, Dees returned for the second time, this time at KIIS's sister station KHHT, following the station's formatting shift to a Gold-based Rhythmic AC. His show at KHHT lasted for a year.

Dees continues distribution of his Rick Dees Weekly Top 40 Countdown globally to terrestrial radio stations and streaming in the U.S., making it the longest continuously running countdown featuring pop music in the world. He also continues to host the syndicated Daily Dees show, and can be heard in Hawaii on Kohala Radio KNKR 96.1 FM each morning live.

Dees has garnered many accolades, including the Marconi Award, induction into both the National Radio Hall of Fame, and the National Association of Broadcasters Hall Of Fame. In 1984, he received a Grammy Award nomination for his comedy album Hurt Me Baby – Make Me Write Bad Checks and has since received the Grammy Governor's Award. His other comedy albums – I'm Not Crazy, Rick Dees Greatest Hit (The White Album), and Put It Where The Moon Don't Shine have also enjoyed worldwide success. He is an inductee in the North Carolina Music Hall Of Fame, the Tennessee Radio Hall Of Fame, has received the Billboard Radio Personality Of The Year award for 10 consecutive years, received a People's Choice Award, and has been awarded a star on the Hollywood Walk of Fame.

Dees, through his holding company Rick Dees Entertainment, signed a deal with iHeartMedia in March 2025 enabling the company to access the archive of Weekly Top 40, including the addition of 2 permanent iHeartRadio webstreams of the show's archival material, one focused on the current programs and a "Classic" channel focused on his old broadcasts from the 1980s to 2000s. As a promotion for the deal, he briefly reunited with former co-host Ellen K during her morning show on KOST-FM on March 21 of that year.

=== Films and television ===
In television, Dees hosted his own late-night show on the ABC television network in the early 1990s, Into the Night Starring Rick Dees, which ran for one season and was canceled due to low ratings. He has guest-starred on Roseanne, Married... with Children, Diagnosis: Murder and many other hit shows. In addition, Dees hosted the syndicated series Solid Gold from Paramount Television, and his voice has been a part of numerous animated features, including The Flintstones, where he starred as Rock Dees, and Jetsons: The Movie, where he voiced Rocket Rick.

In feature films, Dees starred in La Bamba, portraying the iconic Ted Quillin, the Los Angeles disc jockey who helped launch Ritchie Valens's career.

His voice was heard as the radio DJ during the opening credits of the film Valley Girl, released in 1983.

In 2020, Dees provided the voice of Peter Griffin's impression of him in the Family Guy episode "La Famiglia Guy".

In August 2021, it was announced that Dees would be the voice announcer of the Nexstar Media Group network Rewind TV, showcasing shows from the 80s and 90s.

== Fisher v. Dees and other legal trouble ==
In 1984, Dees (and his record company) made a request of Marvin Fisher, the owner of the copyright in the music of the song "When Sunny Gets Blue", for permission to use the song in a parody of the performance by Johnny Mathis. Fisher refused to grant permission for the use. Dees decided to do a parody even without the permission of the copyright holder, using about 29 seconds of the song in a parody album titled Put It Where the Moon Don't Shine.

Fisher sued Dees for copyright infringement. The trial court found that the parody song, titled "When Sonny Sniffs Glue," was clearly intended to "poke fun" at the style of singing for which Johnny Mathis was well known, and thus was not infringing. The decision was upheld on appeal, in Fisher v. Dees 794 F.2d 432 (9th Cir. 1986).

In an unrelated 1991 case, Dees was successfully sued for $10 million in damages. The court found Dees and his business manager acted with "malice and oppression" in diverting profits from Dees's Top 40 countdown program and gave the judgment to a former business partner.

== Discography ==
- 1976 – The Original Disco Duck
- 1981 – Gift Rappin'
- 1983 – Hurt Me Baby – Make Me Write Bad Checks
- 1984 – Put It Where the Moon Don't Shine
- 1985 – I'm Not Crazy
- 1986 – Rick Dees Greatest Hit (The White Album) (Macola Records MRC-0971)
- 1996 – Spousal Arousal
- 2008 – Rick and Steve Theme Song

Year	Song	Billboard Hot 100	Australia	UK Singles Chart
1976	"Disco Duck (Part One)"	#1	#4	#6
1977	"Dis-Gorilla (Part One)"	#56	–	–
1978	"Bigfoot"	#110 (Bub. Under)	–	–
1984	"Get Nekked"	#104 (Bub. Under)	–	–
1984	"Eat My Shorts"	#75	–	–
