= Disco Duck =

Single by Rick Dees & His Cast of Idiots

from the album The Original Disco Duck
- A-side: "Disco Duck (Part One)"
- B-side: "Disco Duck (Part Two)"
- Released: September 4, 1976
- Recorded: 1973 in Memphis, Tennessee, U.S.
- Genre: Disco; novelty
- Length: 3:17
- Label: Fretone (initial release); RSO (wide distribution)
- Songwriter: Rick Dees
- Producer: Bobby Manuel

Rick Dees & His Cast of Idiots singles chronology
"Disco Duck" (1976)	"Dis-Gorilla" (1976)

Audio video
- "Disco Duck (Part One)" on YouTube

"Disco Duck" is a satirical disco novelty song performed by Rick Dees and His Cast of Idiots. At the time, Dees was a Memphis disc jockey. It became a number-one hit on the Billboard Hot 100 for one week in October 1976 (and ranked #97 out of the 100 most popular songs of the year according to Billboard magazine). It also made the top 20 on the Billboard Hot Soul Singles chart, peaking at number 15. "Disco Duck" was initially released in the south by Estelle Axton's Fretone label, but it was later released by RSO Records for national and international distribution. The song earned a 1977 People's Choice Award for Favorite New Song.

== Origin, composition and lyrics ==
Written by Dees, "Disco Duck" was inspired by a 1960s novelty dance song called "The Duck", recorded by Jackie Lee (Earl Lee Nelson) in 1965. According to Dees, it took one day to write the song, but three months to convince anyone to perform it.

Combining orchestral disco styles with a Donald Duck–esque voice (actually that of Yakky Doodle) as the main plot point, the story within "Disco Duck" centers on a man at a dance party who is overcome by the urge to get up and "get down" in a duck-like manner. When the music stops, he sits down, but when he decides to get up and dance again, he finds that everyone in the room is now doing his dance.

== Response and impact ==
"Disco Duck" became a nationwide hit in the United States by September 1976. On the Billboard Hot 100 singles chart, it peaked at number one on October 16, 1976, for one week, held the number-two spot for the following four weeks and remained in the Top 10 for a total of 10 weeks. The single sold over 4 million copies and won a People's Choice Award.

For all its success, "Disco Duck" got very little airplay in Memphis, including at WMPS, the station Dees worked for at the time; Dees was forbidden by station management to play the record on his own show, and rival stations refused to play it for fear of promoting the competition. When Dees merely mentioned the song on his show one morning, WMPS management fired him citing conflict of interest. After a brief mandatory hiatus, Dees was hired on at WMPS' primary competition, WHBQ, who gave him permission to play his song.

By the time "Disco Duck" had become a hit, Dees and his "Idiots" started making the rounds of the popular TV music shows to promote the record. On American Bandstand (and similar shows), Dees lip-synched to the recording, alone on stage with puppeteer Rickey Provow animating a duck puppet that he had made. This appearance was never seen in the Memphis area due to then-ABC affiliate WHBQ-TV pre-empting Bandstand for wrestling at the time and for the aforementioned Memphis radio avoidance reasons. But when Dees appeared on The Midnight Special and went on a live tour along the East Coast, he hired a band, backing singers and a commercial artist, Michael Chesney, to perform the duck vocals, and they did everything live.

"Disco Duck" made an appearance in the film Saturday Night Fever, in a dance club scene in which a group of Seniors were learning to dance disco-style. It was also featured in a deleted scene added to the PG-rated version. As it stands, Dees could have made an even more substantial amount of money from the song. According to Dees, his manager at the time made the extremely unwise decision to deny use of the song on the film's soundtrack album because of fears that it would compete with sales of Dees' own record. The Saturday Night Fever soundtrack has sold over 40 million copies worldwide, and is the second best-selling soundtrack of all time.

Irwin the Disco Duck, also called Irwin the Dynamic Duck, a fictional character who was featured on a series of children's records from Peter Pan Records, was inspired by this record.

== Charts ==
=== Weekly charts ===
Chart (1976–1977)	Peak position
Argentina	9
Australia (Kent Music Report)	4
Belgium (Ultratop 50 Flanders)	3
Belgium (Ultratop 50 Wallonia)	3
Canada Top Singles (RPM)	1
Finland (Suomen virallinen lista)	22
France (IFOP)	63
Israel (IBA)	4
Italy (FIMI)	4
Netherlands (Dutch Top 40)	4
Netherlands (Single Top 100)	4
New Zealand (Recorded Music NZ)	7
Norway (VG-lista)	3
Spain (PROMUSICAE)	25
Sweden (Sverigetopplistan)	3
UK Singles (OCC)	6
US Billboard Hot 100	1
US Cash Box Top 100	1
West Germany (GfK)	7

=== Year-end charts ===
Chart (1976)	Position
Australia (Kent Music Report)	46
Chart (1977)	Position
Australia (Kent Music Report)	61
Belgium (Ultratop Flanders)	57
Canada Top Singles (RPM)	3
Netherlands (Dutch Top 40)	61
Netherlands (Single Top 100)	75
UK Singles (OCC)	72
US Billboard Hot 100	97
US Cash Box Top 100	4

=== All-time charts ===
Chart (1958–2018)	Position
US Billboard Hot 100	175

== Certifications ==
Region	Certification	Certified units/sales
Canada (Music Canada)	Platinum	150,000^{^}
United States (RIAA)	Platinum	2,000,000^{^}
^{^} Shipments figures based on certification alone.
