= Gold (Ohio Players album) =

Compilation album by Ohio Players
- Released: October 1976
- Genre: Funk
- Length: 37:40
- Label: Mercury
- Producer: Ohio Players

Ohio Players chronology
Contradiction (1976)	Gold (1976)	Angel (1977)

Singles from Gold
- 1. "Feel the Beat (Everybody Disco)" Released: 1976

Gold is a compilation album by the American funk band Ohio Players. It was released in October 1976 by Mercury Records and features music from the albums Skin Tight, Fire, Honey and Contradiction, along with two new recordings—"Feel the Beat (Everybody Disco)" and "Only a Child Can Love". The compilation earned a gold certification from the RIAA and was the last Ohio Players album to do so.

In March 2008, Mercury released a different two-disc, 24-track compilation album, also called Gold.

== Critical reception ==
Professional ratings
Review scores
Source	Rating
AllMusic	5/5 stars
Christgau's Record Guide	A−
New Musical Express	7/10

Reviewing in Christgau's Record Guide: Rock Albums of the Seventies (1981), Robert Christgau wrote:

"OK, I don't approve of their album covers, although this one is relatively innocent—instead of casting the bald naked woman in molten metal they put wings on her and let her deliver a gold record, like an angel, or a carrier pigeon. But the visuals don't turn me off the aurals, which at their best fuse the body heat of funk with the mind games of the novelty single—that is, unite rhythmic and conceptual eccentricity. The not-on-any-album cuts are wasted—"Feel the Heat (Everybody Disco)" works just well enough to prove how mistaken they were to soften their attack for a subtitle. But four or five of these tracks are unmitigated miracles of commerce, and all of them are of a piece."

== Track listing ==
1. "Feel the Beat (Everybody Disco)" (3:15)
2. "Love Rollercoaster" (2:52)
3. "I Want to Be Free" (3:15)
4. "Fopp" (3:45)
5. "Far East Mississippi" (3:07)
6. "Skin Tight" (2:50)
7. "Fire" (4:36)
8. "Sweet Sticky Thing" (3:25)
9. "Jive Turkey (Part 1)" (3:05)
10. "Only a Child Can Love" (4:12)
11. "Who'd She Coo?" (3:18)

== Charts ==
Chart (1976)	Peak
U.S. Billboard Top LPs	31
U.S. Billboard Top Soul LPs	10

Singles

Year	Single	Peak chart positions	
Year	Single	US	US R&B
1977	"Feel The Beat (Everybody Disco)"	61	31
