= List of Hot Soul Singles number ones of 1975 =

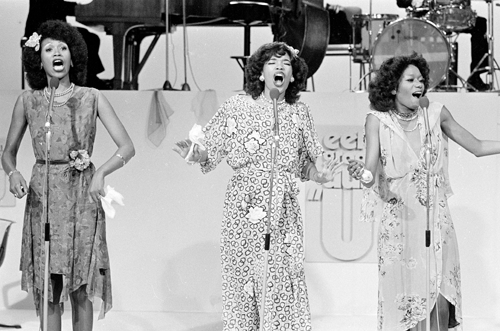
The Pointer Sisters gained their first number one with "How Long (Betcha' Got a Chick on the Side)".

Billboard published a weekly chart in 1975 ranking the top-performing singles in the United States in soul music and related African American-oriented genres; the chart has undergone various name changes over the decades to reflect the evolution of black music and since 2005 has been published as Hot R&B/Hip-Hop Songs. In 1975, it was published under the title Hot Soul Singles, and 43 different singles reached number one.

The rapid turnover of number ones during the year meant that 1975 had the highest number of chart-topping singles in a calendar year since Billboard launched a combined sales and airplay chart for black music in 1958. Only eight singles spent more than one week at number one, including one which spent two non-consecutive weeks in the peak position. The year's longest-running number one was "Fight the Power (Part 1)" by the Isley Brothers, which spent three consecutive weeks atop the chart in July and August. The Ohio Players spent the highest total number of weeks at number one of any act, with four weeks in the peak position. The group was the only act to achieve three number ones during the year; Al Green, KC & the Sunshine Band, the O'Jays, the Temptations and Barry White each took two singles to number one.

"Kung Fu Fighting" by Carl Douglas had already spent time at number one on Billboard's Hot 100 pop singles chart in late 1974 and reached the pinnacle of the soul listing in January 1975; it was among ten of 1975's soul chart-toppers to also reach the peak position on the Hot 100. Labelle, Earth, Wind & Fire, Van McCoy & the Soul City Symphony, Silver Convention and the Staple Singers each took a single to number one on both charts during 1975. The Ohio Players reached the summit of both charts during 1975 with "Fire", and their single "Love Rollercoaster", which was the final soul number one of 1975, would go on top the Hot 100 in early 1976. KC & the Sunshine Band also released two singles in 1975 which topped both charts: "Get Down Tonight" and "That's the Way (I Like It)". The former song was the first soul number one for the group, which would go on to be one of the leading acts in the disco genre before that style fell from favor at the end of the 1970s. Several acts who would go on to experience long and successful chart careers reached number one on the listing for the first time in 1975, including the Pointer Sisters and Earth, Wind & Fire. Conversely, acts including Shirley & Company, Major Harris and New Birth gained the only number ones of their respective careers during the year and would achieve only moderate further success in chart terms.

== Chart history ==
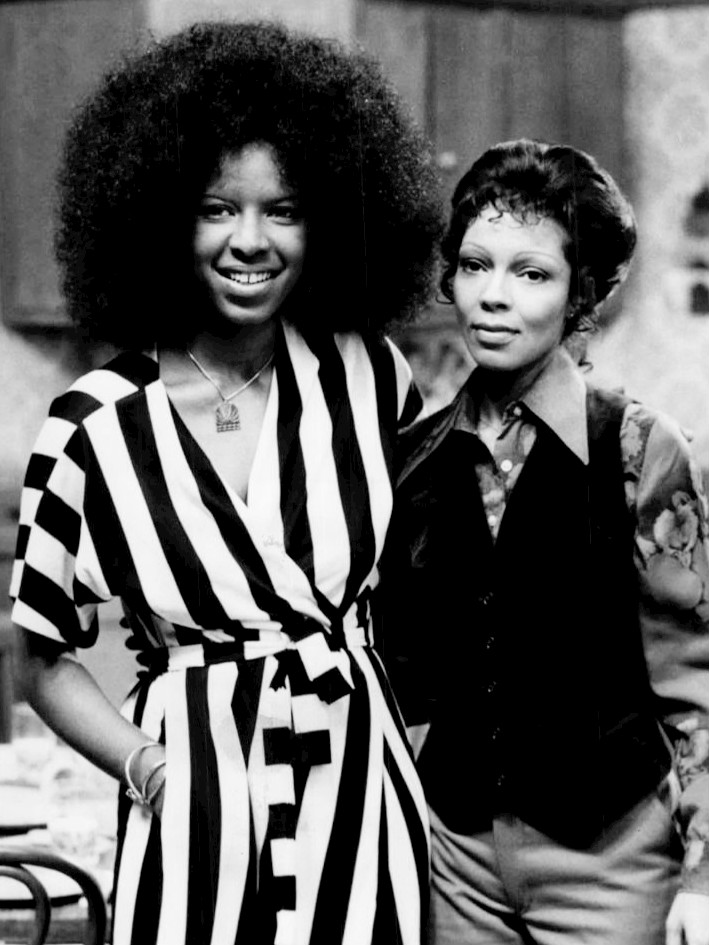
Natalie Cole (left, pictured with her sister Carole), had one of the few number ones to spend more than a single week in the top spot.

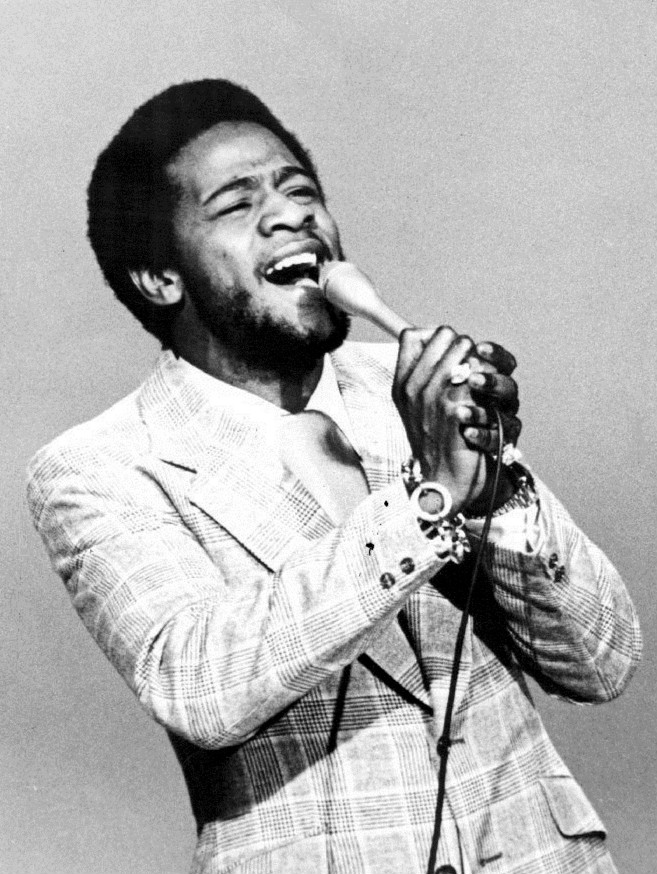
Al Green had two number ones in 1975.

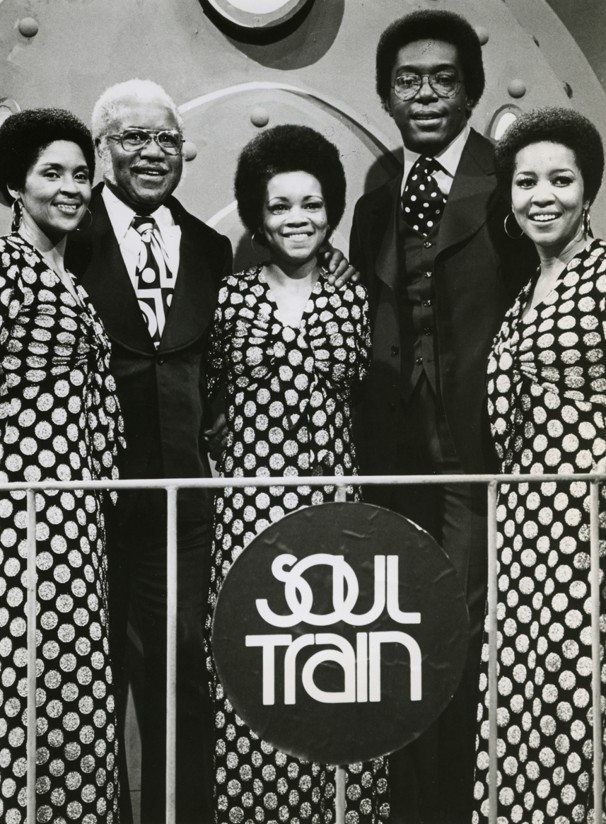
The Staple Singers, pictured with TV host Don Cornelius (second right)) topped the chart with "Let's Do It Again", which also topped the Hot 100.

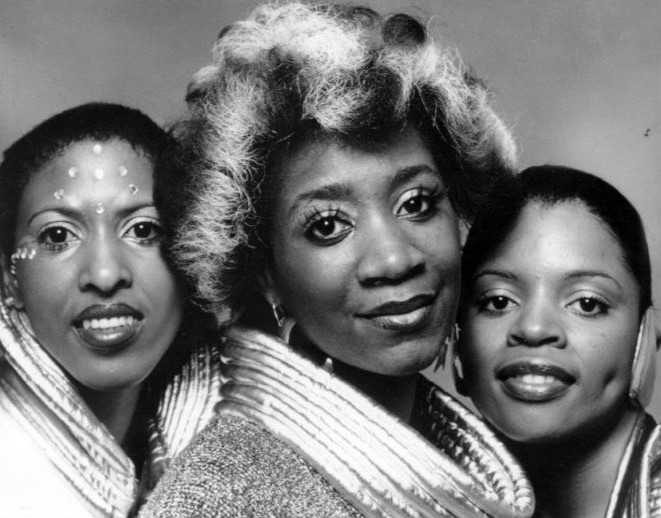
Labelle topped both the soul chart and the Hot 100 with "Lady Marmalade".

Key
†	Indicates number 1 on Billboard's year-end soul chart

Chart history
Issue date	Title	Artist(s)	Ref.
January 4	"Boogie On Reggae Woman"	Stevie Wonder	
January 11	"Kung Fu Fighting"	Carl Douglas	
January 18	"You're the First, the Last, My Everything"	Barry White	
January 25	"Fire"	The Ohio Players	
February 1	"Fire"	The Ohio Players	
February 8	"Happy People"	The Temptations	
February 15	"I Belong to You"	Love Unlimited	
February 22	"Lady Marmalade"	Labelle	
March 1	"Shame, Shame, Shame"	Shirley & Company	
March 8	"Express"	B. T. Express	
March 15	"Supernatural Thing (Part I)"	Ben E. King	
March 22	"Shining Star"	Earth, Wind & Fire	
March 29	"Shining Star"	Earth, Wind & Fire	
April 5	"Shoeshine Boy"	Eddie Kendricks	
April 12	"L-O-V-E (Love)"	Al Green	
April 19	"L-O-V-E (Love)"	Al Green	
April 26	"Shakey Ground"	The Temptations	
May 3	"What Am I Gonna Do With You"	Barry White	
May 10	"Get Down, Get Down (Get on the Floor)"	Joe Simon	
May 17	"Get Down, Get Down (Get on the Floor)"	Joe Simon	
May 24	"Baby That's Backatcha"	Smokey Robinson	
May 31	"Spirit of the Boogie"	Kool & the Gang	
June 7	"Love Won't Let Me Wait"	Major Harris	
June 14	"Rockin' Chair"	Gwen McCrae	
June 21	"Give the People What They Want"	The O'Jays	
June 28	"Look at Me (I'm in Love)"	The Moments	
July 5	"Slippery When Wet"	Commodores	
July 12	"The Hustle"	Van McCoy & the Soul City Symphony	
July 19	"Fight the Power (Part 1)" †	The Isley Brothers	
July 26	"Fight the Power (Part 1)" †	The Isley Brothers	
August 2	"Fight the Power (Part 1)" †	The Isley Brothers	
August 9	"Hope That We Can Be Together Soon"	Sharon Paige & Harold Melvin & the Blue Notes	
August 16	"Dream Merchant"	New Birth	
August 23	"Get Down Tonight"	KC & the Sunshine Band	
August 30	"Your Love"	Graham Central Station	
September 6	"How Long (Betcha' Got a Chick on the Side)"	The Pointer Sisters	
September 13	"How Long (Betcha' Got a Chick on the Side)"	The Pointer Sisters	
September 20	"It Only Takes a Minute"	Tavares	
September 27	"Do It Any Way You Wanna"	People's Choice	
October 4	"This Will Be"	Natalie Cole	
October 11	"This Will Be"	Natalie Cole	
October 18	"They Just Can't Stop It the (Games People Play)"	The Spinners	
October 25	"To Each His Own"	Faith Hope and Charity	
November 1	"Sweet Sticky Thing"	The Ohio Players	
November 8	"Low Rider"	War	
November 15	"Fly, Robin, Fly"	Silver Convention	
November 22	"Let's Do It Again"	The Staple Singers	
November 29	"That's the Way (I Like It)"	KC & the Sunshine Band	
December 6	"I Love Music (Part 1)"	The O'Jays	
December 13	"Let's Do It Again"	The Staple Singers	
December 20	"Full of Fire"	Al Green	
December 27	"Love Rollercoaster"	The Ohio Players	

== See also ==
- Billboard Year-End Hot Soul Singles of 1975
- List of Billboard Hot 100 number-one singles of 1975
