= Billboard Year-End Hot Soul Singles of 1975 =

American music chart

This is a list of Billboard magazine's Top Hot Soul Singles of 1975.

No.	Title	Artist(s)
1	"Fight the Power (Part 1)"	The Isley Brothers
2	"Fire"	Ohio Players
3	"Get Down Tonight"	KC and the Sunshine Band
4	"Love Won't Let Me Wait"	Major Harris
5	"I Belong to You"	Love Unlimited
6	"Look at Me (I'm in Love)"	The Moments
7	"The Hustle"	Van McCoy & the Soul City Symphony
8	"Rockin' Chair"	Gwen McCrae
9	"Pick Up the Pieces"	Average White Band
10	"Shining Star"	Earth, Wind & Fire
11	"Your Love"	Graham Central Station
12	"Get Down, Get Down (Get on the Floor)"	Joe Simon
13	"Baby That's Backatcha"	Smokey Robinson
14	"L-O-V-E (Love)"	Al Green
15	"This Will Be"	Natalie Cole
16	"Give the People What They Want"	The O'Jays
17	"Boogie On Reggae Woman"	Stevie Wonder
18	"I Feel a Song (In My Heart)"	Gladys Knight & the Pips
19	"You're the First, the Last, My Everything"	Barry White
20	"Sooner or Later"	The Impressions
21	"Slippery When Wet"	Commodores
22	"Do It Any Way You Wanna"	People's Choice
23	"It Only Takes a Minute"	Tavares
24	"They Just Can't Stop It' The (Games People Play)"	The Spinners
25	"How Long (Betcha' Got a Chick on the Side)"	The Pointer Sisters
26	"Kung Fu Fighting"	Carl Douglas
27	"Lady Marmalade"	Labelle
28	"Shoeshine Boy"	Eddie Kendricks
29	"Spirit of the Boogie"	Kool & the Gang
30	"Walking in Rhythm"	The Blackbyrds
31	"Take Me to the River"	Syl Johnson
32	"Shame, Shame, Shame"	Shirley & Company
33	"What Am I Gonna Do with You"	Barry White
34	"Hope That We Can Be Together Soon"	Sharon Paige and Harold Melvin & the Blue Notes
35	"Express"	B. T. Express
36	"When Will I See You Again"	The Three Degrees
37	"Dream Merchant"	New Birth
38	"Once You Get Started"	Rufus featuring Chaka Khan
39	"She's Gone"	Tavares
40	"Don't Take Your Love"	The Manhattans
41	"Supernatural Thing"	Ben E. King
42	"Shackin' Up"	Barbara Mason
43	"My Little Lady"	Bloodstone
44	"You Got the Love"	Rufus featuring Chaka Khan
45	"Make Me Feel Like a Woman"	Jackie Moore
46	"Shakey Ground"	The Temptations
47	"Why Can't We Be Friends?"	War
48	"Let Me Start Tonite"	Lamont Dozier
49	"Dreaming a Dream"	Crown Heights Affair
50	"Sexy"	MFSB

== See also ==
- 1975 in music
- Billboard Year-End Hot 100 singles of 1975
- List of Hot Soul Singles number ones of 1975
