= List of Billboard number-one R&B albums of 1975 =

These are the Billboard R&B albums that reached number one in 1975.

== Chart history ==
| Issue date | Album | Artist |
|---|---|---|
| January 4 | Fire | The Ohio Players |
| January 11 | Fire | The Ohio Players |
| January 18 | Fire | The Ohio Players |
| January 25 | Fire | The Ohio Players |
| February 1 | Fire | The Ohio Players |
| February 8 | Kung Fu Fighting and Other Great Love Songs | Carl Douglas |
| February 15 | New and Improved | The Spinners |
| February 22 | Do It ('Til You're Satisfied) | B.T. Express |
| March 1 | AWB | Average White Band |
| March 8 | AWB | Average White Band |
| March 15 | AWB | Average White Band |
| March 22 | Al Green Explores Your Mind | Al Green |
| March 29 | Perfect Angel | Minnie Riperton |
| April 5 | Perfect Angel | Minnie Riperton |
| April 12 | Perfect Angel | Minnie Riperton |
| April 19 | That's the Way of the World | Earth, Wind & Fire |
| April 26 | That's the Way of the World | Earth, Wind & Fire |
| May 3 | A Song for You | The Temptations |
| May 10 | To Be True | Harold Melvin and the Blue Notes |
| May 17 | Mister Magic | Grover Washington, Jr. |
| May 24 | Sun Goddess | Ramsey Lewis |
| May 31 | Just Another Way to Say I Love You | Barry White |
| June 7 | Survival | The O'Jays |
| June 14 | Survival | The O'Jays |
| June 21 | That's the Way of the World | Earth, Wind & Fire |
| June 28 | That's the Way of the World | Earth, Wind & Fire |
| July 5 | That's the Way of the World | Earth, Wind & Fire |
| July 12 | Disco Baby | Van McCoy & the Soul City Symphony |
| July 19 | The Heat Is On | The Isley Brothers |
| July 26 | The Heat Is On | The Isley Brothers |
| August 2 | The Heat Is On | The Isley Brothers |
| August 9 | Chocolate Chip | Isaac Hayes |
| August 16 | Chocolate Chip | Isaac Hayes |
| August 23 | Cut the Cake | Average White Band |
| August 30 | Why Can't We Be Friends? | War |
| September 6 | Non-Stop | B.T. Express |
| September 13 | Non-Stop | B.T. Express |
| September 20 | The Heat Is On | The Isley Brothers |
| September 27 | Honey | The Ohio Players |
| October 4 | Honey | The Ohio Players |
| October 11 | ...Is It Something I Said? | Richard Pryor |
| October 18 | ...Is It Something I Said? | Richard Pryor |
| October 25 | Honey | The Ohio Players |
| November 1 | Al Green Is Love | Al Green |
| November 8 | Al Green Is Love | Al Green |
| November 15 | KC and the Sunshine Band | KC and the Sunshine Band |
| November 22 | Inseparable | Natalie Cole |
| November 29 | Save Me | Silver Convention |
| December 6 | Let's Do It Again | The Staple Singers |
| December 13 | Let's Do It Again | The Staple Singers |
| December 20 | Feels So Good | Grover Washington, Jr. |
| December 27 | Family Reunion | The O'Jays |

== See also ==
- 1975 in music
- R&B number-one hits of 1975 (USA)
