= Ol' School =

Live album by Ohio Players
- Released: 1996
- Recorded: December 2, 1995
- Venue: Fox Theatre, Atlanta, Georgia
- Length: 51:23
- Label: Castle Records

Ohio Players chronology
Back (1988)	Ol' School (1996)

Professional ratings
Review scores
Source	Rating
AllMusic	2.5/5 stars

Ol' School is a live album by Ohio Players. It was recorded on December 2, 1995 at the Fox Theater, Atlanta, Georgia.

== Track listing ==
1. "Skin Tight" – 6:16
2. "Ol' School" – 3:53
3. "Pain" – 1:39
4. "Heaven Must Be Like This" – 4:29
5. "Sweet Sticky Thing" – 6:03
6. "Thank You" – 1:05
7. "I Wanna Be Free" – 5:59
8. "Love Rollercoaster" – 6:41
9. "Fire" – 11:11
10. "Megamix" – 4:07

== Personnel ==
- Eric Alexander – trombone
- Mike Barry – trumpet
- Leroy "Sugarfoot" Bonner – guitar, vocals, producer
- Darwin Dortch – bass guitar, vocals
- Laurence Etkin – trumpet
- Bob Funk – trombone
- Arno Hect – tenor saxophone
- Robert Lorenzo Jones – percussion
- Robert "Rumba" Jones – percussion
- Odeen Mays – keyboards, vocals
- Ron Nooks – keyboards, vocals
- Sam Skelton – saxophone
- James "Diamond" Williams – percussion, drums, vocals, producer
- Clarence Willis – rhythm guitar, vocals
- James Willis – percussion, drums, vocals
- Stutz Wimmer – saxophone

== Production ==
- Dennis Clark – Clothing/Wardrobe
- Rikki Garmon – Make-Up
- Marti Griffin – Photography
- Marty Griffin – Photography
- Jimmy Z. – Engineer
- Don Johnson – Executive Producer, Cover Design
- Jill McCarthy – Graphic Design
- Rodney Mills – Engineer, Mastering
- Joe Neil – Engineer
- Dany Nieves – Photography
- Rob Patterson – Executive Producer
- Allan Queen – Programming, Producer
- Angela Rogers – Artwork, Art Direction, Cover Art Concept, Cover Design
- Shawn Salter – Producer, Graphic Design
- Trammell Starks – Producer
- Claire Stigall – Text
- Philip White – Producer
- Kenneth Williams – Crew
