= Jass-Ay-Lay-Dee =

Studio album by Ohio Players
- Released: August 1978
- Recorded: The Chicago Recording Company (Chicago), Paragon Recording Studios (Chicago), The Record Plant (Los Angeles), Wally Heider Studios (Los Angeles)
- Genres: Soul, funk
- Length: 36:57
- Label: Mercury
- Producer: Ohio Players

Ohio Players chronology
Mr. Mean (1977)	Jass-Ay-Lay-Dee (1978)	Everybody Up (1979)

Singles from Jass-Ay-Lay-Dee
- 1. "Funk-O-Nots" Released: 1978; 2. "Time Slips Away" Released: 1978

Jass-Ay-Lay-Dee is the eleventh studio album by the Ohio Players. It was the 8th and last album they would record for Mercury. The title is a unique spelling of the term "jazzy lady." Unlike their last two efforts, the group remained with the nine-man roster that they had with Mr. Mean.

The group returned to the soul and funk that had been a big part of their sound, since the mellower, jazzier sounds of Mr. Mean (a soundtrack for a film directed by and starring Fred Williamson) failed to move fans and critics. Low sales of that album would also lead to lower-than-expected sales for Jass-Ay-Lay-Dee.

== Critical reception ==
Professional ratings
Review scores
Source	Rating
AllMusic	2/5 stars
Journal Herald	C

The Journal Herald deemed the album "the cleanest, most antiseptic Players LP yet."

== Track listing ==
All tracks composed by Billy Beck, James "Diamond" Williams, Marshall "Rock" Jones, Marvin "Merv" Pierce, Ralph "Pee Wee" Middlebrooks, Clarence Satchell and Leroy "Sugarfoot" Bonner.

1. "Funk-O-Nots" (4:48)
2. "Sleepwalkin'" (5:27)
3. "Jass-Ay-Lay-Dee" (8:18)
4. "Nott Enuff" (4:58)
5. "Time Slips Away/Shoot Yer Shot" (7:13)
6. "Dance (If Ya Wanta)" (6:13)

== Personnel ==
- Leroy "Sugarfoot" Bonner – guitars, percussion, vocals
- Clarence "Chet" Willis – rhythm guitar, vocals, lead vocals on "Time Slips Away"
- Billy Beck – grand piano, Fender Rhodes piano, Hammond B-3 organ, Hohner D-6 Clavinet, RMI Electric piano, ARP Odyssey Synthesizer, ARP string ensemble, percussion, vocals
- Marshall "Rock" Jones – bass
- James "Diamond" Williams – drums, congas, cowbell, percussion, vocals
- Robert "C.D." Jones – congas
- Ralph "Pee Wee" Middlebrooks – trumpets
- Clarence "Satch" Satchell – flute, alto saxophones, tenor saxophones, baritone saxophones, varitone and vocals
- Marvin "Merv" Pierce – trumpets, trombones and flugelhorn

== Charts ==
Chart (1978)	Peak
U.S. Billboard Top LPs	69
U.S. Billboard Top Soul LPs	15

Singles

Year	Single	Peak chart positions	
Year	Single	US	US R&B
1978	"Funk-O-Nots"	105	27
1978	"Time Slips Away"	—	53
