= Mr. Mean =

Mr. Mean may refer to:

- Mr. Mean (album), a 1977 album by The Ohio Players
- Mr. Mean (film), a 1977 film by Fred Williamson
- Mr. Mean (Mr. Men), a character and book from the Mr. Men book series
