= Angel (Ohio Players album) =

Studio album by Ohio Players
- Released: March 1977
- Recorded: Paragon (Chicago); CRC (Chicago)
- Genres: Funk, soul
- Length: 40:39
- Label: Mercury
- Producer: Ohio Players

Ohio Players chronology
Gold (1976)	Angel (1977)	Mr. Mean (1977)

Singles from Angel
- 1. "Body Vibes" Released: 1977; 2. "O-H-I-O" Released: 1977; 3. "Merry-Go-Round" Released: 1977

Angel is the ninth studio album by the Ohio Players, and the sixth album recorded for Mercury. The band grew from seven to eight members with the addition of Clarence "Chet" Willis on rhythm guitar.

Three singles were released in support of the album: "Body Vibes," "O-H-I-O," and "Merry Go Round." "O-H-I-O" would prove to be a concert favorite, with the band and crowd chanting in unison the letters.

== Critical reception ==
Professional ratings
Review scores
Source	Rating
AllMusic	3/5 stars

The New York Times deemed the album "a basic kind of rambling funk."

== Track listing ==
All tracks composed by Billy Beck, James "Diamond" Williams, Marshall "Rock" Jones, Marvin "Merv" Pierce, Ralph "Pee Wee" Middlebrooks, Clarence Satchell and Leroy "Sugarfoot" Bonner.

1. "Angel" (7:28)
2. "Merry-Go-Round" (4:15)
3. "Glad to Know You're Mine" (3:49)
4. "Don't Fight My Love" (4:13)
5. "Body Vibes" (7:10)
6. "Can You Still Love Me?" (4:50)
7. "O-H-I-O" (3:07)
8. "Faith" (5:30)

== Personnel ==
- Leroy "Sugarfoot" Bonner – guitars, vocals
- Clarence "Chet" Willis — rhythm guitar, vocals
- Billy Beck – grand piano, Fender Rhodes piano, Hohner Clavinet, RMI electric piano, ARP Odyssey synthesizer, ARP string ensemble, Hammond B-3 organ, percussion, vocals
- Marshall "Rock" Jones – bass
- James "Diamond" Williams – drums, congas, cowbells, temple blocks, percussion, vocals
- Ralph "Pee Wee" Middlebrooks – trumpets
- Clarence "Satch" Satchell – flute, alto saxophones, tenor saxophones, percussion, vocals
- Marvin "Merv" Pierce – trumpets

== Charts ==
Chart (1977)	Peak
U.S. Billboard Top LPs	41
U.S. Billboard Top Soul LPs	9

Singles

Year	Single	Peak chart positions	
Year	Single	US	US R&B
1977	"Body Vibes"	—	19
1977	"O-H-I-O"	45	9
1977	"Merry Go Round"	—	77
