= Sam Taylor (blues musician) =

American singer (1934–2009)

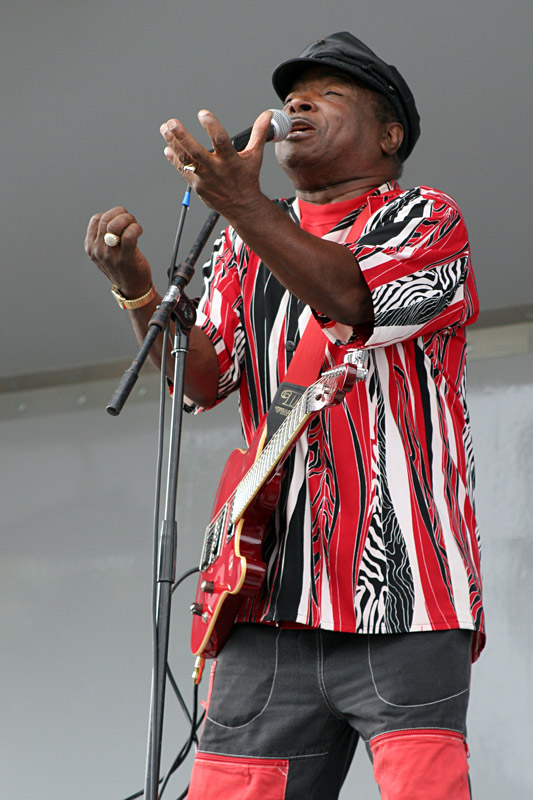
- Taylor performing at the Port Jefferson American Music Festival, 2006

Background information
- Also known as: Bluzman
- Born: Samuel Willis Taylor Jr. October 25, 1934; Mobile, Alabama, United States
- Died: January 5, 2009 (aged 74) Islandia, New York, United States
- Genres: Rock and roll, pop, jump blues, R&B
- Occupations: Musician, songwriter, bandleader, boxer
- Instruments: Vocals, guitar
- Years active: 1959–2009
- Labels: Capitol, Brother
- Formerly of: Joey Dee and the Starliters

Sam Taylor (October 25, 1934 – January 5, 2009) was an American jump blues musician and songwriter.

Taylor's more popular recordings included "Funny", "Drinking Straight Tequila", and "Voice of the Blues". He variously worked with Joey Dee and the Starliters, Otis Redding, B.T. Express, The Drifters, Big Joe Turner, T-Bone Walker, Sam & Dave, Tracy Nelson, Mother Earth, and The Isley Brothers. Taylor was inducted to the Long Island Music Hall of Fame.

== Biography ==
Born Samuel Willis Taylor Jr. in Crichton, a suburb of Mobile, Alabama, Taylor began singing gospel at the age of three. His Long Island connection began in 1957, during his service in the United States Air Force. He was stationed at the Westhampton Beach Air Force Base, which was near the Blue Bird Inn.

After leaving the service in 1959, Taylor lived in Riverhead. His first major professional gig was as Maxine Brown's bandleader at the Apollo Theater and his first number one R&B hit single was "Funny". Taylor himself, often using the name Sammy Taylor, recorded for various labels including Capitol, Enjoy, and Atlantic Records.

The songwriter of hundreds of songs, many of them hits such as "Peace Pipe", performed by the B.T. Express, Taylor's efforts were recorded by Freddie King, Chubby Checker, Son Seals, Jimmy Witherspoon, Brook Benton, Jay and the Americans, Joey Dee, Maxine Brown, and Joe Tex. Taylor also was the bandleader and/or guitarist for Big Joe Turner, The Isley Brothers, Tracy Nelson, Otis Redding, and Sam & Dave.

Taylor and his songwriting partner, Bennie Earl, mentored young Florida duo Sam & Dave, writing two of their early hits, "People in Love" and "Listening For My Name", when the duo recorded for Roulette Records, predating their later success with Stax/Volt. Taylor was also an original member and guitarist/songwriter for Joey Dee and the Starliters. With fellow Starliter Dave Brigatti, Taylor had a strong influence on The Rascals, which included Brigati's younger brother Eddie. He also wrote some of the first songs for The Vagrants, which included Leslie West, who would later go on to form Mountain. After recording and appearing in two films with the Starliters including Two Tickets to Paris, Taylor took his friend Jimi Hendrix with him to tell Joey Dee and Morris Levy to let the young upstart take his place in the group.

At the start of the 1970s, Taylor and Earl were hired as staff songwriters for The Beach Boys' record label, Brother Records, until Brian Wilson burned the studio, with Taylor and Earl's demos for the group going up in flames. At that time, Taylor released his first solo album, Tunnels Of My Mind, on the GRT label. He was later hired by Roadshow Records as an A&R/songwriter for the acts they were signing. He was told by the record producer Jeff Lane that, in exchange for helping them build up the company, he would be granted a solo deal for three albums. One of these acts was King David House Rockers who became B.T. Express. Taylor played rhythm guitar on all tracks of the group's first five albums, with the first three being million sellers, Do It ('Til You're Satisfied), Non-Stop, and Energy to Burn. He also played the organ on the group's million seller, "Do It Your Satisfied". Taylor's song "Peace Pipe" became one of the group's biggest hits. Taylor also produced and wrote songs for Norma Jenkins' debut album, Patience is a Virtue, which included the soul track, "Reachin Out in Darkness".

By the late 1970s, he moved to Santa Monica, California, where at Venice Beach he and his weekly night show with his band A Band Called Sam attracted fellow artists such as Rickie Lee Jones, Gregory Hines, and Tom Waits, but drug addiction and medical problems threatened to dull his musical edge. In 1986, Taylor was featured alongside actress Galyn Görg in the indie cult film Living The Blues. It received a FilmTrax Award for original music at the Ghent International Film Festival.

Taylor then moved to Tucson, Arizona, to get clean and became a prime figure in Arizona's heavy music scene, where he hosted his own television program, Down To Earth, and a popular radio show called "The Blues According To Sam" on KXCI. It was also in Arizona that Taylor began a modest acting career, appearing in movies and television with Louis Gossett Jr., Mario Van Peebles, and Barbara Eden. He also appeared in the music film, Tapeheads. Taylor also saw two of his compositions used in the film. He rebooted his career by releasing three albums that he recorded in Arizona: Signature, Voice Of The Blues, and Bluzman.

Taylor's music has been sampled by rap artists. His sole composition for B.T. Express, "Everything That's Good To Ya (Aint Always Good For Ya)", became a popular hip hop lift used by EPMD, Beanie Sigel, Mase, Jay-Z, Lil' Kim, and DMX's on his first number one platinum hit single, "Get at Me Dog". Though the original B.T. Express song was never released as a single, it became the most sampled song in B.T. Express' catalog. His rhythm guitar licks from B.T. Express songs were sampled for SWV's "Use Your Heart" and EPMD's "So Wat Cha Sayin".

Upon his son Bobby's death, Taylor returned to New York. He was a resident of Central Islip until his own demise. There Taylor released five albums: Blue Tears, Keep The Blues Alive, I Came From The Dirt, Bluzman Back Home, and Portrait: The Funky Side Of Sam, which featured the song "Freaks" (a duet with his grandson L*A*W). Taylor also hosted WUSB (FM)'s Blues With A Feeling radio show. Along with Joan Jett, Billy Joel, Vanilla Fudge, Kiss, Mountain, Shadow Morton, Run–D.M.C., and Twisted Sister, Taylor was inducted by L*A*W into the Long Island Music Hall of Fame in 2006, and the Arizona Blues Hall Of Fame in 1997. Just before his death, he released his autobiography, Caught in the Jaws of the Blues. In 2013, Sam was inducted into the Blues Hall of Fame, which his grandson accepted on his behalf.

Taylor died on January 5, 2009, at his home in Islandia, New York, of complications associated with heart disease. He was 74.

Taylor had seven known children; two of them, Bobby and Sandra Taylor, followed in his footsteps and became musicians. Sandra Taylor was inducted into the Long Island Music Hall of Fame.
