= Contradiction (album) =

Studio album by Ohio Players
- Released: March 1976
- Recorded: Paragon (Chicago); Criteria (Miami); CRC (Chicago)
- Genres: Soul, funk
- Length: 38:36
- Label: Mercury
- Producer: Ohio Players

Ohio Players chronology
Honey (1975)	Contradiction (1976)	Gold (1976)

Singles from Contradiction
- 1. "Who'd She Coo?" Released: February 1976; 2. "Far East Mississippi" Released: 1976

Professional ratings
Review scores
Source	Rating
AllMusic	4/5 stars
Christgau's Record Guide	B−

Contradiction is the eighth studio album by the Ohio Players and the fourth album recorded for Mercury.

== History ==
Contradiction was not as ballad-heavy as Honey but it did expand on the mixture of funk, soul and rock that the Ohio Players played with on that album. The title track also showed a leaning towards the work they did on Westbound Records. "Who'd She Coo?" was released as a single and went to No. 1 on the Billboard R&B chart.

The band recorded Contradiction at three different recording studios, each session utilizing Barry Mraz as their engineer. The album cover depicts a nude woman feeding a horse a shiny red apple. While the horse is identified by name and breed in the liner notes (an Anglo-Trakehner stallion named Wasyl), the model is uncredited.

It is the fifth and last Ohio Players album to be announced also as a quadraphonic (four-channel stereo) release in the 8-track tape format. However, it was never actually released as no known copies have surfaced even among collectors and there is no evidence the remix was ever performed. Contradiction was one of three Ohio Players albums released in 1976. Westbound released Rattlesnake, featuring songs not used during their time with the label. With four Mercury albums under their belt and hit singles on the charts, the group would approve a greatest hits compilation, Gold.

== Track listing ==
All tracks are written by Billy Beck, James Williams, Marshall Jones, Marvin Pierce, Ralph Middlebrooks, Clarence Satchell and Leroy Bonner.

Side one
No.	Title	Length
1.	"Contradiction"	4:37
2.	"Precious Love"	4:57
3.	"Little Lady Maria"	4:16
4.	"Far East Mississippi"	4:58
Total length:		18:48

Side two
No.	Title	Length
1.	"Who'd She Coo?"	4:32
2.	"My Life"	4:01
3.	"Tell the Truth"	3:37
4.	"My Ladies Run Me Crazy"	3:54
5.	"Bi-Centennial"	3:44
Total length:		19:48

== Personnel ==
- Leroy "Sugarfoot" Bonner – guitars, harmonica, percussion, vocals
- Billy Beck – grand piano, Fender Rhodes piano, Wurlitzer electric piano, Hohner Clavinet, RMI Electric Piano, ARP "Odyssey" Synthesizer, ARP String Ensemble, percussion, vocals
- Marshall "Rock" Jones – bass, percussion
- James "Diamond" Williams – drums, timbales, congas, cowbells, steel drums, temple blocks, percussion, vocals
- Ralph "Pee Wee" Middlebrooks – trumpets
- Clarence "Satch" Satchell – flute, alto saxophone, tenor saxophone, percussion, vocals
- Marvin "Merv" Pierce – trumpets, trombones, percussion

Production

- Ohio Players – producers
- Barry Mraz, Lee Hulko – engineers
- Rob Kingsland, Karl Richardson, Steve Klein, Hank Neuberger – assistant engineer
- Jim Ladwig – art director
- Joe Kotleba, Jim Schubert – design
- Paul Gremmler – cover photography
- David Alexander – Ohio Players photos

== Charts ==
Chart (1976)	Peak
U.S. Billboard Top LPs	12
U.S. Billboard Top Soul LPs	1

Singles

Year	Single	Peak chart positions	
Year	Single	US	US R&B
1976	"Who'd She Coo?"	18	1
1976	"Far East Mississippi"	—	26

== See also ==
- List of number-one R&B albums of 1976 (U.S.)
