= Do It ('Til You're Satisfied) (album) =

Studio album by B. T. Express
- Released: November 1974
- Recorded: 1974
- Genres: Funk; soul; disco
- Length: 41:35
- Label: Scepter
- Producers: Dock Productions; Jeff Lane; Trade Martin

B. T. Express chronology
Do It ('Til You're Satisfied) (1974)	Non-Stop (1975)

Singles from Do It ('Til You're Satisfied)
- 1. "That's What I Want for You Baby / Do You Like It" Released: 1974; 2. "Do It ('Til You're Satisfied)" Released: 1974; 3. "Express" Released: 1974; 4. "Once You Get It" Released: 1975

Professional ratings
Review scores
Source	Rating
AllMusic	4/5 stars
Christgau's Record Guide	C+
The Village Voice	B−

Do It ('Til You're Satisfied) is the debut studio album by American band B. T. Express from Brooklyn, New York. It was released in 1974 via Scepter Records.

== Background ==
Production was handled by Jeff Lane and Trade Martin. The album peaked at number five on the Billboard 200 and topped the Top R&B Albums chart. It was certified Gold by the Recording Industry Association of America on March 6, 1975 for selling over 500,000 copies in the United States.

It spawned four singles: "That's What I Want For You Baby" b/w "Do You Like It", "Do It ('Til You're Satisfied)", "Express" and "Once You Get It".

In a 2024 interview with DJ Finesse of Video Explosion Urban Music Interviews, Jamal Risbrook talks about how his jacket got included in the front cover picture on the album. Shot in Brooklyn at the Nostrand Avenue station of the Long Island railway. Risbrook took off the jacket every time the photographer would do a shoot. He hung it on the fence. The photographer never noticed that the jacket was hanging there.

== Track listing ==
No.	Title	Writer(s)	Producer(s)	Length
1.	"Express"	B. T. Express	Jeff Lane; Dock Productions	5:03
2.	"If It Don't Turn You On (You Oughta' Leave It Alone)"	William Lee Nichols; Allen Williams	Jeff Lane; Dock Productions	5:27
3.	"Once You Get It"	Trade Martin	Trade Martin	3:18
4.	"Everything Good To You (Ain't Always Good For You)"	Samuel Willis Taylor Jr.	Jeff Lane; Dock Productions	3:00
5.	"Mental Telepathy"	Martin; Doc Boston	Trade Martin	4:03
6.	"Do It ('Til You're Satisfied)"	Nichols	Jeff Lane; Dock Productions	5:52
7.	"Do You Like It"	Carlos Ward	Trade Martin	5:52
8.	"That's What I Want For You Baby"	Nichols; Williams	Jeff Lane; Dock Productions	6:48
9.	"This House Is Smokin'"	George Burton; Joe Constantino	Trade Martin	2:12

2022 reissue bonus tracks (Iconoclassic Records)
No.	Title	Length
10.	"Express" (single version)	3:30
11.	"Do It ('Til You're Satisfied)" (single version)	3:14

== Personnel ==
Credits are adapted from the album's original liner notes and historical retrospectives.

B. T. Express

- Barbara Joyce Lomas – lead vocals
- Louis Risbrook (later Jamal Rasool) – bass guitar, organ, vocals
- Bill Risbrook – tenor saxophone, flute
- Carlos Ward – alto saxophone, flute
- Richard Thompson – guitar, vocals
- Wesley Hall – lead guitar
- Dennis Rowe – congas, timbales
- Terrell Woods – drums

Production

- Jeff Lane – producer
- Trade Martin – arranger, producer
- Dock Productions – producer
- Tom Moulton – mixing

== Charts ==
=== Weekly charts ===
Chart (1974–1975)	Peak position
US Billboard 200	5
US Top R&B/Hip-Hop Albums (Billboard)	1

=== Singles ===
Year	Single	Peak chart positions		
Year	Single	US Pop	US R&B	US Dance
1974	"Do It ('Til You're Satisfied)"	2	1	—
1974	"Express"	4	1	1

== Certifications ==
Region	Certification	Certified units/sales
United States (RIAA)	Gold	500,000^{^}
^{^} Shipments figures based on certification alone.

== See also ==
- List of Billboard number-one R&B albums of 1975
