= Observations in Time =

Studio album by Ohio Players
- Released: 1969
- Genre: Funk, R&B
- Length: 37:07
- Label: Capitol
- Producer: Johnny Brantley

Ohio Players chronology
Observations in Time (1969)	Pain (1972)

Singles from Observations in Time
- 1. "Bad Bargain" Released: 1969; 2. "Find Someone to Love" Released: 1969

Professional ratings
Review scores
Source	Rating
Allmusic	3/5 stars

Observations in Time is the 1969 debut album recorded by the Ohio Players and the only one of theirs to be released on the Capitol label. The album was a regional hit in and around the group's home city of Dayton, Ohio. David Bowie included "Here Today and Gone Tomorrow" into his 1974 live sets for the Philadelphia dates of the Year of the Diamond Dogs tour that resulted in the David Live album.

== Track listing ==
All tracks composed by Clarence “Satch” Satchell, Gregory "Greg" Webster, Leroy "Sugarfoot" Bonner, Ralph "Pee Wee" Middlebrooks, Marshall “Rock” Jones and Theodore “Dutch” Robinson; except where indicated

1. "Here Today and Gone Tomorrow" – 3:32
2. "Mother-in-Law" (Allen Toussaint) – 3:06
3. "Stop Lying to Yourself" – 2:18
4. "Over the Rainbow" (E.Y. Harburg, Harold Arlen) – 4:20
5. "Find Someone to Love" – 2:16
6. "Cold, Cold World" – 3:49
7. "Summertime" (DuBose Heyward, George Gershwin) – 7:47
8. "Bad Bargain" – 2:36
9. "The Man I Am" – 2:31
10. "Lonely Street" – 2:29
11. "Street Party" – 2:23

== Personnel ==
- The Ohio Players – main performer
- Johnny Brantley – producer
- Bill Shannon – liner notes
