= Climax (Ohio Players album) =

Compilation album by Ohio Players
- Released: October 1974
- Genre: Soul; funk
- Length: 36:52
- Label: Westbound
- Producer: Ohio Players

Ohio Players chronology
Skin Tight (1974)	Climax (1974)	Fire (1974)

Professional ratings
Review scores
Source	Rating
AllMusic	3/5 stars

Climax is a compilation album by the Ohio Players. It was released in October 1974 and is the first of two albums compiled from tracks left over from previous sessions recorded for the Detroit-based Westbound label. The group was signed to Mercury by the time Climax hit stores, and the album features only five new songs, with the other three pulled from previous albums. Their Mercury debut, Skin Tight, was released several months earlier.

Along with six originals, the album includes cover versions of Creedence Clearwater Revival's "Proud Mary" and Marvin Gaye's "What's Going On".

== Track listing ==
1. "Sleep Talk" (Ohio Players) (3:15) [from Ecstacy]
2. "Ruffell Foot" (Louis Crane, Belda Baine) (4:07)
3. "Proud Mary" (John Fogerty) (5:21)
4. "Climax" (Crane, Baine) (6:50)
5. "What's Going On" (Marvin Gaye, Al Cleveland, Renaldo Benson) (6:00)
6. "Food Stamps Y'All" (Crane, Baine) (2:28) [from Ecstacy]
7. "Players Ballin'" (Ohio Players) (4:31) [from Pain]
8. "Pack It Up" (Crane, Baine) (4:20)

== Charts ==
Chart (1974)	Peak
U.S. Billboard Top LPs	102
U.S. Billboard Top Soul LPs	24
