= Ecstasy (Ohio Players album) =

Studio album by Ohio Players
- Released: September 1973
- Genre: Soul; funk
- Length: 34:39
- Label: Westbound
- Producer: Ohio Players

Ohio Players chronology
Pleasure (1972)	Ecstasy (1973)	Skin Tight (1974)

Singles from Ecstacy
- 1. "Ecstacy" Released: 1973; 2. "Sleep Talk" Released: 1973

Professional ratings
Review scores
Source	Rating
AllMusic	3/5 stars

Ecstasy (September 1973) is the fourth studio album by the Ohio Players and the third and last one of theirs to be released through the Westbound label. The album was produced by the band and arranged by Walter "Junie" Morrison. The cover photo was taken by Joel Brodsky.

== Track listing ==
All tracks are written by Ohio Players, except where noted.

Side one
No.	Title	Writer(s)	Length
1.	"Ecstasy"		2:27
2.	"You and Me"		3:12
3.	"Not So Sad and Lonely"	Louis Crane, Belda Baine	3:20
4.	"(I Wanna Know) Do You Feel It"		4:23
5.	"Black Cat"		4:25

Side two
No.	Title	Writer(s)	Length
1.	"Food Stamps Y'all"	Crane, Baine	3:12
2.	"Spinning"		3:04
3.	"Sleep Talk"		3:15
4.	"Silly Billy"		4:26
5.	"Short Change"		2:55

== Personnel ==
- Walter "Junie" Morrison
- Leroy "Sugarfoot" Bonner
- Marshall "Rock" Jones
- Ralph "Pee Wee" Middlebrooks
- Bruce Napier
- Marvin "Merv" Pierce
- Clarence "Satch" Satchell
- James "Diamond" Williams

Production

- Ohio Players – producers
- Walter "Junie" Morrison – arrangements
- David Krieger – art direction
- Ron Canagata, The Graffiteria – designer
- Joel Brodsky, Neil Terk – photography
- Mia Krinsky – album co-ordination
- Bob Scerbo – art production supervision

== Charts ==
Chart (1973)	Peak
U.S. Billboard Top LPs	70
U.S. Billboard Top Soul LPs	19

Singles

Year	Single	Peak chart positions	
Year	Single	US	US R&B
1973	"Ecstasy"	31	12
1973	"Sleep Talk"	—	—
