= Back (Ohio Players album) =

Studio album by Ohio Players
- Released: 1988
- Studios: Sonic Art, Royal Recorders, Westlake Audio
- Genre: Funk
- Label: Track Record Company
- Producers: Ohio Players, Rick Brown, Glen Rupp, John A. Bokowski, Jr., Chip Wilson

Ohio Players chronology
Graduation (1984)	Back (1988)	The Best of the Westbound Years (1991)

Singles from Back
- 1. "Sweat" Released: 1988; 2. "From Now On (Let's Play)" Released: 1988

Back is the final studio album by the American band Ohio Players, released in 1988. The first single was "Sweat". It was Ohio Players' only album for Track Record Company.

The band supported the album by headlining a SOS Racisme show during the New Music Seminar and with a North American tour. "Sweat" and "From Now On (Let's Play)" were minor chart successes.

== Production ==
The album was produced primarily by Ohio Players; the band was made up of five members for the reunion. Some of the tracks incorporated hip hop-influenced sounds. Herbie Hancock contributed to the album after Leroy "Sugarfoot" Bonner had guested on Perfect Machine. "I'm Madd!" is about the dangers of drunk driving.

== Critical reception ==
Professional ratings
Review scores
Source	Rating
AllMusic	2/5 stars
Los Angeles Times	2/4 stars

The Los Angeles Times wrote that "the OPs attempt to reconcile their greazy, yowl 'n' growl attack with the stacks of microchips that go into creating le funk moderne." Spin determined that the band "sound as good as ever, sweet and nasty funk played just right." The Christian Science Monitor called the album "a continuation and expansion of the jazzy powerhouse funk style that popularized the Ohio Players in the mid-1970s." The New York Daily News praised the "live, groove-oriented sound." The Washington Post deemed the sound "hypnotic rhythms geared to maximum danceability, fueled by the dual guitars of Chet Willis and Leroy 'Sugarfoot' Bonner."

AllMusic concluded that, "while the Players deserve credit for trying something different and attempting to be relevant to the hip-hop/urban contemporary scene of the late 1980s, Back simply wasn't strong enough."

== Track listing ==
No.	Title	Length
1.	"Get 2 the Good Part"
2.	"Sweat"
3.	"From Now On (Let's Play)"
4.	"Show Off"
5.	"Just to Show My Love"
6.	"I'm Madd!"
7.	"Vibe Alive"
8.	"Rock the House"
9.	"Just a Minute"
10.	"Reputation"
11.	"Try"
