= Junie 5 =

Studio album by Walter "Junie" Morrison
- Released: 1981
- Recorded: 1981
- Genre: Funk
- Length: 33:59
- Label: Columbia
- Producer: Walter "Junie" Morrison for J.S. Theracon

Walter "Junie" Morrison chronology
Bread Alone (1980)	Junie 5 (1981)	Evacuate Your Seats (1984)

Junie 5 is a 1981 solo album recorded by singer/multi-instrumentalist Walter "Junie" Morrison. It was the second and last album that he would record for Columbia Records. As with the previous album Bread Alone, all of the instruments used on the album would be played by Morrison himself. The album also features involvement from the Ohio Players.

Junie 5 was reissued by Sony Records in Japan on 5/21/94, but has since been deleted. In 2011 it was reissued in the U.S. by Funky Town Grooves as a "two-fer" with his previous chronological release Bread Alone.

== Track listing ==
All songs written by Teresa Allman; except where noted.

1. "Rappin About Rappin (Uh-Uh-Uh)" (5:16) (released as a single - Columbia 43 02044)
2. "I Love You Madly" (3:48)
3. "Cry Me a River" (3:40) (released as a single - Columbia 11-60520)
4. "Victim of Love" (4:45)
5. "5" (3:31)
6. "Last One to Know" (3:30)
7. "Jarr the Ground" (Teresa Allman, James "Diamond" Williams, Leroy "Sugarfoot" Bonner, Billy Beck, Clarence "Chet" Willis) (4:39)
8. "Taste of Love" (4:44)

== Personnel ==
- Junie Morrison - all music and lead vocals
- Teresa "Wilamina" Allman, Valerie Allman, Gwen Allman - backing vocals
- Wes "The Wizard" Boatman - synthesizer programming
- Morrison Code - horns
- Steve Hoskins, Junie Morrison - horn arrangements

Technical

- Gary Platt - engineer
- David Kennedy - photography
