= Mr. Mean (album) =

Soundtrack album by Ohio Players
- Released: December 1977
- Recorded: The Record Plant (Los Angeles), Paragon Recording Studios (Chicago), The Sound Factory (Los Angeles)
- Genres: Soul, funk
- Label: Mercury
- Producer: Ohio Players

Ohio Players chronology
Angel (1977)	Mr. Mean (1977)	Jass-Ay-Lay-Dee (1978)

Singles from Mr. Mean
- 1. "Good Luck Charm (Part 1)" Released: 1977; 2. "Magic Trick" Released: 1978

Professional ratings
Review scores
Source	Rating
AllMusic	1.5/5 stars

Mr. Mean is the tenth studio album by the Ohio Players and the 7th album recorded for Mercury. It is the soundtrack to the eponymous 1977 film. The band's roster grew, this time from eight to nine members with the entrance of Robert "C.D." Jones on congas.

== Background ==
With the Ohio Players' popularity higher than ever, the group was asked by actor Fred Williamson to create music for Mr. Mean, a movie he was writing and directing. Some sessions for the album were recorded, like previous albums, at Paragon Recording Studio in Chicago but this project brought them into Los Angeles for the first time to record music.

The songs were a departure from the mid-tempo funk and soul they were becoming known for, especially compared to the album they released months before, Angel. The group placed a greater emphasis in incorporating more ballads and jazz of the quiet storm variety. Mr. Mean was the first time the entire band were seen on the cover posing with their model.

== Track listing ==
All tracks composed by Billy Beck, James "Diamond" Williams, Marshall "Rock" Jones, Marvin "Merv" Pierce, Ralph "Pee Wee" Middlebrooks, Clarence Satchell and Leroy "Sugarfoot" Bonner.

1. "Mr. Mean" (5:16)
2. "Fight Me, Chase Me" (5:10)
3. "The Controller's Mind" (1:36)
4. "The Big Score" (7:34)
5. "Magic Trick" (6:56)
6. "Good Luck Charm" (9:36)
7. "Speak Easy" (3:52)

== Later samples ==
- "Good Luck Charm"
  - "Last Words" by Nas from the 1999 album Nastradamus

== Personnel ==
- Leroy "Sugarfoot" Bonner – guitars, percussion, vocals
- Clarence "Chet" Willis – rhythm guitar, vocals
- Billy Beck – Grand piano, Fender Rhodes piano, Hohner D-6 Clavinet, RMI Electric piano, ARP Odyssey Synthesizer, ARP string ensemble, Hammond B-3 organ, percussion, vocals
- Marshall "Rock" Jones – bass
- James "Diamond" Williams – drums, vibes, cowbell, percussion, vocals
- Robert "Kuumba" Jones – congas
- Ralph "Pee Wee" Middlebrooks – trumpets, trombones
- Clarence "Satch" Satchell – flute, alto saxophones, tenor saxophones, percussion, vocals
- Marvin "Merv" Pierce – trumpets, trombones, flugelhorn

== Charts ==
Chart (1977)	Peak
U.S. Billboard Top LPs	68
U.S. Billboard Top Soul LPs	11

Singles

Year	Single	Peak chart positions	
Year	Single	US	US R&B
1977	"Good Luck Charm (Part 1)"	101	51
1978	"Magic Trick"	—	93
