= Walter "Junie" Morrison =

Background information
- Birth name: Walter Morrison
- Also known as: J.S. Theracon
- Born: June 28, 1954; Dayton, Ohio, U.S.
- Died: January 21, 2017 (aged 62); London, England
- Genres: Funk
- Occupation(s): Keyboardist, vocalist, producer
- Instrument(s): Keyboards, vocals, guitar, bass guitar, drums, marimba, trumpet
- Website: Junie Morrison Online at the Wayback Machine (archived September 30, 2011)

Walter "Junie" Morrison (June 28, 1954 – January 21, 2017) was an American songwriter, record producer, singer and multi-instrumentalist. He was a member of the Ohio Players in the early 1970s, and later became a member and musical director of Parliament-Funkadelic. Morrison is a member of the Rock and Roll Hall of Fame, inducted in 1997 with fifteen other members of Parliament-Funkadelic. George Clinton once described Morrison as "the most phenomenal musician on the planet."

== Biography ==
Born in Dayton, Ohio, Morrison sang and played piano as a child, soon learning a range of other instruments and becoming a school choir director and orchestra conductor. In 1970, he joined the funk band the Ohio Players, becoming a producer, writer, keyboardist and vocalist involved in some of their major hits and the albums Pain, Pleasure, and Ecstasy. He was largely responsible for writing and arranging the band's 1973 hit single, "Funky Worm".

He left the band in 1974 to release three solo albums on Westbound Records, on which he played all the instruments, credited as Junie – When We Do, Freeze, and Suzie Supergroupie.

In 1977 Morrison joined George Clinton's P-Funk (Parliament-Funkadelic) as musical director. He brought a unique sound to P-Funk and played a key role during the time of their greatest popularity from 1978 through 1980. In particular, he made prominent contributions to the platinum-selling Funkadelic album One Nation Under a Groove, the single "(Not Just) Knee Deep" (a #1 hit on the U.S. R&B charts in 1979), the gold-selling Parliament albums Motor Booty Affair, and Gloryhallastoopid. Morrison also played on and produced some P-Funk material under the pseudonym J.S. Theracon.

After his time with Parliament-Funkadelic, Morrison recorded three solo albums in the eighties including 1980's Bread Alone, 1981's Junie 5, and 1984's Evacuate Your Seats.

Morrison relocated to London, England in the late 1980s and founded the Akashic record label with his wife Kate Garner. He wrote material recorded by Sounds of Blackness, Soul II Soul, and God's Property. Morrison produced other artists, including James Ingram, throughout the 1990s and continued to contribute to P-Funk albums including T.A.P.O.A.F.O.M. in 1996 and (posthumously) in 2018's Medicaid Fraud Dogg. He released a solo album, When the City, on his own label Juniefunk in 2004. In 2014–2016 he self-released several singles, some under the aliases BoyInSea, Micronagual, The Algorithm, Jettzonn, and Tekadelic.

Morrison died on January 21, 2017, at the age of 62, in London. His death was reported the following month, but the details remained private.

== Discography ==
=== Solo albums ===
- 1975: When We Do - Credited to Junie
- 1975: Freeze - Credited to Junie
- 1976: Suzie Supergroupie - Credited to Junie
- 1980: Bread Alone
- 1981: Junie 5
- 1984: Evacuate Your Seats
- 2004: When The City
- 2010: Copying Atlantis - Credited to BoyInSea
- 2014: Copying Atlantis (Reissue with Bonus Track) - Credited to BoyInSea
