= List of Billboard 200 number-one albums of 1975 =

These are the Billboard magazine number-one albums of 1975, per the Billboard 200.

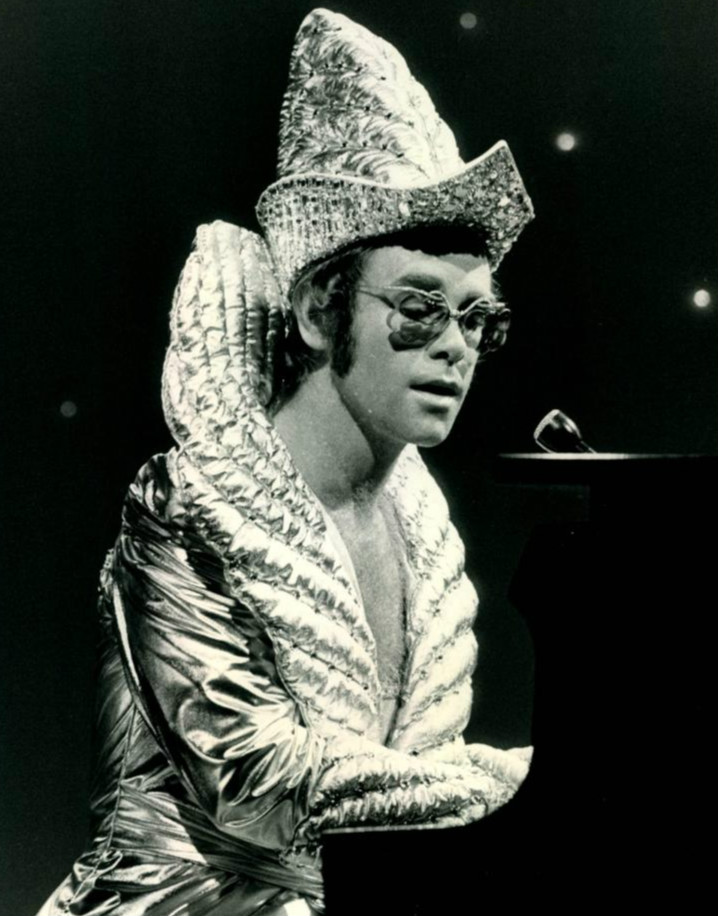
Elton John had three number one albums in 1975, Greatest Hits (the best-selling album of the year), Captain Fantastic and the Brown Dirt Cowboy, and Rock of the Westies, which spent a cumulative 15 weeks at number one during the year.

== Chart history ==
Key
†	Indicates best performing album of 1975

Issue date	Album	Artist(s)	Label	Ref.
January 4	Elton John's Greatest Hits †	Elton John	MCA	
January 11	Elton John's Greatest Hits †	Elton John	MCA	
January 18	Elton John's Greatest Hits †	Elton John	MCA	
January 25	Elton John's Greatest Hits †	Elton John	MCA	
February 1	Elton John's Greatest Hits †	Elton John	MCA	
February 8	Fire	Ohio Players	Mercury	
February 15	Heart Like a Wheel	Linda Ronstadt	Capitol	
February 22	AWB	Average White Band	Atlantic	
March 1	Blood on the Tracks	Bob Dylan	Columbia	
March 8	Blood on the Tracks	Bob Dylan	Columbia	
March 15	Have You Never Been Mellow	Olivia Newton-John	MCA	
March 22	Physical Graffiti	Led Zeppelin	Swan Song	
March 29	Physical Graffiti	Led Zeppelin	Swan Song	
April 5	Physical Graffiti	Led Zeppelin	Swan Song	
April 12	Physical Graffiti	Led Zeppelin	Swan Song	
April 19	Physical Graffiti	Led Zeppelin	Swan Song	
April 26	Physical Graffiti	Led Zeppelin	Swan Song	
May 3	Chicago VIII	Chicago	Columbia	
May 10	Chicago VIII	Chicago	Columbia	
May 17	That's the Way of the World	Earth, Wind & Fire	Columbia	
May 24	That's the Way of the World	Earth, Wind & Fire	Columbia	
May 31	That's the Way of the World	Earth, Wind & Fire	Columbia	
June 7	Captain Fantastic and the Brown Dirt Cowboy	Elton John	MCA	
June 14	Captain Fantastic and the Brown Dirt Cowboy	Elton John	MCA	
June 21	Captain Fantastic and the Brown Dirt Cowboy	Elton John	MCA	
June 28	Captain Fantastic and the Brown Dirt Cowboy	Elton John	MCA	
July 5	Captain Fantastic and the Brown Dirt Cowboy	Elton John	MCA	
July 12	Captain Fantastic and the Brown Dirt Cowboy	Elton John	MCA	
July 19	Venus and Mars	Wings	Capitol	
July 26	One of These Nights	Eagles	Asylum	
August 2	One of These Nights	Eagles	Asylum	
August 9	One of These Nights	Eagles	Asylum	
August 16	One of These Nights	Eagles	Asylum	
August 23	One of These Nights	Eagles	Asylum	
August 30	Captain Fantastic and the Brown Dirt Cowboy	Elton John	MCA	
September 6	Red Octopus	Jefferson Starship	Grunt	
September 13	The Heat Is On	The Isley Brothers	T-Neck	
September 20	Between the Lines	Janis Ian	Columbia	
September 27	Red Octopus	Jefferson Starship	Grunt	
October 4	Wish You Were Here	Pink Floyd	Columbia	
October 11	Wish You Were Here	Pink Floyd	Columbia	
October 18	Windsong	John Denver	RCA	
October 25	Windsong	John Denver	RCA	
November 1	Red Octopus	Jefferson Starship	Grunt	
November 8	Rock of the Westies	Elton John	MCA	
November 15	Rock of the Westies	Elton John	MCA	
November 22	Rock of the Westies	Elton John	MCA	
November 29	Red Octopus	Jefferson Starship	Grunt	
December 6	Still Crazy After All These Years	Paul Simon	Columbia	
December 13	Chicago IX: Chicago's Greatest Hits	Chicago	Columbia	
December 20	Chicago IX: Chicago's Greatest Hits	Chicago	Columbia	
December 27	Chicago IX: Chicago's Greatest Hits	Chicago	Columbia	

== See also ==
- 1975 in music
- List of number-one albums (United States)
