= Olde tyme =

The term "olde tyme" is an archaic spelling of the phrase "old time" but commonly used in newer business names, products, or styles.

Olde Tyme can refer to:

- Old-time music
- Old Time, a reference to a time period decades ago, or circa the Victorian era
- Dorset Old Tyme Bulldogge, a 1980s dog breed of bulldogs in the Victorian style

== See also ==
- Old school (disambiguation)
