= Fire (Ohio Players album) =

Studio album by Ohio Players
- Released: November 1974
- Recorded: Paragon (Chicago, Illinois)
- Genres: Funk, soul, rock
- Length: 36:27
- Label: Mercury
- Producer: Ohio Players

Ohio Players chronology
Climax (1974)	Fire (1974)	Honey (1975)

Singles from Fire
- 1. "Fire" Released: November 1974; 2. "I Want to Be Free" Released: 1975

Professional ratings
Review scores
Source	Rating
AllMusic	4.5/5 stars
Christgau's Record Guide	B
Džuboks	mixed

Fire is the sixth studio album by the Ohio Players and the second released through the Mercury label.

== History ==
Fire is the third of five Ohio Players albums that were also available in quadraphonic (4-channel stereo), released as an 8-track tape in the U.S. and on vinyl in Japan. DTS Entertainment released the quad mix as a DTS Audio CD in 2001.

The album's lead single "Fire" served as the theme song to the 2005 US television series Hell's Kitchen. Fire topped both the Billboard 200 pop albums chart and the Billboard R&B Albums chart (where it held for five weeks) in early 1975.

== Track listing ==
All tracks are written by James Williams, Clarence Satchell, Leroy Bonner, Marshall Jones, Ralph Middlebrooks, Marvin Pierce and William Beck.

Side one
No.	Title	Length
1.	"Fire"	4:36
2.	"Together"	3:08
3.	"Runnin' from the Devil"	4:48
4.	"I Want to Be Free"	6:56

Side two
No.	Title	Length
1.	"Smoke"	5:59
2.	"It's All Over"	4:15
3.	"What the Hell"	5:38
4.	"Together/Feelings" (listed as "Together (Reprise)" on back cover)	1:11

== Personnel ==
- Leroy "Sugarfoot" Bonner – guitar, percussion, lead & background vocals
- Billy Beck – piano, organ, Fender Rhodes piano, Clavinet, ARP, percussion, lead & background vocals
- Marshall "Rock" Jones – bass
- James "Diamond" Williams – drums, chimes, percussion, lead & background vocals
- Ralph "Pee Wee" Middlebrooks – trumpet, trombone & background vocals
- Clarence "Satch" Satchell – baritone sax, tenor sax, soprano sax, flute, percussion, lead & background vocals
- Marvin "Merv" Pierce – trumpet, flugelhorn, valve trombone & background vocals

Production

- Ohio Players – producers
- Barry Mraz, Lee Hulko – engineers
- Jim Ladwig – art director
- Len Willis – designer
- Stan Malinowski – photography

== Charts ==
Chart (1974–75)	Peak
Canada Top Albums/CDs (RPM)	17
U.S. Billboard Top LPs	1
U.S. Billboard Top Soul LPs	1

Singles

Year	Single	Peak chart positions	
Year	Single	US	US R&B
1974	"Fire"	1	1
1975	"I Want to Be Free"	44	6

== See also ==
- List of number-one albums of 1975 (U.S.)
- List of number-one R&B albums of 1975 (U.S.)
