= Honey (Ohio Players album) =

Studio album by Ohio Players
- Released: August 16, 1975
- Recorded: February–June, 1975
- Studios: Paragon (Chicago, Illinois)
- Genres: Soul; funk; R&B
- Length: 31:45
- Label: Mercury
- Producer: Ohio Players

Ohio Players chronology
Fire (1974)	Honey (1975)	Contradiction (1976)

Singles from Honey
- 1. "Sweet Sticky Thing" Released: August 9, 1975; 2. "Love Rollercoaster" Released: November 9, 1975; 3. "Fopp" Released: February 1976

Professional ratings
Review scores
Source	Rating
AllMusic	4.5/5 stars
Christgau's Record Guide	B+

Honey is the seventh studio album by American band the Ohio Players. Released on August 16, 1975, by Mercury Records. It is generally regarded as a classic, the band's best album, and the last great full-length release of their dominant era in the mid-1970s.

The cover image gained mild notoriety from urban legends involving one of the singles, "Love Rollercoaster", one to the effect that the honey injured model Ester Cordet's skin, ruining her career as a model, and another claiming that she was stabbed to death in the recording booth, with her scream captured on the song. These stories are false.

The album was recorded and mixed at Paragon Recording Studios in Chicago, with Barry Mraz as the recording engineer. Marty Link, Steve Kusiciel, Rob Kingsland, and Paul Johnson are credited as tape operators. Gilbert Kong mastered the final mix at Masterdisk in New York City.

The album peaked at No. 2 on the Billboard 200 during the week of September 27, 1975, kept out of the top spot by Jefferson Starship's Red Octopus. In addition, it was the third album from the band to top the Soul/Black Albums chart, where it spent three weeks.

== Release ==
In addition to the standard two channel stereo version, the album was also released in a four channel quadraphonic version in 1975. This version appeared on 8-track tape in the US and was the fourth of five Ohio Players albums available in this format. The quad version was re-issued on DTS Audio CD in 2001.

== Track listing ==
All tracks are written by James Williams, Clarence Satchell, Leroy Bonner, Marshall Jones, Ralph Middlebrooks, Marvin Pierce and William Beck.

Side one
No.	Title	Length
1.	"Honey"	5:15
2.	"Fopp"	3:45
3.	"Let's Love"	5:15
4.	"Ain't Givin' Up No Ground"	1:45
Total length:		16:00

Side two
No.	Title	Length
1.	"Sweet Sticky Thing"	6:13
2.	"Love Rollercoaster"	4:52
3.	"Alone"	4:40
Total length:		15:45

== Personnel ==
- Leroy "Sugarfoot" Bonner – guitars, lead & background vocals
- Billy Beck – piano, Hammond organ, Fender Rhodes electric piano, RMI electric piano, clavinet, ARP Odyssey, ARP string ensemble, percussion, lead & background vocals
- Marshall "Rock" Jones – bass
- James "Diamond" Williams – drums, timbales, congas, percussion, lead & background vocals
- Ralph "Pee Wee" Middlebrooks – trumpets
- Clarence "Satch" Satchell – tenor saxophone, baritone saxophone, flute
- Marvin "Merv" Pierce – trumpets, flugelhorn

Production

- Ohio Players – producers
- Barry Mraz, Gilbert Kong & Tom Hanson; engineers
- Marty Linke, Steve Kusiciel, Rob Kingsland, Paul Johnson – tape operators
- Richard Fegley – photography
- Jim Ladwig – art direction
- Joe Kotleba – design

== Cover versions ==
- "Fopp" by Soundgarden, from the 1988 EP Fopp
- "Love Rollercoaster" by Red Hot Chili Peppers, from the 1996 soundtrack to Beavis and Butt-Head Do America
- "Let's Love" by Vanessa Williams, on her 2005 covers album Everlasting Love

== Charts ==
=== Weekly charts ===
Chart (1975)	Peak position
Canada Top Albums/CDs (RPM)	33
US Billboard 200	2
US Top R&B/Hip-Hop Albums (Billboard)	1

=== Year-end charts ===
Chart (1975)	Position
US Top R&B/Hip-Hop Albums (Billboard)	32
Chart (1976)	Position
US Billboard 200	89
US Top R&B/Hip-Hop Albums (Billboard)	19

=== Singles ===
Year	Single	Peak chart positions	
Year	Single	US	US R&B
1975	"Sweet Sticky Thing"	33	1
1975	"Love Rollercoaster"	1	1
1976	"Fopp"	30	9

== See also ==
- List of number-one R&B albums of 1975 (U.S.)
