= Pain (Ohio Players album) =

Studio album by Ohio Players
- Released: February 1972
- Genre: Soul; funk
- Length: 30:10
- Label: Westbound
- Producer: Ohio Players, Herb James, Billy Pittman

Ohio Players chronology
Observations in Time (1969)	Pain (1972)	Pleasure (1972)

Singles from Pain
- 1. "Pain (Part 1)" Released: 1971

Professional ratings
Review scores
Source	Rating
AllMusic	4/5 stars

Pain is the second studio album by Ohio Players and their debut for the Westbound label.

== History ==
After releasing an album through Capitol Records in 1968, the Ohio Players had split up. Some of the members decided to take a chance once more and it led them to Armen Boladian, whose Westbound label in Detroit was the then-home of George Clinton and his band Funkadelic. The group recorded "Pain" and it was released as a single. Positive feedback lead to Boladian signing them for a full contract, making the band record enough material for their Westbound debut.

The group still has some of the vocal and musical qualities found on their Capitol material but their first work in the 1970s showed them incorporating a bit of jazz and a harder yet polished soulful sound. A number of things were established with this album. The romantic and sexy aspects of their music started with Pain, with songs devoted to their love of women. It would become one of their trademarks throughout their career. The group would also become known for their suggestive photos on the album covers. The group would also present a character in the form of a grandmother who was simply known as Granny, voiced by Walter "Junie" Morrison. Granny and her stories would remain with the group until Morrison left the group in 1974, the year the Ohio Players signed with Mercury. According to drummer Greg Webster, Dale Allen joined the group after being recommended by Bootsy Collins but was fired from the band after a heated argument with Clarence Satchell in the studio during the third day of recording the album.

When the album was released, the original mono mix of "Pain" was used. In 2018, the very first stereo mix of "Pain" emerged. It was featured on a 1/4" master tape from the Nashville recording sessions in May 1971, before the move to Westbound. The Ohio Players were still signed to Top Hit Records at that point. The Nashville tape contains 6 songs, including 2 songs that ended up on the Pain LP: "(If You Were) My Woman" and the very first stereo mix of "Pain". All songs on the Nashville tape were mixed by Bud Billings at Music City Recorders in Nashville. The mixes are different from the later releases on Westbound, in that the stereo field is wider and the sound is drier with less reverb. The Westbound album was engineered by Arlen Smith who also engineered Pleasure and Funkadelic's America Eats Its Young.

== Track listing ==
All tracks are written by Ohio Players (Gregory Webster, Andrew Noland, Walter Morrison, Marshall Jones, Leroy Bonner and Ralph Middlebrooks). The names of band members Bruce Napier and Marvin Pierce were mistakenly omitted from the writing credits on the original LP. Andrew Noland is a pseudonym for band leader Clarence Satchell.

Side one
No.	Title	Length
1.	"Pain"	6:12
2.	"Never Had a Dream"	4:35
3.	"Players Balling (Players Doin' Their Own Thing)"	4:22

Side two
No.	Title	Length
4.	"I Wanna Hear from You"	2:52
5.	"The Reds"	5:08
6.	"Singing in the Morning"	7:01

== Personnel ==
Production

- Ohio Players, Herb James and Billy Pittman – producers
- Bob Scerbo – production supervision
- Ohio Players – arrangement
- Joel Brodsky – photography

== Charts ==
Chart (1972)	Peak
U.S. Billboard Top LPs	177
U.S. Billboard Top Soul LPs	21

Singles

Year	Single	Peak chart positions	
Year	Single	US	US R&B
1971	"Pain (Part 1)"	64	35
