= Who'd She Coo? =

Single by The Ohio Players

from the album Contradiction
- B-side: "Bi-Centennial"
- Released: June 18, 1976
- Genre: R&B, funk
- Length: 3:18 (single version); 4:31 (album version)
- Label: Mercury
- Songwriters: William "Billy" Beck, Leroy "Sugarfoot" Bonner, Marshall "Rock" Jones, Ralph "Pee Wee" Middlebrooks, Marvin Pierce, Clarence "Satch" Satchell, James "Diamond" Williams

The Ohio Players singles chronology
"Fopp" (1976)	"Who'd She Coo?" (1976)	"Far East Mississippi" (1976)

"Who'd She Coo?" is a hit song for The Ohio Players in 1976. Released from their hit album Contradiction, it spent one week at #1 on the Hot Soul Singles chart and peaked at #18 on the Billboard Hot 100 singles chart in September, 1976. "Who'd She Coo" was the group's last chart-topping single as well as their last entry in the Top 40. The songs title was a take-off on the words "Hoochie Koo".

== Chart positions ==
Charts	Peak position
U.S. Billboard Hot 100	18
U.S. Billboard Hot Soul Singles	1
