= Old-fashioned =

Old-fashioned, an idiom meaning something not modern, or may refer to:

- Old fashioned (cocktail), a whiskey cocktail
  - Old fashioned glass, a type of drinking glass named after the cocktail
- Old Fashioned (film), a 2015 film by Rik Swartzwelder
- "Old-fashioned" (short story) a 1976 short story by Isaac Asimov
- "Old Fashioned" (Panic! at the Disco song), 2018
- "Old Fashioned" (Maisie Peters song), 2026
- Old Fashioned (horse), a racing horse
- Old-fashioned three, a basketball term
- Old-fashioned doughnut, a type of doughnut
- Old-fashioned oats, a type of rolled whole oats

== See also ==
- I'm Old Fashioned (disambiguation)
- Obsolescence
- Tradition
- Old Style (disambiguation)
- Old school (disambiguation)
