= Old Style (disambiguation) =

Old Style can refer to:

== Typography ==
- Old Style (Miller & Richard), a popular serif typeface
- Goudy Old Style, a typeface
- Old style figures, numerals with ascenders and descenders
- A colloquial name for Antiqua typeface class
- A colloquial name for Classical typeface class

== Other uses ==
- Old Style and New Style dates, a shift from the Julian to the Gregorian calendar: 1752 in Britain, 1918 in Russia
- Old Style Beer, a brand of beer brewed in Wisconsin and popular in Chicago

== See also ==
- Old-fashioned (disambiguation)
- Old-time music – Genre of folk music
