= Rick Stevens =

American computer scientist

Rick Stevens is a professor of computer science at the University of Chicago and associate laboratory director for Computing, Environment and Life Sciences (CELS) at Argonne National Laboratory.

== Early life and education ==
Stevens started programming at the age of 14 with IBM computer. From 1978 to 1980, Stevens attended Michigan State University where he majored in physics and computer science, before moving to Western Michigan University where he got his B.S. in applied mathematics and philosophy in 1984. Following it, he moved to the University of Illinois at Urbana–Champaign where he passed both M.S. and Ph.D. courses in applied mathematics, computer science and physics all in one year of studying. From 1986 to 1990, Stevens was enrolled into a Ph.D. program at the Robert R. McCormick School of Engineering and Applied Science of Northwestern University.

== Career ==
While studying at Michigan State University, Stevens served as applications programmer at its College of Natural Science. He then moved to McPartlin & Associates where he worked for one year as analyst and programmer, and following it, held the same position at Western Michigan University for a duration of a year as well. From 1982 to 1985, Stevens was a president of Auriga Software Company, and from 1982 to 1983 and 1983 to 1984 was a resident associate with Argonne National Laboratory and systems programmer with Western Michigan University. From 1985 to 1991, he was promoted to manager at the Advanced Computing Research Facility and in 1991 became associate division director of Argonne National Laboratory. In between those years, he also served as a leader of the Computing and Communications Futures Laboratory and was a director of the High-Performance Computing and Communications Program.

== Honors and recognitions ==
Stevens was elected a Fellow of the American Association for the Advancement of Science (AAAS) in 2003 and since then is a Fellow of the Institute of Electrical and Electronics Engineers (IEEE) in IEEE Computer Society, an ACM Fellow and a member of the Association for Automated Reasoning and the Association for Symbolic Logic.
