= I'm Old Fashioned (disambiguation) =

"I'm Old Fashioned" is a 1942 song composed by Jerome Kern, with lyrics written by Johnny Mercer.

I'm Old Fashioned may also refer to:

- I'm Old Fashioned (album), a 1976 album by Japanese saxophonist Sadao Watanabe
- I'm Old Fashioned (ballet), a 1983 ballet by Jerome Robbins

== See also ==
- Old-fashioned (disambiguation)
