= Bread Alone =

Studio album by Walter "Junie" Morrison
- Released: 1980
- Recorded: 1980
- Studio: Fifth Floor, Cincinnati, Ohio
- Genre: Funk
- Length: 31:34
- Label: Columbia
- Producer: Walter "Junie" Morrison for J.S. Theracon

Walter "Junie" Morrison chronology
Suzie Supergroupie (1976)	Bread Alone (1980)	Junie 5 (1981)

Bread Alone is a 1980 album by singer/multi-instrumentalist Walter "Junie" Morrison. The album was released by Columbia Records and was produced by Walter "Junie" Morrison for J.S. Theracon Productions. It was the first solo album released while simultaneously preparing to depart from Parliament-Funkadelic, where he served as keyboardist, co-writer, and co-producer. The album features vocal support from Lynn Mabry, formerly of the Brides of Funkenstein. The album cover shows Morrison surrounded by a thousand loaves of bread.

Bread Alone was reissued through the Sony Music Special Products series in 1991 but went out of print shortly thereafter. In 2011 it was reissued in the U.K. by Cherry Red Records imprint BBR and in the U.S. by Funky Town Grooves as a "two-fer" with his next chronological release, Junie 5.

== Critical reception ==
Professional ratings
Review scores
Source	Rating
AllMusic	4/5 stars

The New York Times wrote: "For the most part the music is attractively, danceably functional; Bread Alone is special because Mr. Morrison is interested in communicating a range of emotions as well as in providing dance floor fodder, and he does so in songs that are distinctively personal."

== Track listing ==
1. "Love Has Taken Me Over (Be My Baby)" (John Tinsley, Walter Morrison, Shermon Singleton) - 4:02
2. "Why?" (John Tinsley, Walter Morrison, Shermon Singleton) - 5:24
3. "Bread Alone" (John Tinsley, Shermon Singleton) - 4:28
4. "Nagual's Theme" (Walter Morrison) - 1:09
5. "Funky Parts" (Walter Morrison, Lynn Mabry, Shermon Singleton) - 4:29
6. "Seaman First Class (Jock Rock)" (Akasha Morrison, Walter Morrison, Lynn Mabry) - 7:59
7. "Apple Song" (Walter Morrison) - 4:01

== Personnel ==
- Walter "Junie" Morrison - lead vocals
- Lynn Mabry, Teresa Allman, Brenda Henderson, Akasha Morrison - backing vocals
- Wes "Duck Army" Boatman - synthesizer programming
- All instruments performed by Walter "Junie" Morrison

Technical

- Gary Platt - engineer, mixing
