= Non-Stop (B. T. Express album) =

Studio album by B. T. Express
- Released: July 1975
- Recorded: 1975
- Studio: Ultra-Sonic Recording Studios, Hempstead, New York
- Genre: Soul, funk
- Label: Roadshow Records
- Producer: Jeff Lane

B. T. Express chronology
Do It ('Til You're Satisfied) (1974)	Non-Stop (1975)	Energy to Burn (1976)

Professional ratings
Review scores
Source	Rating
AllMusic	4.5/5 stars

Non-Stop is the second album by the Brooklyn, New York, band B. T. Express. Released in July 1975, the album reached number one on the Billboard R&B albums chart in the US.

== Critical reception ==
Alex Henderson of Allmusic, in a 4.5\5 star review, exclaimed "When B.T. Express' second album, Non-Stop, came out in 1975, Scepter assumed that it would fare well in dance clubs -- and sure enough, club DJs went wild over this record...Up-tempo material is what defines Non-Stop and makes it one of the band's finest, most essential albums."

== Track listing ==
1. "Peace Pipe" - (Mark Barkan, Sam Taylor) 6:04
2. "Give It What You Got" - (Solomon Roberts) 4:19
3. "Discotizer" - (Hiram Bullock, Larry Alexander) 3:28
4. "Still Good - Still Like It" - (Sam Taylor) 4:28
5. "Close To You" - (Burt Bacharach - Hal David) 5:37
6. "You Got It - I Want It" - (Billy Barnes, Bob Levine, Don Thomas, Trade Martin) 5:25
7. "Devil's Workshop" - (Barbara Risbrook, William Risbrook) 4:00
8. "Happiness" - (Carlos Ward) 3:38
9. "Whatcha Think About That?" - (Richard Thompson) 4:05

== Personnel ==
- Richard Thompson - guitar, vocals
- Mark Radice - synthesizer (Moog and string ensemble)
- Louis Risbrook - vocals, bass, organ
- Terrell Wood - drums
- Dennis Rowe - congas, timbales
- Sam Taylor - rhythm guitar
- Bill Risbrook, Carlos Ward - saxophone, flute
- Irving Spice - strings
- Barbara Joyce - vocals

== Charts ==
Chart (1975)	Peak position
US Top LPs & Tape	19
US Top Soul LPs	1

=== Singles ===
Year	Single	Chart positions		
Year	Single	US	US R&B	US Dance
1975	"Give It What You Got"	40	5	—
1975	"Peace Pipe"	31	5	1

== See also ==
- List of Billboard number-one R&B albums of 1975
