= Skin Tight (album) =

Studio album by Ohio Players
- Released: April 1974
- Recorded: Paragon (Chicago, Illinois)
- Genres: Soul; funk
- Length: 41:11
- Label: Mercury
- Producer: Ohio Players

Ohio Players chronology
Ecstasy (1973)	Skin Tight (1974)	Climax (1974)

Singles from Skin Tight
- 1. "Jive Turkey (Part 1)" Released: 1974; 2. "Skin Tight" Released: 1974

Professional ratings
Review scores
Source	Rating
AllMusic	4.5/5 stars
Christgau's Record Guide	B

Skin Tight is the fifth studio album by the Ohio Players, released in April 1974. It is their first album released through the Mercury label and considered to be their commercial breakthrough.

== History ==
Skin Tight signified a turning point in the Ohio Players' career towards a more jazzy and polished funk sound. The album began the Players' dominant platinum-selling period, and would bring them a much bigger audience. In fact, this release would outsell all of their previous LPs combined. The band produced and recorded the album in Chicago, with Barry Mraz as recording engineer. The final mix was mastered by Lee Hulko.

It is the second of five Ohio Players albums announced also as a quadraphonic (4-channel stereo) release, the first of four for Mercury. However, it was never actually released as no known copies have surfaced even among collectors. According to Billboard, Skin Tight took the top position on the Black Albums chart for six weeks and missed the Top 10 on the Billboard 200 pop albums chart by one position.

== Covers ==
R.E.M. performed "Skin Tight" on their Green Tour in 1989. A live recording from Orlando, Florida, on April 30, 1989, was released as a B-side to "Stand". "Heaven Must Be Like This" was covered by Paul Jackson Jr. featuring Glenn Jones, on his 1993 album, A River in the Desert. D'Angelo also covered the song on the soundtrack to the 1998 motion picture Down in the Delta.

== Track listing ==
All tracks are written by James Williams, Billy Beck, Clarence Satchell, Leroy Bonner, Marshall Jones, Ralph Middlebrooks and Marvin Pierce.

Side one
No.	Title	Length
1.	"Skin Tight"	7:52
2.	"Streakin' Cheek to Cheek"	5:43
3.	"It's Your Night/Words of Love"	7:58

Side two
No.	Title	Length
1.	"Jive Turkey"	7:09
2.	"Heaven Must Be Like This"	7:18
3.	"Is Anybody Gonna Be Saved?"	4:56

== Personnel ==
- Leroy "Sugarfoot" Bonner – guitar, percussion, lead & background vocals
- Billy Beck – piano, organ, Fender Rhodes piano, Clavinet, ARP, percussion, lead & background vocals
- Marshall "Rock" Jones – bass
- James "Diamond" Williams – drums, chimes, percussion, lead & background vocals
- Ralph "Pee Wee" Middlebrooks – trumpet, trombone & background vocals
- Clarence "Satch" Satchell – baritone saxophone, tenor saxophone, flute, percussion, lead & background vocals
- Marvin "Merv" Pierce – trumpet, flugelhorn, valve trombone & background vocals

== Charts ==
Year	Chart	Peak
1974	U.S. Billboard Top LPs	11
1974	U.S. Billboard Top Soul LPs	1

Singles

Year	Single	Peak chart positions	
Year	Single	US	US R&B
1974	"Jive Turkey (Part 1)"	47	6
1974	"Skin Tight"	13	2

== See also ==
- List of Billboard number-one R&B albums of 1974
