= Everybody Up =

Studio album by Ohio Players
- Released: 1979
- Recorded: Paragon (Chicago), Ohio Players Studio, (Dayton), Fifth Floor (Cincinnati)
- Genres: Soul, funk
- Length: 39:52
- Label: Arista
- Producer: Ohio Players

Ohio Players chronology
Jass-Ay-Lay-Dee (1978)	Everybody Up (1979)	Tenderness (1981)

Singles from Everybody Up
- 1. "Everybody Up" Released: 1979

Everybody Up is the twelfth album by the Ohio Players. Released in 1979, it was their only album for Arista Records.

== Production ==
The Ohio Players added two percussionists prior to the recording of the album. All of the tracks were written and produced by the Ohio Players.

== Critical reception ==
Professional ratings
Review scores
Source	Rating
AllMusic	2.5/5 stars
Christgau's Record Guide	C+
The Encyclopedia of Popular Music	2/5 stars
Music Week	3/4 stars
The New Rolling Stone Record Guide	1/5 stars

The Oakland Post wrote that "the moment the needle hits the opening notes of the scorching 'Everybody Up', it's clear that their Arista Records debut finds them ready for action, ready to take [their] rightful place among class players from any state." Billboard praised the "tight, basic sound, unencumbered by overwrought string and horn arrangements."

== Track listing ==
Side 1

1. "Everybody Up" (9:32)
2. "Don't Say Goodbye" (5:45)
3. "Make Me Feel" (6:45)

Side 2

1. "Say It" (7:01)
2. "Take de Funk Off, Fly" (6:04)
3. "Something Special" (4:45)

== Charts ==
Chart (1979)	Peak
U.S. Billboard Top LPs	80
U.S. Billboard Top Soul LPs	19

Singles

Year	Single	Peak chart positions	
Year	Single	US	US R&B
1979	"Everybody Up"	—	33
