= Old school =

Old school, Old School, or Old Skool may refer to:

== Computers and gaming ==
- Old school gaming or retrogaming, playing and collecting obsolete computer, video, and arcade games
- Old School Renaissance, a trend in tabletop gaming
- Old School RuneScape, a playable 2007 version of the MMORPG RuneScape
- Oldskool, in demoscene, a production made before the mid-1990s

== Film and television ==
- Old School (2003 film), an American comedy film
- Old School (2002 film), a Nigerian comedy film
- Old School (TV series), a 2014 Australian drama series
- "Old School" (Brooklyn Nine-Nine), a 2013 television episode
- "Old School" (Runaways), a 2018 television episode
- "Old School" (Yin Yang Yo!), a 2006 television episode

== Literature ==
- Old School (novel), a 2003 novel by Tobias Wolff
- Old School: Life in the Sane Lane, a 2017 book by Bill O'Reilly and Bruce Feirstein
- Diary of a Wimpy Kid: Old School, a 2015 book by Jeff Kinney

== Music ==
=== Genres ===
- Old-school hip hop
- Oldskool hardcore or breakbeat hardcore
- Urban oldies, or Old School, a radio format

=== Performers ===
- Old School (quartet), an American barbershop quartet
- Ol' Skool, an American new jack swing group

=== Albums ===
- Old School (Helix album), 2019
- Old School (Nils Lofgren album), 2011
- Oldschool (Nena album), 2015
- Ol' School, by Ohio Players, 1996
- Old School (EP), by Tebey, 2016
- Old Skool (EP), by Armin van Buuren, 2016
- Old School, a box set by Alice Cooper, 2011

=== Songs ===
- "Old School" (Hedley song), 2008
- "Old School" (John Conlee song), 1985
- "Old School", by Aaliyah from Age Ain't Nothing but a Number, 1994
- "Old School", by Boss Hog, 1999
- "Old School", by Danger Doom from The Mouse and the Mask, 2005
- "Old School", by Overkill from ReliXIV, 2005
- "Oldschool", a 2015 song by Baby Alice
- "Old School", by Toby Keith from Peso in My Pocket, 2021
- "Old School", by Tupac Shakur, a B-side of "Dear Mama", 1995

== Other uses ==
- Old school (tattoo), a traditional tattoo style
- Old School–New School Controversy, a schism of the Presbyterian Church in the United States of America
- Old School, or arm twist ropewalk chop, a professional wrestling aerial technique used by The Undertaker
- Koryū, translated as "old school", a category of Japanese martial arts

== See also ==
- Retro style
- Vintage (design)
- Jeune École
