= Trade Martin =

American songwriter

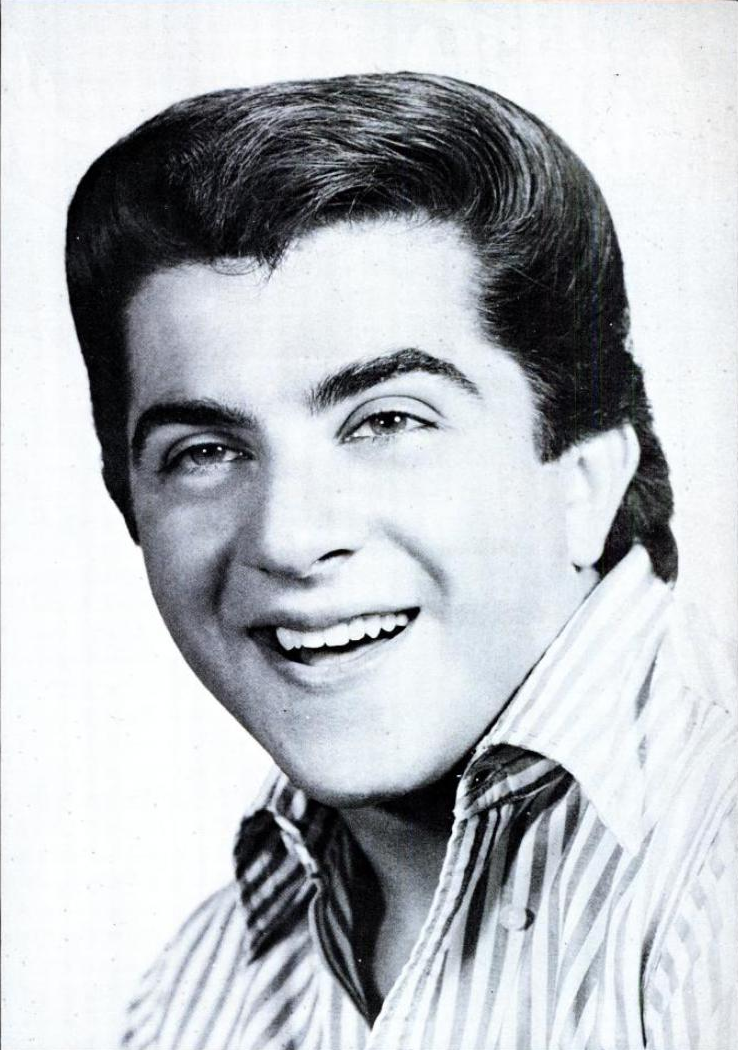
- Trade Martin in 1966

Background information
- Born: November 19, 1943 (age 81); Union City, New Jersey, U.S.
- Genres: Pop
- Occupation(s): Musician, songwriter, and producer
- Labels: Coed; Roulette; RCA Victor; Buddah

Trade Martin is an American musician, songwriter and producer.

Martin worked with Johnny Powers in the late 1950s, recording as Johnny & the Jokers and together launching the label Rome Records, active from 1960 to 1962. The label signed the groups The Earls, Del & the Escorts, and The Glens. On many of these recordings, Martin played all of the backing instruments, overdubbing them track by track. Martin also released some solo material on Coed Records, including the 1962 hit "That Stranger Used to Be My Girl", a #28 hit on the Billboard Hot 100 in 1962. He released several further singles on Roulette Records and other labels in the 1960s and an LP entitled Let Me Touch You on Buddah Records in 1972.

Martin spent nearly thirty years in production and arrangement, doing work from the 1960s girl group era through to 1980s pop. Among his credits are songs by Eric Andersen, Ellie Greenwich, Lesley Gore, The Tokens, Ian & Sylvia, Ricky Nelson, B.T. Express, Pam Russo, and Solomon Burke. He also wrote a number of songs covered by noted acts, including "Take Me for a Little While" (Evie Sands, Jackie Ross, Dusty Springfield, Vanilla Fudge) and "Peace to the World" (B. B. King).

Martin wrote several film scores. Credits include Made for Each Other, Hail, Stormy Monday, The Inkwell, It's My Party, and West New York.

Martin's single "We've Got To Stop The Mosque At Ground Zero" was released in August 2010.

In January 2011, rights-management firm Beach Road Music, LLC, content-owner of the Coed Records' catalog, re-released a digitally re-mastered version of Martin's 1964 Coed single "Liverpool Baby" on the compilation album From The Vault: The Coed Records Lost Master Tapes, Volume 1.

Martin has been a long-time resident of Weehawken, New Jersey.
