= Do It ('Til You're Satisfied) =

Single by B. T. Express

from the album Do It ('Til You're Satisfied)
- Released: August 27, 1974
- Genre: Disco; funk
- Length: 5:52 (album version); 3:09 (single edit)
- Label: Scepter
- Songwriter: William Nichols
- Producers: Jeff Lane; Dock Productions

B. T. Express singles chronology
"Do It ('Til You're Satisfied)" (1974)	"Express" (1975)

"Do It ('Til You're Satisfied)" is a popular song by funk group B. T. Express, written by songwriter Billy Nichols.

== Background ==
Released from the debut album of the same title, the song became a great "crossover" success. The song is noted for its hand claps at the beginning, as well as the spoken portion in the middle of the song. The short version was less than 3 minutes, while the long version is over 5 minutes in length. This song was considered suggestive of sexual intercourse, especially for the repeated lines in the coda section: "I'm Satisfied".

== Chart performance ==
The single went to No. 1 to the R&B singles chart for a week during the autumn of 1974 and went to No. 2 on the Billboard Hot 100 singles chart for two weeks.("Whatever Gets You thru the Night" by John Lennon and "I Can Help" by Billy Swan kept the song from the No. 1 spot). "Do It ('Til You're Satisfied)" was an early disco hit peaking at number eight on the disco/dance charts.

=== Weekly charts ===
Chart (1974–1975)	Peak position
Australia (Kent Music Report)	43
Canada RPM Top Singles	7
Germany	33
Netherlands	18
U.S. Billboard Hot 100	2
U.S. Billboard R&B	1
U.S. Billboard Dance/Disco	8
U.S. Cash Box Top 100	6

=== Year-end charts ===
Chart (1974)	Rank
Canada	122

Chart (1975)	Rank
U.S. Billboard Hot 100	80
U.S. Cash Box	99

== Certifications ==
Region	Certification	Certified units/sales
United States (RIAA)	Gold	1,000,000^{^}
^{^} Shipments figures based on certification alone.

== In popular culture ==
- The song was used as the opening theme for the late night talk show The Mo'Nique Show weeknights on Black Entertainment Television.
- The song was featured in Invincible (2006 film).
- The song is also featured on the in-game radio station "Lowdown FM" within Grand Theft Auto V.

== Samples ==
The single was one of three sampled in the 2002 song "Addictive" by Truth Hurts featuring Rakim.
