= Pleasure (Ohio Players album) =

Studio album by Ohio Players
- Released: December 1972
- Studio: Artie Fields (Detroit, Michigan)
- Genre: Soul; funk
- Length: 30:35
- Label: Westbound
- Producer: Ohio Players

Ohio Players chronology
Pain (1972)	Pleasure (1972)	Ecstasy (1973)

Singles from Pleasure
- 1. "Pleasure" Released: 1972; 2. "Varee Is Love" Released: 1972; 3. "Funky Worm" Released: January 16, 1973

Professional ratings
Review scores
Source	Rating
AllMusic	4/5 stars

Pleasure is the third studio album by American funk band Ohio Players and the second released through the Westbound label in December 1972.

== History ==
Pleasure continues with vocal harmonies more reminiscent of earlier work than what the Ohio Player would do when they moved to Mercury two years later and would often show jazz tendencies with some of their musical arrangements. The songs are a mixture of radio-friendly material with songs that come off as late night studio jam sessions, such as "Walt's First Trip".

The song "Funky Worm" was released as a single and went to #1 on the Billboard R&B charts, their biggest hit during their time with Westbound. The song, about a unique worm that enjoyed going in mysterious places, would later be sampled by a number of producers of hip-hop and R&B music during the late 1980s and early 1990s. The single and album mixes of "Funky Worm" are slightly different, most notably the opening drum break and the synthesizer solo that represents the sound of the worm.

The album was produced by the band, and engineered by Arlen Smith. The cover photo was taken by Joel Brodsky.

== Track listing ==
All tracks are written by Ohio Players.

Side one
No.	Title	Length
1.	"Pleasure"	5:26
2.	"Laid It"	3:00
3.	"Pride and Vanity"	4:22
4.	"Walt's First Trip"	3:08

Side two
No.	Title	Length
1.	"Varee Is Love"	2:43
2.	"Walked Away from You"	2:29
3.	"Paint Me"	2:02
4.	"Funky Worm"	2:35
5.	"Our Love Has Died"	4:50

== Personnel ==
- Ohio Players – producers, arrangements
- Arlen Smith – engineer
- David Krieger – art direction
- Joel Brodsky – photography
- Mia Krinsky – album co-ordination
- Bob Scerbo – art production supervision

== Charts ==
Chart (1972)	Peak
U.S. Billboard Top LPs	63
U.S. Billboard Top Soul LPs	4

=== Singles ===
Year	Single	Peak chart positions	
Year	Single	US	US R&B
1972	"Pleasure"	—	45
1972	"Varee Is Love"	—	—
1973	"Funky Worm"	15	1
