= Express (B. T. Express song) =

Single by B. T. Express

from the album Do It ('Til You're Satisfied)
- Released: 1974
- Genre: R&B; funk; disco
- Length: 5:03 (album version); 3:25 (single edit)
- Label: Scepter
- Songwriter: B. T. Express
- Producers: Jeff Lane; Dock Productions

B. T. Express singles chronology
"Do It ('Til You're Satisfied)" (1974)	"Express" (1974)	"That's What I Want for You Baby" (1974)

"Express" is a 1974 instrumental written and performed by B. T. Express. It features the sounds of train whistles, which are heard in several sections of the instrumental track. Only the words: "Here comes the Express/ The Express/ Chug, Chug, Chug, Chug, Chug, UGH"/ are said.

== Chart performance ==
"Express" reached No. 4 on the US pop chart, No. 1 on the US R&B chart, and No. 1 on the US dance chart for 5 consecutive weeks. Outside the US, the song peaked at No. 34 on the UK Singles Chart and a remix of it made No. 67 in the UK in 1994.

== Certifications ==
Certifications for "Express"
Region	Certification	Certified units/sales
Canada (Music Canada)	Gold	75,000^{^}
United States (RIAA)	Gold	1,000,000^{^}
^{^} Shipments figures based on certification alone.

== See also ==
- List of Billboard number-one disco singles of 1974
