= Mr. Mean (film) =

1977 film by Fred Williamson

- Directed by: Fred Williamson
- Written by: Fred Williamson
- Produced by: Fred Williamson
- Starring: Fred Williamson
- Cinematography: Maurizio Maggi
- Edited by: Amedeo Moriani
- Music by: Ohio Players
- Production company: Po' Boy Productions
- Distributed by: Lone Star Pictures International
- Release date: December 1977
- Running time: 77 minutes
- Countries: Italy; United States
- Language: English

Mr. Mean is a 1977 action crime film written and directed by Fred Williamson.

== Plot ==
Mr. Mean is hired by a former Cosa Nostra henchman to kill a mafia leader named Ranati who is embarrassing the mafia by stealing from the impoverished through fake charitable organizations. He then becomes a target himself.

== Cast ==
- Fred Williamson as Mr. Mean
- Lou Castel as Huberto
- Raimund Harmstorf as Rommell
- Crippy Yocard as Rene
- Antonio Maimone as Rico
- Rita Silva as Carla
- Pat Brocato as Tony
- David Mills as Lieutenant Rigoli
- Stelio Candelli as Ranati
- Tawfiq Said as Driver
- Angela Doria as Farm Girl
- Richard Oneto as Man
- Satch as Himself
- Charles Borromel as Johnny
- Ohio Players as Themselves
- Angelo Ragusa as Thug (uncredited)
- Franco Ukmar as Thug (uncredited)

== Production ==
Fred Williamson produced Mr. Mean while filming The Inglorious Bastards by taking the camera equipment and crew every weekend, without the producers’ knowledge. He wrote the story Monday to Friday and shot on the weekends what he had written that week.

== Release ==
Mr. Mean was released theatrically with an "R" rating. It was later released on VHS by Rhino and on Blu-ray by Code Red.

== Soundtrack ==
The Ohio Players appear in the film as themselves and offer to play a song they have written for Fred Williamson's character Mr. Mean. They then play the title song "Mr. Mean" from the eponymous soundtrack album as the opening credits to the film roll. The soundtrack was released in December 1977.

== Reception ==
The film review website Pulp International gave the film a negative review, writing of Williamson, "He should have done better, since this was his fifth go-round of nearly twenty in the director's chair. Possibly the studio messed up his final cut. Or, considerably more likely, it was a disaster from the snap." The review concludes that Williamson "just dropped the ball."

The film review website spicyonion.com wrote that "Mr. Mean certainly fulfills audience expectations".

Charlie Jane Anders of Gizmodo listed Mr. Mean as one of the reasons "you would think people would have learned not to fuck with Fred Williamson".

Brad Avery of vanyaland.com described Mr. Mean as one of Williamson's "more macho characters".

The Department of Afro American Research, Arts, and Culture added the film's poster to its archive, writing, "dead men tell no tales, but some men are just too mean to die!"
