= Fire (Ohio Players song) =

1974 song by Ohio Players

- Side A of the US single

Single by Ohio Players

from the album Fire
- B-side: "Together"
- Released: November 1974
- Genre: Funk
- Length: 3:12 (single version); 4:36 (album version)
- Label: Mercury
- Songwriters: Billy Beck, Leroy "Sugarfoot" Bonner, Marshall "Rock" Jones, Ralph "Pee Wee" Middlebrooks, Marvin "Merv" Pierce, Clarence "Satch" Satchell, James "Diamond" Williams
- Producer: Ohio Players

Ohio Players singles chronology
"Skin Tight" (1974)	"Fire" (1974)	"I Want to Be Free" (1975)

"Fire" is a song by R&B/funk band Ohio Players. It was the opening track from the album of the same name and hit No. 1 on both the Billboard Hot 100 and the Hot Soul Singles chart in early 1975. It spent two weeks atop the soul chart. "Fire" was the Ohio Players' only entry on the new disco/dance chart, where it peaked at No. 10. The song is considered to be the band's signature one, along with "Love Rollercoaster".

== Background ==
The song was recorded at Paragon Studios Chicago. While performing in California, the band let Stevie Wonder hear the basic track and he predicted that it would become a big hit. The song is noted for its sound of a siren recorded from a fire truck, heard at the beginning, as well as in the instrumental break in the middle. The edited version avoided much of the repetition of the music. The composer of Wild Cherry's hit song "Play That Funky Music" has indicated that "Fire" was the inspiration.

== Charts ==
Chart (1974–1975)	Peak position
Canada Top Singles (RPM)	5
US Billboard Hot 100	1
US Billboard Hot Soul Singles	1

== Cover versions ==
- In 1987, Canadian rock band Platinum Blonde released a cover on their album Contact which peaked at No. 49 on the Canadian RPM chart in 1988.
- Also in 1987, Jamaican reggae duo Sly and Robbie covered the song for their album Rhythm Killers. It was released as a single and reached No. 60 on the UK Singles Chart.

== Sampling ==
It was sampled in Da Lench Mob's "You and Your Heroes" from Guerillas in tha Mist.

== In popular culture ==
"Fire" served as the theme song for seasons 1–18 of the American reality cooking show Hell's Kitchen.

The song was played in Kangaroo Jack: G'Day U.S.A.!.
