= Sweet Sticky Thing =

Single by The Ohio Players

from the album Honey
- B-side: "Alone"
- Released: August 9, 1975
- Genre: Funk
- Length: 3:25 (Single version); 6:12 (Album version)
- Label: Mercury
- Songwriters: William "Billy" Beck, Leroy "Sugarfoot" Bonner, Marshall "Rock" Jones, Ralph "Pee Wee" Middlebrooks, Marvin Pierce, Clarence "Satch" Satchell, James "Diamond" Williams
- Producer: The Ohio Players

The Ohio Players singles chronology
| "I Want to Be Free" (1975) | "Sweet Sticky Thing" (1975) | "Love Rollercoaster" (1975) |

"Sweet Sticky Thing" is the name of a popular song by funk band Ohio Players, and released on the classic 1975 album, Honey. The song spent a week at number one on the Hot Soul Singles chart. It peaked at number 33 on the Billboard Hot 100 singles chart. It was the third of five songs that they would take to the top of the R&B chart.

== Chart positions ==
| Charts | Peak position |
|---|---|
| U.S. Billboard Hot 100 | 33 |
| U.S. Billboard Hot Soul Singles | 1 |

== Cover versions ==
- In 1993, French pianist Alex Bugnon covered the song on his album This Time Around.
- In 2020, Japanese trumpeter Takuya Kuroda covered the song on his album Fly Moon Die Soon.
