= Love Rollercoaster =

1975 single by Ohio Players

Single by Ohio Players

from the album Honey
- B-side: "It's All Over"
- Released: November 9, 1975
- Genre: Funk; disco
- Length: 2:52 (single version); 4:50 (album version)
- Label: Mercury
- Songwriters: James Williams; Clarence Satchell; Leroy Bonner; Marshall Jones; Ralph Middlebrooks; Marvin Pierce; William Beck
- Producer: Ohio Players

Ohio Players singles chronology
"Sweet Sticky Thing" (1975)	"Love Rollercoaster" (1975)	"Fopp" (1976)

"Love Rollercoaster", sometimes rendered as "Love Roller Coaster", is a song by American funk/R&B band Ohio Players, originally featured on their 1975 album Honey. It was composed by William Beck, Leroy Bonner, Marshall Jones, Ralph Middlebrooks, Marvin Pierce, Clarence Satchell, and James Williams. It was a number-one U.S. hit in January 1976, and was certified gold. In Canada, the song spent two weeks at number two. "Love Rollercoaster" was covered by American rock band Red Hot Chili Peppers for the soundtrack of the 1996 animated movie Beavis and Butt-Head Do America.

== Urban legend ==
The song has been the subject of a persistent urban legend since its release. A scream is heard in the background fairly early in the song (between 1:24 and 1:28 on the single version, or between 2:32 and 2:36 on the album version). According to the most common legend, it was the voice of an individual being murdered live while the tape was rolling. Jimmy "Diamond" Williams described the innocent nature of the scream:

There is a part in the song where there's a breakdown. It's guitars and it's right before the second verse and Billy Beck does one of those inhaling-type screeches like Minnie Riperton did to reach her high note or Mariah Carey does to go octaves above. The DJ made this crack and it swept the country. People were asking us, "Did you kill this girl in the studio?" The band took a vow of silence because you sell more records that way.

The legend appears to have evolved from an incidental comment made by an unidentified Berkeley, California disc jockey during a radio broadcast, probably in late 1975 or early 1976. It spread and mutated in several variations, probably as a result of Casey Kasem having repeated it on the nationally syndicated radio show American Top 40 in early 1976. The most common version of the legend was that the scream was from Ester Cordet, a model who appeared on the cover of the album (Honey) purportedly stabbed by a band member, manager or engineer during the recording sessions. Subsequent variations included an elaborate backstory involving the artwork on the album cover as a motive for the stabbing. Less common variations identified the "victim" as a band member's girlfriend or cleaning woman.

The 1998 film Urban Legend mentions the legend of this song.

== Charts ==
=== Weekly charts ===
Chart (1975–1976)	Peak position
Canada Top Singles (RPM)	2
US Billboard Hot 100	1
US Hot Soul Singles (Billboard)	1

=== Year-end charts ===
Chart (1976)	Rank
Canada Top Singles (RPM)	39
US Billboard Hot 100	30

== Red Hot Chili Peppers version ==
"Love Rollercoaster"

Single by Red Hot Chili Peppers

from the album Beavis and Butt-Head Do America: Original Motion Picture Soundtrack
- A-side: "Lesbian Seagull" (by Engelbert Humperdinck)
- Released: November 12, 1996
- Genre: Alternative rock
- Length: 4:37 (album version); 3:31 (single version)
- Label: Geffen
- Songwriters: James Williams; Clarence Satchell; Leroy Bonner; Marshall Jones; Ralph Middlebrooks; Marvin Pierce; William Beck
- Producers: Sylvia Massy; Red Hot Chili Peppers

Red Hot Chili Peppers singles chronology
"Coffee Shop" (1996)	"Love Rollercoaster" (1996)	"Scar Tissue" (1999)

Engelbert Humperdinck singles chronology
"Moonlight Angel" (1993)	"Lesbian Seagull" (1996)	"Release Me / Gotta Get Release" (1998)

"Love Rollercoaster" was covered by American rock band Red Hot Chili Peppers for the soundtrack of the 1996 animated movie Beavis and Butt-Head Do America, based on the iconic MTV adult animated series Beavis and Butt-Head, so it had a lot of diffusion on the channel in that time. It was released as a single in November 1996 through Geffen Records, being particularly successful in the UK.

For this version, an animated music video was made directed by Kevin Lofton. In the video, the members of the band are shown performing the song and riding together with other characters on a gigantic roller coaster, while playing some scenes from the film.

=== Charts ===
==== Weekly charts ====
Chart (1996–1997)	Peak position
Australia (ARIA) with "Lesbian Seagull"	19
Belgium (Ultratip Bubbling Under Flanders)	10
Canada Top Singles (RPM)	49
Canada Rock/Alternative (RPM)	3
Iceland (Íslenski Listinn Topp 40)	3
Ireland (IRMA)	24
New Zealand (Recorded Music NZ) with "Lesbian Seagull"	35
Scottish Singles Sales (Official Charts)	6
UK Singles (Official Charts)	7
US Radio Songs (Billboard)	40
US Alternative Airplay (Billboard)	14
US Pop Airplay (Billboard)	22

==== Year-end charts ====
Chart (1997)	Position
Australia (ARIA)	83
Canada Rock/Alternative (RPM)	45
Iceland (Íslenski Listinn Topp 40)	94
UK Singles (OCC)	119
US Modern Rock Tracks (Billboard)	74
US Top 40/Mainstream (Billboard)	72

=== Release history ===
Region	Date	Format(s)	Label(s)	Ref.
United States	November 12, 1996	Contemporary hit radio	Geffen	
Australia	January 12, 1997	CD	Geffen	
United Kingdom	June 2, 1997	7-inch vinyl; CD; cassette	Geffen	

== In other media ==
The song was used, amongst other uses, in an advert for the Suzuki Jimny mini-SUV automobile, in the 2020 film Harley Quinn: Birds of Prey, and in a promo for the Disney Epcot ride Guardians of the Galaxy: Cosmic Rewind ahead of its opening in 2022; the song, although not played outright, is also referenced to on The Cleveland Show, serving as the title for the show's 11th episode of its pilot season. It was also used in the 2006 horror movie Final Destination 3, and was also used in 2004 action-adventure video game Grand Theft Auto: San Andreas as song for radio station Bounce FM. The Red Hot Chili Peppers version is used heavily in a scene from Beavis and Butthead Do America, where they are in a casino.

The song is also one of five songs covered on Rock n' Roller Coaster starring the Muppets, performed by guest stars Jennifer Hudson and Questlove.

== See also ==
- Hot 100 number-one hits of 1976 (United States)
