= B. T. Express =

American funk/disco group

B.T. Express
- Origin: Brooklyn, New York, U.S.
- Genres: Funk, disco, soul
- Years active: 1974–1987
- Labels: Scepter Records, Roadshow Records, Columbia Records, Coast To Coast Records (division of CBS/Columbia Records), Earthtone Recording Company, King Davis Records

B.T. Express (originally named Brooklyn Transit Express) was an American funk/disco group that had a number of successful songs during the 1970s.

== Background ==
According to a Record World article in March, 1975, the King Davis House Rockers begat the Madison Street Express which begat Brothers Trucking which begat B.T. Express. At the time, the group consisted of Rich Thompson on lead guitar and Bill Risbrook on tenor saxophone who were the nucleus of King House Rockers. Also in the group were Louis Risbrook on bass, who was the brother of Bill on solo flute, alto sax, piccolo and clarinet. There was also Olando T. Woods on drums and singer Barbara Joyce Lomas. The latest member was Dennis Rowe on congas. Carlos Ward who was born in Panama had played with the John Coltrane Octet, Don Cherry, Pharoah Sanders, and McCoy Tyner. Barbara Joyce Lomas who came from Alabama had been with the Uptights and sang on their single, "Free at Last" b/w "You Git’s None of This", released on Skye Records SKYE 4525.

== Beginnings ==
The group was part of the "Brooklyn sound" of the early 1970s, formed from three players of the group King Davis House Rockers. The House Rockers were a local dance band who had released a couple of obscure singles (1967's "We All Make Mistakes Sometimes" on Verve Records, 1972's "Rum Punch").

The single, "Baby You Satisfy Me" b/w "We All Make Mistakes Sometimes" was credited to King Davis House Rockers featuring Richard Thomas, and was released on Verve VK 10492 in February 1967. In 1969, the King Davis produced "What Do I Have to Do" b/w "We All Make Mistakes Sometimes", credited to Rick Thompson was released on Columbia 4-44880. There was also a single by The Visitors, "Holiday in Love" b/w "Rum Punch" which was released on Airways LK-2000. It was composed by L. Risbrook, C. Ward and C. Stephenson. It was co-produced by Stephenson and King Davis. It was also released on Straker's Records S-0046 with "Rum Punch" as the A side.

The three players (guitarist Richard Thompson, tenor sax player Bill Risbrook, and alto sax player Carlos Ward) formed Madison Street Express along with bassist Louis Risbrook (later Muslim-monickered Jamal Rasool), percussionist Dennis Rowe, drummer Terrell Wood, and vocalist Barbara Wood.

== Career ==
The members of Madison Street Express along with producer Jeff Lane signed with production company Roadshow Records to record writer Billy Nichols's "Do It ('Til You're Satisfied)". The record was shopped around to major labels until it was accepted at Scepter Records. Scepter suggested the group change its name from Madison Street Express, hence the Brooklyn Transit Express. The single was released in August 1974, and reached the top 10. Lane took the group back into the studios at that point to record a second single and pitch a full album to the label. Scepter agreed to the LP and to Roadshow Records having its own label within Scepter Records.

The first two singles were hits, both number 1 R&B releases and both Top 5 pop singles in the US. The album hit number 1 on the R&B album chart and number 5 on the Pop album chart of the US. These recordings were also hits in the spreading disco culture, "Do It" peaking on club playlists before Billboard started a separate disco chart, but the follow-up single sat for five weeks at number 1. They were certified gold releases.

BT Express released an album per year through 1978. With the third album, Leslie Ming was brought in as drummer and Michael Jones was added as keyboardist. Jamal, who had converted to Islam, gave Jones the name Kashif Saleem, which he used after departing the group, in 1979, to pursue producing ("Mighty M Productions" with Morrie Brown and Paul Laurence Jones) and solo recording ventures. That year, songwriter Billy Nichols and drummer Leslie Ming also departed the group. In 1976 Scepter records was experiencing business difficulties that soon ended the company, and BT Express was given a distribution deal with Columbia Records, which, though it gave them greater exposure, resulted in less attention being paid to their production, since they had so many acts to concentrate on. The group did not achieve the level of radio or sales success on Columbia that they had on the more nurturing but by-then defunct Scepter. They stayed with Columbia for five years, with Lane producing through 1978, then Nichols producing their fifth album before he departed for solo work, and Morrie Brown producing the sixth LP and several follow-up tracks. The group switched labels to Coast To Coast Records for the 1982 LP, to Earthtone Records for a later 1982 single, and to manager King Davis' own label in 1985.

Michael Jones, later known as Kashif died at his home in the Playa del Rey neighborhood of Los Angeles, on September 25, 2016, at age 59.

== Members ==
=== Original lineup ===
- Richard “Rick” Thompson - guitar, vocals
- Bill Risbrook - tenor saxophone, flute, vocals
- Terrell Wood - drums
- Barbara Joyce Lomas - vocals
- Carlos Ward - alto sax, flute, piccolo, woodwind
- Dennis Rowe - percussion
- Louis Risbrook (later known as Jamal Rasool) - bass, vocals

== Discography ==
Early related singles
Act	Release	Catalogue	Year	Notes #
King Davis House Rockers featuring Richard Thomas	"Baby You Satisfy Me" / "We All Make Mistakes Sometimes"	Verve VK 10492	1967	
Rick Thompson	"What Do I Have to Do" / "We All Make Mistakes Sometimes"	Columbia 4-44880	1969	
The Visitors	"Holiday in Love" / "Rum Punch"	Airways LK-2000		
The Visitors	"Rum Punch" / "Holiday in Love"	Straker's Records S-0046		

Singles
Release	Catalogue	Year	Notes #
"Do It ('Til You're Satisfied)" / "Do It ('Til You're Satisfied) Part II"	Scepter SCE 12395	1974	
"Express" / "Express (Disco Mix)"	Roadshow RD 7001	1975	
"Give It What You Got" / "Peace Pipe"	Roadshow RD 7003	1975	
"Close to You" / "Whatcha Think About That?"	Roadshow RD 7005	1975	
"Can't Stop Groovin' Now, Wanna Do It Some More" / "Herbs"	Columbia 3-10346	1976	
"Energy to Burn" / "Make Your Body Move"	Columbia 3-10399	1976	
"Funky Music (Don't Laugh at My Funk)" / We Got It Together"	Columbia 3-10582	1977	
"Shout It Out" / "Ride on B.T."	Columbia 3-10649	1977	
"What Do You Do in the Dark" / "You Got Something"	Columbia 3-10752	1978	
"Give Up the Funk (Let's Dance)" / "Better Late than Never"	Columbia 1-11249	1980	
"Does It Feel Good" / "Have Some Fun"	Columbia 1-11336	1980	
"Let Yourself Go" / "Cowboy Dancer"	Coast to Coast ZS5 02630	1981	
"Keep It Up" / "Dancin' Dream"	Coast to Coast ZS5 02994	1982	
"Star Child (Spirit of the Night)" / "Just Can't Stop Dancin'"	Coast to Coast ZS4 03246	1982	
"Hangin' Out" / "Hangin' Out (Instrumental)"	Earthtone ET-7003	1983	
"Express" / "Do It ('Til You're Satisfied)"	Collectables COL. 3843	?	

Compilation albums
Release	Catalogue	Year	Notes #
Greatest Hits	Columbia JC 36923	1980	
Golden Classics	Collectables COL-CD-5190	1989	
The Best of B.T. Express	Rhino R2 72735, A 28585	1997	Compact disc

=== Chart history ===
==== Studio albums ====
Year	Title	Peak chart positions				Certifications	Record label
Year	Title	US	US R&B	AUS	CAN	Certifications	Record label
1974	Do It ('Til You're Satisfied)	5	1	43	22	RIAA: Gold	Roadshow/Scepter
1975	Non-Stop	19	1	60	36		Roadshow
1976	Energy to Burn	43	11	90	—		Columbia
1977	Function at the Junction	111	39	—	—		Columbia
1978	Shout! (Shout It Out)	67	16	—	59		Columbia
1980	1980	164	29	—	—		Columbia
1982	Keep It Up	—	49	—	—		Coast to Coast/Roadshow
"—" denotes a recording that did not chart or was not released in that territory.

==== Singles ====
Year	Title	Peak chart positions								Certifications	Album
Year	Title	US	US R&B	US Dan	BEL	CAN	GER	NL	UK	Certifications	Album
1974	"Do It ('Til You're Satisfied)"	2	1	8	29	7	33	18	51 (Note: Chart position is from the official UK "Breakers List".)	RIAA: Gold	Do It ('Til You're Satisfied)
1974	"Express"	4	1	1	—	3	34	—	34	RIAA: Gold; MC: Gold	Do It ('Til You're Satisfied)
1974	"That's What I Want for You Baby"	—	—	11	—	—	—	—	—		Do It ('Til You're Satisfied)
1975	"Give It What You Got" (A-side)	40	5	—	—	41	—	—	—		Non-Stop
1975	"Peace Pipe" (B-side)	31	—	3	—	56	—	—	—		Non-Stop
1976	"Close to You"	82	31	—	—	66	—	—	—		Non-Stop
1976	"Can't Stop Groovin' Now, Wanna Do It Some More"	52	6	13	—	—	—	—	—		Energy to Burn
1976	"Energy to Burn"	—	37	—	—	—	—	—	—		Energy to Burn
1977	"Funky Music (Don't Laugh at My Funk)"	—	—	—	—	—	—	—	—		Function at the Junction
1977	"Shout It Out"	—	12	—	—	90	—	—	—		Shout! (Shout It Out)
1978	"What You Do in the Dark"	—	—	—	—	—	—	—	—		Shout! (Shout It Out)
1980	"Give Up the Funk (Let's Dance)"	—	24	22	—	—	—	—	52		1980
1980	"Does It Feel Good"	—	76	—	—	—	—	—	52		1980
1980	"Stretch"	—	51	—	—	—	—	—	—		Greatest Hits
1981	"Let Yourself Go"	—	—	—	—	—	—	—	—		Keep It Up
1982	"Keep It Up"	—	—	—	—	—	—	—	—		Keep It Up
1982	"Star Child (Spirit of the Night)"	—	—	—	—	—	—	—	—		Keep It Up
1983	"Hangin' Out"	—	—	—	—	—	—	—	—		—N/a
1983	"This Must Be the Night"	—	—	—	—	—	—	—	—		—N/a
1994	"Express '94"	—	—	—	—	—	—	—	67		—N/a
"—" denotes a recording that did not chart or was not released in that territory.

== See also ==
- List of artists who reached number one on the U.S. dance chart
