= Ohio Players =

American funk and R&B band

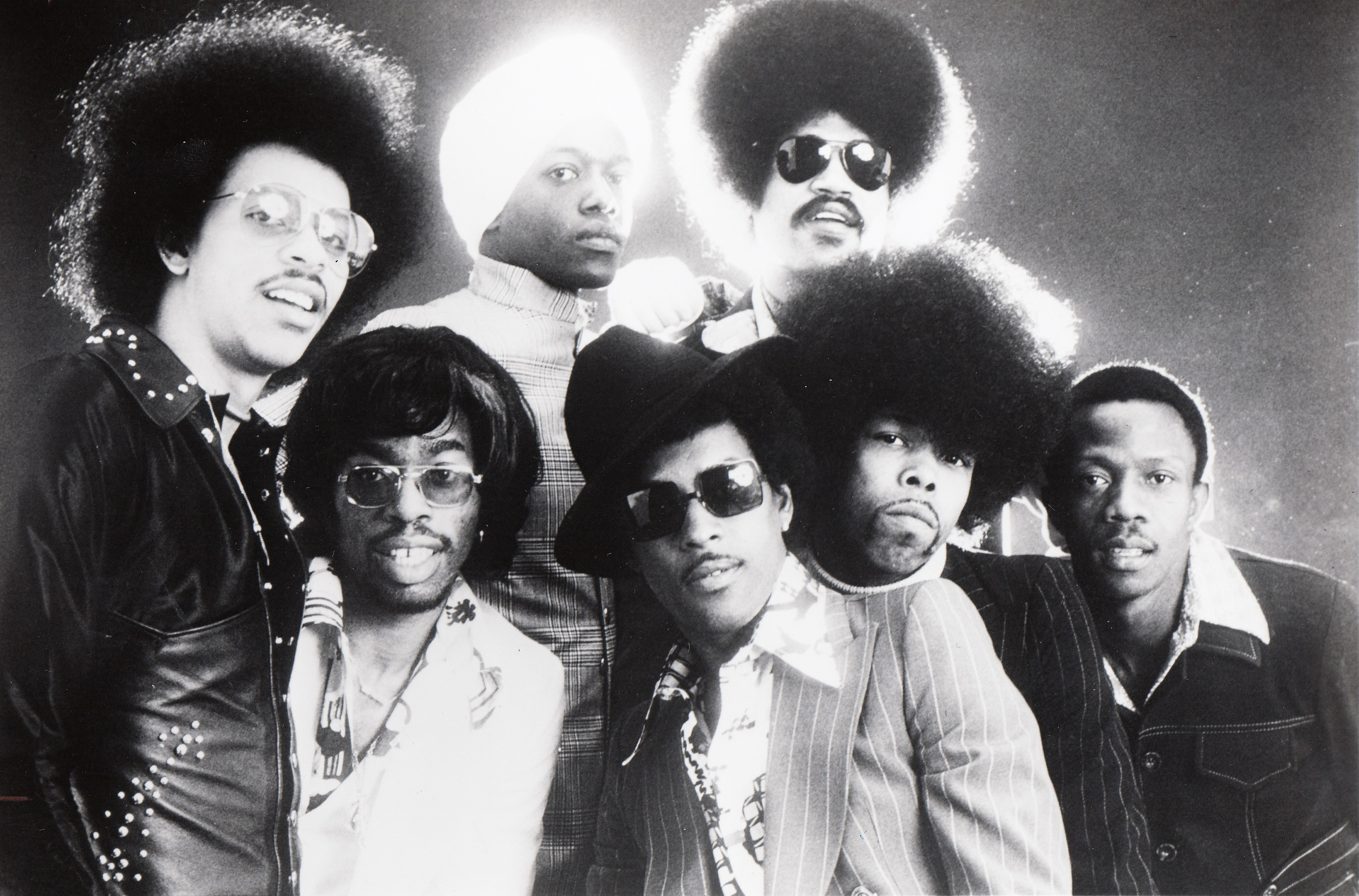
- Ohio Players c. 1975

Background information
- Also known as: The Ohio Untouchables (1959–1967)
- Origin: Dayton, Ohio, United States
- Genres: Funk; progressive soul; Latin
- Years active: 1967–present
- Labels: Capitol; Westbound; Mercury; Arista; Boardwalk
- Website: theofficialohioplayers.com

Ohio Players are an American funk band formed in Dayton, Ohio. They were most popular in the 1970s and are best known for their songs "Fire" and "Love Rollercoaster", and for their erotic album covers that featured nude or nearly nude women. Many of the women were models featured in Playboy.

The singles "Funky Worm", "Skin Tight", "Fire" and "Love Rollercoaster" and their albums Skin Tight, Fire and Honey, were awarded Gold certification.

On August 17, 2013, Ohio Players were inducted into the inaugural class of the Rhythm and Blues Music Hall of Fame that took place at Cleveland State University in Cleveland, Ohio.

== History ==
=== 1959–1967: Ohio Untouchables ===
The members first came together in Dayton, Ohio, in 1959 as the Ohio Untouchables. The group included members Robert Ward (vocals/guitar), Marshall "Rock" Jones (bass), Clarence "Satch" Satchell (saxophone/guitar), Cornelius Johnson (drums), and Ralph "Pee Wee" Middlebrooks (trumpet/trombone). They were best known at the time as a backing group for The Falcons.

Ward proved to be an unreliable leader, who would sometimes walk off the stage during gigs, forcing the group to stop playing. Eventually, the group vowed to keep playing even after he left. Ward and Jones got into a fistfight in 1964, after which the group broke up.

Ward found new backups, and the group's core members returned to Dayton. They replaced Ward with 21-year-old Leroy "Sugarfoot" Bonner (guitar), who would become the group's frontman, and added Greg Webster (drums). To accommodate Bonner's musical style preferences for the group ("R&B with a little flair to it") and to avoid competing with Ward, the group changed their format.

By 1967, the group had renamed themselves the Ohio Players, reflecting its members' self-perceptions as musicians and as ladies' men.

The group added two more singers, Bobby Lee Fears and Dutch Robinson and became the house band for the New York–based Compass Records. In 1970, the group disbanded temporarily.

=== 1970–1972 ===
After re-forming with Bonner, Satchell, Middlebrooks, Jones, Webster, trumpeter Bruce Napier, vocalist Charles Dale Allen, trombonist Marvin Pierce and vocalist/keyboardist Walter "Junie" Morrison, the group had a minor hit on the Detroit-based Westbound label with "Pain" (1971; from their second album, Pain), which reached the Top 40 of the Billboard R&B record chart. James Johnson joined the group on the following album, Pleasure (1972) as vocalist/saxophonist, replacing Charles Dale Allen. The two albums' covers featured a black-leather-bikini-clad bald model, Pat "Running Bear" Evans, who would later appear on additional Ohio Players albums, including Climax, Ecstasy, and Rattlesnake.

=== 1972–1979: Success ===
James "Diamond" Williams, drummer and vocalist, replaced Webster in 1972. The next year, the band released its first successful single, "Funky Worm", which reached number 1 on the Billboard R&B chart and peaked at number 15 on the Hot 100 in May 1973. It sold over one million copies and was awarded a gold disc by the R.I.A.A. The Ohio Players followed the single's success with the album Ecstasy later that year, but it failed to gain the same traction. In 1974, Billy Beck joined on keyboards/vocals, replacing Morrison, just as the band signed with Mercury Records. With newfound label support, the group released Skin Tight (1974), Fire (1974; with the title track "Fire" going to number 1), and Honey (1975; with another number 1 hit, "Love Rollercoaster"). All three albums topped, or nearly topped the Billboard 200. Following the recording of Honey in 1975, second guitarist/vocalist Clarence "Chet" Willis was added to the lineup, though he did not play on the group's next release Contradiction (1976). Robert "Kuumba" Jones joined on percussion in late 1977, after the release of Angel. At the same time, the group appeared as themselves in the film "Mr. Mean" and released a corresponding soundtrack album. In 1978, the group released its final album for Mercury, Jass-Ay-Lay-Dee, and were dropped from the label, as the group's last successful single had been "Who'd She Coo?" a number 1 R&B hit in August 1976. It was their only success in the United Kingdom, where it peaked at number 43 on the UK Singles Chart in July 1976.

=== 1979–1980s: Split ===
Early in 1979, Jones was replaced by percussionists Rubens Bassini and Azzedin Weston, with whom the band recorded Everybody Up (1979) for Arista Records. Later that year, keyboardist Billy Beck, drummer James "Diamond" Williams, and guitarist Chet Willis departed to form Shadow, which released three albums. Another collection, Orgasm, followed in 1993.

Following the 1979 split, the Ohio Players entered a period rife with lineup changes. Guitarist/frontman Bonner, bassist Jones, and horn players Middlebrooks and Pierce kept the group anchored for the 1981 releases Tenderness and Ouch!, but between 1983 and 1984, all members except for Bonner departed. In the same period, Beck returned as keyboardist and principal songwriter, and this new reconstituted lineup (featuring a new horn section) released Graduation in 1984.

=== 1988–2020s ===
In 1988, The Ohio Players released a "reunion" album, titled Back. It featured, for the first time in nearly a decade, Williams, Willis, and Robert "Kuumba" Jones. This core lineup hired sidemen and remained a stable touring act until Bonner retired from the group in 1997. Jones retired in 2019, dying in 2025, and Willis died in 2025 as well. As of 2026, Beck and Williams continue to perform with the Ohio Players.

== Personnel ==
=== Current ===
- James "Diamond" Williams – drums, percussion, lead and backing vocals (1972–1979, 1988–present)
- Billy Beck – keyboards, percussion, lead and backing vocals (1974–1979; 1983–present)
- Darwin Dortch – bass, vocals (1984–present)
- Ronald Nooks – keyboards (1988–2019, 2026–present)
- Rick Ward – guitar, vocals (2014–present)
- Christopher Bowman – guitar, vocals (2019–present)
- Kenneth Anderson – trumpet, vocals (2010s–present)
- Johnny Cotton – trombone, vocals (2010s–present)
- Mike Allenby – saxophone (2022–present)

=== Former members (1990s–2010s incomplete) ===
- Marshall "Rock" Jones – bass (1967–1970, 1971–1984; died 2016)
- Clarence "Satch" Satchell – saxophone, flute, percussion, backing and lead vocals (1967–1970, 1971–1980; died 1995)
- Ralph "Pee Wee" Middlebrooks – trumpet, saxophone, backing vocals (1967–1970, 1971–1984; died 1997)
- Leroy "Sugarfoot" Bonner – guitar, percussion, lead and backing vocals (1967–1970, 1971–1997; died 2013)
- Greg Webster – drums (1967–1970, 1971–1972; died 2022)
- Bobby Lee Fears – vocals (1967–1970; died 2007)
- Dutch Robinson – vocals, keyboards (1967–1970)
- Walter "Junie" Morrison – keyboards, vocals (1970–1974; died 2017)
- James Johnson – vocals, saxophone (1971–1972)
- Charles Dale Allen – vocals (1971)
- Marvin "Merv" Pierce – trumpet, flugelhorn, valve trombone, backing vocals (1972–1982)
- Bruce Napier – trumpet (1972–1974)
- Clarence "Chet" Willis – guitar, backing and lead vocals (1977–1979, 1988–2025 (touring 1975–77); his death)
- Robert "Kuumba" Jones – percussion (1977–1979, 1988–2019; died 2025)
- Rubens Bassini – percussion (1979–1980; died 1985)
- Azzedin Weston – percussion (1979–1980)
- Jimmy Sampson – drums (1979–1981)
- Mike McDonough – guitar (1979–1981)
- Wes Boatman – keyboards (1979–1981)
- Michael "Slyde" Jennings – trombone (1980–1983)
- Vincent Thomas – percussion (1980–1981)
- Floyd Bailey – drums (1981–1983)
- Shaun "Shauni Maque" Dedrick – guitar, vocals (1981–1983; died 2018)
- L. David Johnson – keyboards (1981–1982)
- Dean Simms – trumpet (1982–1984)
- Less Pell – trumpet, flugelhorn (1982–1984)
- John Woods – trumpet, flugelhorn (1982–1984)
- Mark "T–Bone" Casper – trombone (1983-1984)
- Bryan Clemmens – keyboards, vocals (1983–1984)
- Ronnie Cochran – drums (1983–1987)
- Rob Fetters – guitar (1983–1987)
- Ronnie "Diamond" Hoard - lead vocals, guitar (1983–1987)
- Glynn Sewell – bass (1984)
- Odeen Mays – keyboards, vocals (1995–2009, 2019–2026)
- Atlanta Horns – horn section (1990s)

- Sam Skelton (saxophone)

- Stutz Wimmer (saxophone)

- Eric Alexander (trombone)

- Mike Barry (trumpet)

- Uptown Horns – horn section (1990s)

- Crispin Cloe (saxophone)

- Arno Hecht (saxophone)

- Bob Funk (trombone)

- Larry Etkin (trumpet)

- Michael Turner – saxophone (?–2022)

== Ohio Untouchables (1959–67) personnel ==
- Marshall "Rock" Jones – bass (1959–1967; died 2016)
- Clarence "Satch" Satchell – saxophone, flute, backing and lead vocals (1959–1967; died 1995)
- Ralph "Pee Wee" Middlebrooks – trumpet, saxophone, backing vocals (1959–1967; died 1997)
- Robert Ward – guitar, lead vocals (1959–1964; died 2008)
- Cornelius Johnson – drums (1959–1964; died 2009)
- Greg Webster – drums (1964–1967; died 2022)
- Leroy "Sugarfoot" Bonner – guitar, percussion, lead vocals (1964–1967; died 2013)

== Samples by other artists ==
Their title track "Ecstasy" from the 1973 album Ecstasy was sampled by Jay-Z on "Brooklyn's Finest", featuring The Notorious B.I.G. from the 1996 album Reasonable Doubt.

== Discography ==
=== Studio albums ===
Year	Album	Peak chart positions			Certifications (sales threshold)	Record label
Year	Album	US Pop	US R&B	CAN	Certifications (sales threshold)	Record label
1969	Observations in Time	—	—	—		Capitol
1972	Pain	177	21	—		Westbound
1972	Pleasure	63	4	—		Westbound
1973	Ecstasy	70	19	—		Westbound
1974	Skin Tight	11	1	15	US: Platinum	Mercury
1974	Fire	1	1	17	US: Platinum	Mercury
1975	Honey	2	1	36	US: Platinum	Mercury
1976	Contradiction	12	1	26	US: Gold	Mercury
1977	Angel	41	9	58		Mercury
1977	Mr. Mean	68	11	65		Mercury
1978	Jass-Ay-Lay-Dee	69	15	—		Mercury
1979	Everybody Up	80	19	—		Arista
1981	Tenderness	165	49	—		Boardwalk
1981	Ouch!	—	52	—		Boardwalk
1984	Graduation	—	78	—		Century Vista
1988	Back	—	55	—		Track Record
"—" denotes a recording that did not chart or was not released in that territory.

=== Live albums ===
- Jam (1996, Mercury)
- Ol' School (1996, Essential Music)
- On Fire! (2023, Delta Music)

=== Compilation albums ===
Year	Album	Peak chart positions			Certifications (sales threshold)	Record label
Year	Album	US Pop	US R&B	CAN	Certifications (sales threshold)	Record label
1972	First Impressions	—	—	—		Trip
1974	The Ohio Players	—	32	—		Capitol
1974	Climax	102	24	—		Westbound
1975	Greatest Hits	92	22	—		Westbound
1975	Rattlesnake	61	8	—		Westbound
1976	Gold	31	10	28	US: Gold	Mercury
1977	The Best of the Early Years, Vol. 1	—	58	—		Westbound
1991	The Best of the Westbound Years	—	—	—		Westbound
1993	Orgasm: The Very Best of the Westbound Years	—	—	—		Westbound
1995	Funk on Fire: The Mercury Anthology	—	—	—		Mercury
1997	The Best of Ohio Players	—	—	—		PolyGram
2000	20th Century Masters – The Millennium Collection: The Best of Ohio Players	—	—	—		Mercury
2008	Gold [2-CD]	—	—	—		Island/Mercury
2014	Icon	—	—	—		Mercury
"—" denotes a recording that did not chart or was not released in that territory.

=== Singles ===
Year	Single	Peak chart positions				Album
Year	Single	US	US R&B	CAN	UK	Album
1967	"A Thing Called Love"	—	—	—	—	First Impressions
1968	"Trespassin'"	—	50	—	—	First Impressions
1968	"It's a Crying Shame"	—	—	—	—	First Impressions
1969	"Bad Bargain"	—	—	—	—	Observations in Time
1969	"Find Someone to Love"	—	—	—	—	Observations in Time
1971	"Pain (Part 1)"	64	35	91	—	Pain
1972	"Pleasure"	—	45	—	—	Pleasure
1972	"Varee Is Love"	—	—	—	—	Pleasure
1973	"Funky Worm"	15	1	50	—	Pleasure
1973	"Ecstasy"	31	12	—	—	Ecstasy
1973	"Sleep Talk"	—	—	—	—	Ecstasy
1974	"Jive Turkey (Part 1)"	47	6	71	—	Skin Tight
1974	"Skin Tight"	13	2	19	—	Skin Tight
1974	"Fire" ^{[A]}	1	1	5	—	Fire
1975	"I Want to Be Free"	44	6	51	—	Fire
1975	"Sweet Sticky Thing"	33	1	60	—	Honey
1975	"Love Rollercoaster"	1	1	2	—	Honey
1976	"Fopp"	30	9	43	—	Honey
1976	"Rattlesnake"	90	69	—	—	Rattlesnake
1976	"Who'd She Coo?"	18	1	63	43	Contradiction
1976	"Far East Mississippi"	—	26	—	—	Contradiction
1977	"Feel the Beat (Everybody Disco)"	61	31	—	—	Gold
1977	"Body Vibes"	—	19	—	—	Angel
1977	"O-H-I-O"	45	9	88	—	Angel
1977	"Merry Go Round"	—	77	—	—	Angel
1977	"Good Luck Charm (Part 1)"	101	51	—	—	Mr. Mean
1978	"Magic Trick"	—	93	—	—	Mr. Mean
1978	"Funk-O-Nots"	105	27	—	—	Jass-Ay-Lay-Dee
1978	"Time Slips Away"	—	53	—	—	Jass-Ay-Lay-Dee
1979	"Everybody Up"	—	33	—	—	Everybody Up
1981	"Try a Little Tenderness"	—	40	—	—	Tenderness
1981	"Skinny"	—	46	—	—	Tenderness
1981	"The Star of the Party"	—	58	—	—	Ouch!
1984	"Sight for Sore Eyes"	—	83	—	—	Graduation
1988	"Sweat"	—	50	—	—	Back
1988	"Let's Play (From Now On)"	—	33	—	—	Back
"—" denotes a recording that did not chart or was not released in that territory.

Notes

- ^{A} "Fire" also peaked at No. 10 on Billboard's Disco Action chart.

== See also ==
- List of artists who reached number one in the United States
- Unsung
