= Marshall "Rock" Jones =

- Birth name: Marshall Eugene Jones
- Also known as: Rock Jones
- Born: January 1, 1941; Dayton, Ohio, U.S.
- Died: May 27, 2016 (aged 75); Houston, Texas, U.S.
- Genres: Funk
- Occupation: Bass player
- Instrument: Bass guitar

Marshall Eugene "Rock" Jones (January 1, 1941 – May 27, 2016), professionally known as Rock Jones, was an American bass player. He is best known as a founding member and bassist of the funk, soul music and R&B band Ohio Players.

Marshall "Rock" Jones was born in Dayton, Ohio. He was with the band, when it was first formed in Dayton in 1959 as the Ohio Untouchables and initially included members Robert Ward (vocals/guitar), Marshall "Rock" Jones (bass), Clarence "Satch" Satchell (saxophone/guitar), Cornelius Johnson (drums), and Ralph "Pee Wee" Middlebrooks (trumpet/trombone). They were best known at the time as a backing group for The Falcons. Jones was known for wearing a turban on stage. With the Ohio Players he had No. 1 hits "Fire" (1974) and "Love Rollercoaster" (1975) on the Billboard Hot 100. He stayed with the band until 1984.

He was the last surviving member from the Ohio Untouchables line-up, and died of cancer in Houston, Texas, at age 75.
