= Leroy "Sugarfoot" Bonner =

Background information
- Born: Leroy Roosevelt Bonner; March 14, 1943; Hamilton, Ohio, U.S.
- Died: January 26, 2013 (aged 69) Trotwood, Ohio
- Genres: Funk
- Occupations: Musician, producer
- Instrument: Electric guitar

Leroy Roosevelt "Sugarfoot" Bonner (March 14, 1943 – January 26, 2013) was a musician, vocalist, and producer.

Born in Hamilton, Ohio, about 20 miles (32 km) north of Cincinnati in 1943, Bonner grew up poor, the oldest of 14 children. He ran away from home at 14, and eventually wound up in Dayton, where he connected with the musicians who would form the Ohio Players. The band's lineup changed over the years, but its instrumentation and sound remained basically the same: a solid, driving groove provided by guitar, keyboards, bass and drums, punctuated by staccato blasts from a horn section.

Assisted by Roger Troutman and his Zapp brethren, Sugarfoot went solo in 1985 with Sugar Kiss—the same year Zapp released The New Zapp IV U (featuring "Computer Love"), while Shirley Murdock was on the verge of scoring with the Troutman-produced "As We Lay".

Vocals were a secondary consideration. "We were players," Bonner told The Dayton Daily News in 2003. "We weren't trying to be lead singers." The core members of the band did not originally sing, he explained, but "we got so tired of having singers leave us that we decided we'd just do the singing ourselves. I used to play with my back to the audience in the old days,” he added. "I didn't want to see them because they were distracting. Then the first time I turned around and opened my mouth, we had a hit record with Skin Tight. That's amazing to me."

He died on January 26, 2013, from cancer in his hometown of Trotwood.

== Discography ==
=== Solo albums ===
- Sugar Kiss (1985)
