= 1976 in music =

A list of notable events in music that took place in the year 1976.

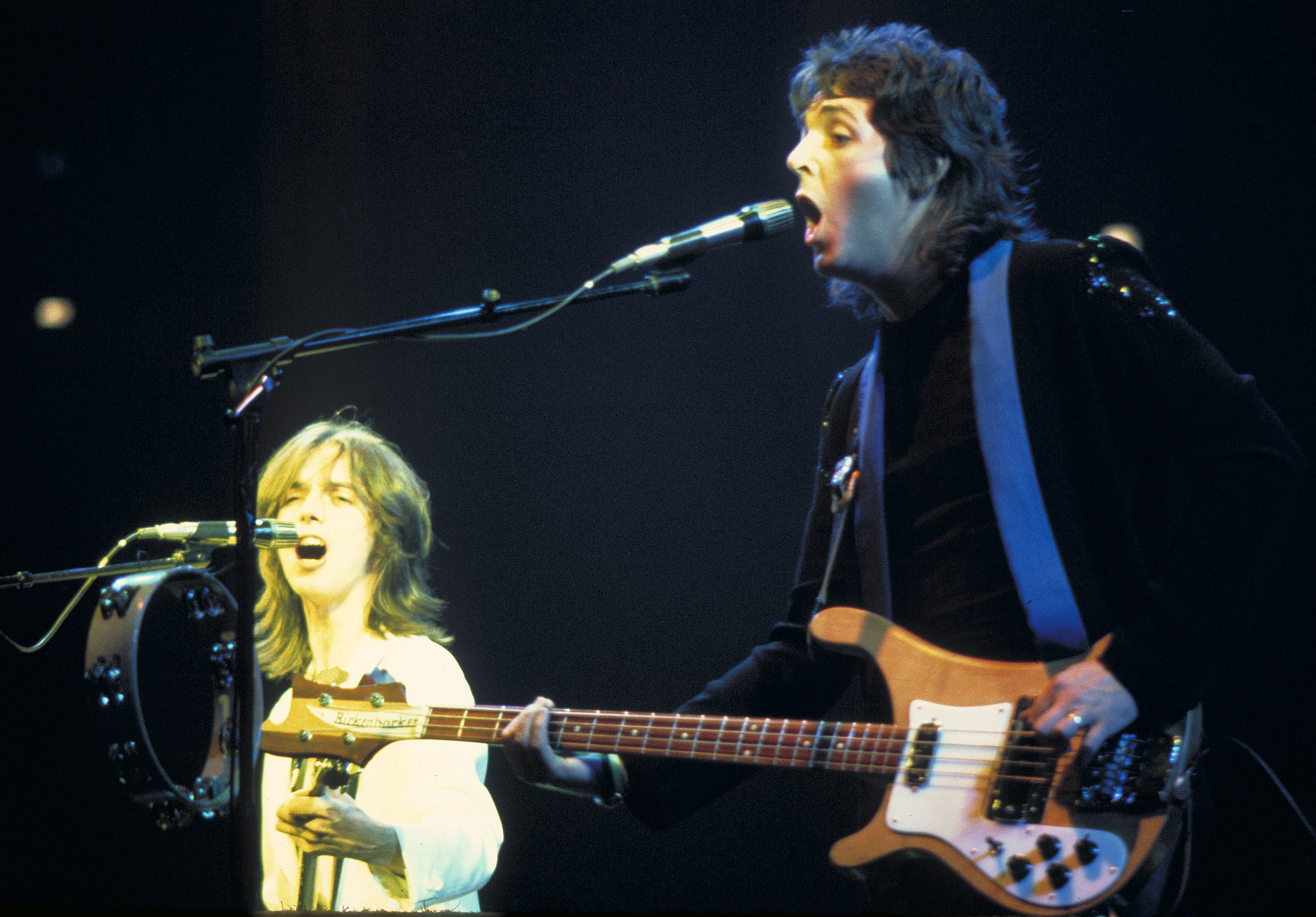
Jimmy McCulloch (left) and Paul McCartney (right) of Wings in 1976

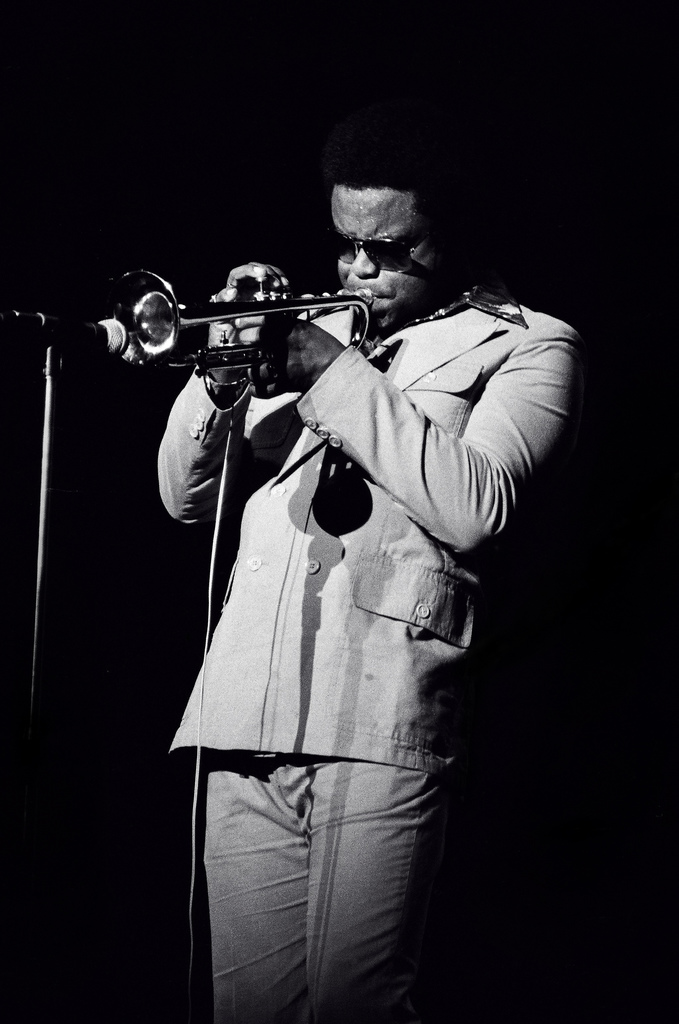
Freddie Hubbard in 1976

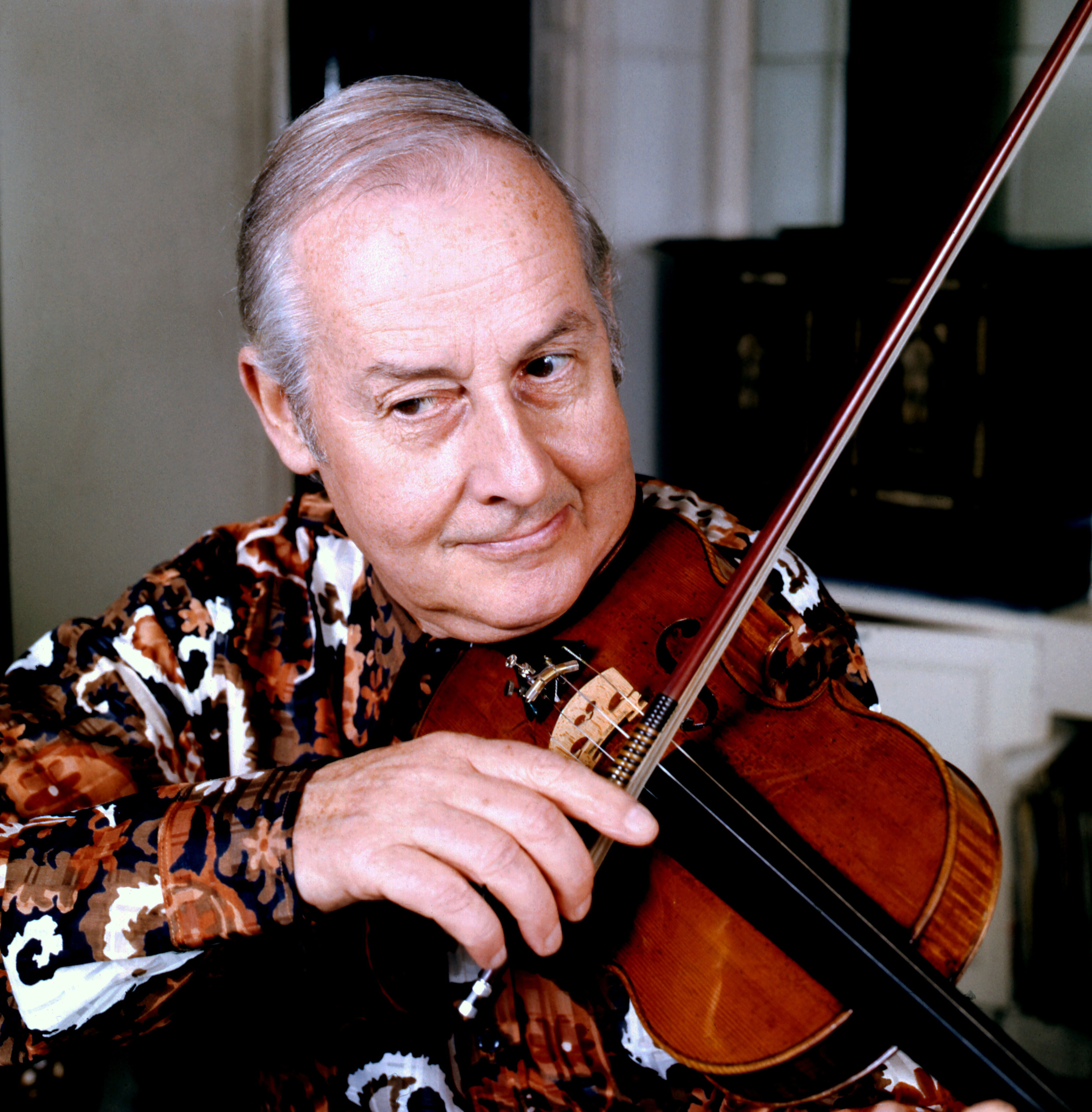
Stephane Grappelli in 1976

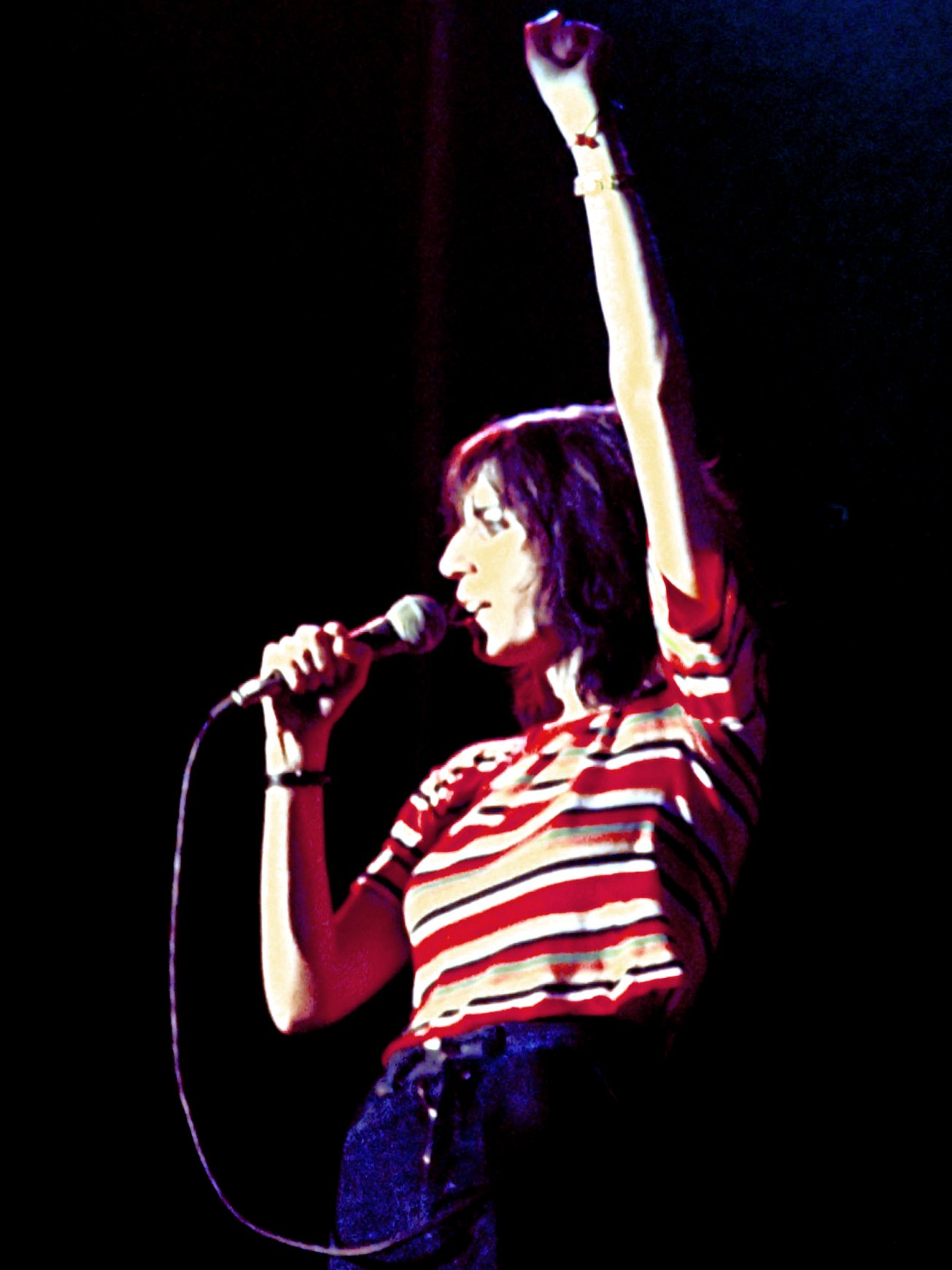
Patti Smith in 1976

== Specific locations ==
- 1976 in British music
- 1976 in Japanese music
- 1976 in Norwegian music

== Specific genres ==
- 1976 in country music
- 1976 in heavy metal music
- 1976 in jazz

== Events ==
=== January–February ===
- January 5 – Former Beatles road manager Mal Evans is shot dead by Los Angeles police after refusing to drop what police only later determine is an air rifle.
- January 7 – Kenneth Moss, a former record company executive, is sentenced to 120 days in the Los Angeles County Jail and four years probation for involuntary manslaughter in the 1974 drug-induced death of Average White Band drummer Robbie McIntosh.
- January 13 – A trial begins for seven Brunswick Records and Dakar Records employees. The record company employees are charged with stealing more than $184,000 in royalties from artists.
- January 15 – Peter Frampton releases his live album Frampton Comes Alive!.
- January 19 – Concert promoter Bill Sargent makes an offer of $30 million to the Beatles if they will reunite for a concert.
- February 15 – Bette Midler bails seven members of her entourage out of jail after they are arrested on charges of cocaine and marijuana possession.
- February 19 – Former Tower of Power lead singer Rick Stevens is arrested and charged with the drug-related murders of three men in San Jose, California.
- February 20 – Kiss have their footprints added to the sidewalk outside Hollywood's Grauman's Chinese Theatre.
- February 24 – Released one week before, Eagles' Their Greatest Hits (1971–1975) compilation becomes the first album certified platinum by the RIAA. The new platinum certification represents sales of at least 1 million copies for albums and 2 million copies for singles. Globally, it will become probably the second best-selling album of all time.
- February 28 – The 18th Annual Grammy Awards are presented in Los Angeles, hosted by Andy Williams. Paul Simon's Still Crazy After All These Years wins Album of the Year, Captain & Tennille's "Love Will Keep Us Together" wins Record of the Year and Judy Collins' version of "Send in the Clowns" wins Song of the Year. Natalie Cole wins Best New Artist.

=== March–April ===
- March 4 – ABBA arrive at Sydney airport for a promotional tour in Australia.
- March 6 – EMI Records reissues all 22 previously released British Beatles singles, plus a new single of the classic "Yesterday". All 23 singles hit the UK charts at the same time.
- March 7 – A wax likeness of Elton John is put on display in London's Madame Tussaud's Wax Museum.
- March 9 – The Who's Keith Moon collapses onstage ten minutes into a performance at the Boston Garden.
- March 15 – Members of The Plastic People of the Universe are arrested in communist Czechoslovakia. They were sentenced from 8 to 18 months in jail.
- March 20 – Alice Cooper marries Sheryl Goddard in an Acapulco restaurant.
- March 25 – Jackson Browne's wife Phyllis commits suicide.
- March 26 – In Paris, France, Wings guitarist Jimmy McCulloch breaks one of his fingers when he slips in his hotel bathroom following the final performance on the band's European tour. The injury ended up delaying the band's United States tour by three weeks.
- April 3 – British pop group Brotherhood of Man win the 21st Eurovision Song Contest in The Hague, Netherlands, with the song "Save Your Kisses For Me". It goes on to be the biggest selling Eurovision winner ever.
- April 14 – Stevie Wonder announces that he has signed a "$13 million-plus" contract with Motown Records.
- April 23 – The Ramones release their debut studio album, Ramones.
- April 24 – Saturday Night Live producer Lorne Michaels makes a semi-serious on-air offer to pay the Beatles $3000 to reunite live on the show. In a 1980 interview, John Lennon stated that he and Paul McCartney happened to be watching the show together at Lennon's apartment in New York and considered walking down to the SNL studio "for a gag" but were "too tired". On May 22, Michaels raises his offer from $3,000 to $3,200.
- April 28 – The Rolling Stones open their European tour in Frankfurt, Germany.
- April 29 – When his tour stops in Memphis, Tennessee, Bruce Springsteen jumps the wall at Elvis Presley's mansion, "Graceland", in an attempt to see his idol. Security guards stop Springsteen and escort him off the grounds.

=== May–June ===
- May 1 – The Alan Parsons Project release their debut studio album, Tales of Mystery and Imagination.
- May 3
  - Paul McCartney and Wings start their Wings over America Tour in Fort Worth, Texas. This is the first time McCartney has performed in the US since The Beatles' last concert in 1966 at Candlestick Park.
  - Paul Simon puts together a benefit show at Madison Square Garden to raise money for the New York Public Library. Phoebe Snow, Jimmy Cliff and the Brecker Brothers also perform. The concert brings in over $30,000 for the Library.
- May 19
  - Rolling Stones guitarist Keith Richards is involved in a car accident northwest of London. Cocaine is found in his wrecked car. Richards is given a court date of January 12, 1977.
  - Rumour spread by German press: ABBA members killed in plane crash, only Anni-Frid survived.
- May 25 – Bob Dylan's Rolling Thunder Revue tour ends.
- June – Former Spring Canyon keyboardist Mark Cook joins Daniel Amos.
- June 6 – Keith Richards and Anita Pallenberg suffer tragedy when their 10-week-old son Tara dies of respiratory failure.
- June 10 – Alice Cooper collapses and is rushed to UCLA Hospital in Los Angeles, three weeks before the Goes To Hell tour would begin. The tour is cancelled.
- June 17 – the first Macroom Mountain Dew Festival is held, the first ever rock festival to take place in Ireland.
- June 18 – ABBA perform "Dancing Queen" for the first time on Swedish television in Stockholm on the eve of the wedding of King Carl XVI Gustaf to Silvia Sommerlath.
- June 25 – Uriah Heep performs its last show with David Byron as lead singer in Bilbao, Spain. Byron is sacked shortly afterward.

=== July–August ===
- July 2
  - Composer Benjamin Britten accepts a life peerage, only a few months before his death.
  - Brian Wilson performs on stage with The Beach Boys for the first time in three years at a Day on the Green concert in Oakland, California.
- July 4 – Many outdoor festivals and shows are held all over the United States as the country celebrates its bicentennial. Elton John performs for 62,000 at Shaffer Stadium in Foxboro, Massachusetts, while The Eagles and Fleetwood Mac play for 36,000 at Tampa Stadium, Lynyrd Skynyrd and ZZ Top draw 35,000 at Memphis Memorial Stadium and Elvis Presley performs for 11,974 at the Mabee Center in Tulsa, Oklahoma.
- July 7 – 50,000 fans brave the rain in New York to attend a free Jefferson Starship concert in Central Park.
- July 27 – Tina Turner files for divorce from husband Ike.
- August 5 – Eric Clapton provokes an uproar over comments he makes on stage at a Birmingham concert, voicing his opposition to immigration using multiple racial slurs while exhorting the audience to support Enoch Powell and to "keep Britain white".
- August 11 – Keith Moon is rushed to hospital for the second time in five months, collapsing after trashing his Miami hotel room.
- August 13 – The official ABBA logo with the reversed 'B' is adopted.
- August 16 – Cliff Richard becomes one of the first Western artists ever to perform in the Soviet Union when he gives a concert in Leningrad.
- August 21 – An estimated 120,000 fans pack Knebworth House to see The Rolling Stones. Todd Rundgren, Lynyrd Skynyrd and 10cc also perform.
- August 25 – Boston release their eponymous debut studio album, Boston.
- August 31 – A U.S. district court decision rules that George Harrison had "subconsciously" copied The Chiffons' hit "He's So Fine" when he wrote the song "My Sweet Lord".

=== September–October ===
- September 1 – Ode Records president Lou Adler is kidnapped at his Malibu home and released eight hours later after a $25,000 ransom is paid. Two suspects are soon arrested.
- September 3 – Rory Gallagher joins the short list of Western popular musicians to perform behind the Iron Curtain with a show in Warsaw, Poland.
- September 8 – In a candid interview appearing in the October 7 edition of Rolling Stone published today, Elton John publicly discloses his bisexuality for the first time.
- September 14 – The one-hour Bob Dylan concert special Hard Rain airs on NBC, coinciding with the release of the live album of the same name.
- September 18
  - Queen performs a massive free concert at London's Hyde Park for over 150,000 people.
  - The second annual Rock Music Awards air on CBS. Peter Frampton wins Rock Personality of the Year, while Fleetwood Mac wins for Best Group and Best Album.
- September 20 – Siouxsie Sioux and Steven Severin form the band Siouxsie and the Banshees in London and make their first live performance at the 100 Club.
- September 25 – Bono, The Edge, Adam Clayton and Larry Mullen Jr. form a band called Feedback in Dublin. The band would later be renamed U2.
- October 2 – Joe Cocker performs a duet of "Feelin' Alright" with himself (as portrayed by John Belushi) on Saturday Night Live.
- October 8 – English punk rock group the Sex Pistols sign a contract with EMI Records.
- October 11 – Irish singer Joe Dolan is banned for life by Aer Lingus after an air rage incident en route to Corfu from Dublin.
- October 20 – The Led Zeppelin concert film The Song Remains the Same premieres at Cinema I in New York.
- October 22 - The Damned releases their debut single “New Rose”, considered to be the first release from a British punk group.
- October 30 – The 5th OTI Festival, held at the Teatro Juan Ruiz de Alarcón of the Centro de Convenciones in Acapulco, Mexico, is won by the song "Canta cigarra", written and performed by María Ostiz representing Spain.
- October 31 – George Clinton and Parliament Funkadelic begin "The P-Funk/Rubber Band Earth Tour" in Houston, a national live series highlighting one of the biggest and revolutionary stage shows in the history of the music industry (the rock group Kiss would be the other group to do a similar act), relying on elaborate costumes, special lighting and effects, and extremely large props including "the Mothership", which would arrive and land on stage, all of what this band is generally known for. This live set would vary in length (on average of 3 to 5 hours long) and at high volume.

=== November–December ===
- November 18 – Former Tower of Power lead singer Rick Stevens and another person are found guilty on two counts of murder.
- November 23
  - Thin Lizzy are forced to cancel their U.S. tour when guitarist Brian Robertson injures his hand in a bar fight.
  - Jerry Lee Lewis is arrested after showing up drunk outside Graceland at 3 a.m., waving a pistol and loudly demanding to see Elvis Presley. Presley has declined his request.
- November 25 – The Band gives its last public performance; Martin Scorsese is on hand to film it.
- November 26 – The Sex Pistols' debut single "Anarchy in the U.K." is released by EMI.
- December 1 – The Sex Pistols appear on Thames Television's Today show as a last-minute replacement for Queen. The group causes a national outcry after swearing on the show.
- December 2 – The Bee Gees perform at Madison Square Garden and donate the proceeds to the Police Athletic League in New York. In January 1979, they will receive the Police Athletic League's "Superstars of the Year" award.
- December 3
  - A Pink Floyd album cover shoot in South London goes awry when a large inflatable pig balloon being used for the shoot breaks free of its moorings and drifts out of sight.
  - Attempted assassination of Bob Marley (with his manager Don Taylor and others) in a shooting at his home in Kingston, Jamaica.
- December 8
  - The Carpenters air their "Very First Television Special" on ABC.
  - The Eagles release Hotel California. Globally, it will become the third best-selling album of all time, behind the same band's February-released Greatest Hits compilation.
- December 12 – Ace Frehley is shocked on stage during a Kiss concert in Lakeland, Florida after touching an ungrounded metal railing. The incident inspires the song "Shock Me".
- December 31 – The fifth annual New Year's Rockin' Eve special airs on ABC, with performances by Donna Summer, Bachman-Turner Overdrive, The Four Seasons, and KC and the Sunshine Band.

=== Also in 1976 ===
- The last practitioner of the rekuhkara form of throat-singing dies, in Hokkaido, Japan.
- Tenor Franco Corelli retires from the stage at the age of 55.
- Cheryl Byron performs rapso in calypso tents for the first time, beginning the popularization of rapso.
- Peter Brown's solo career begins.
- Peter Tosh's solo career begins.
- Bunny Wailer's solo career begins.
- Leif Garrett's solo career begins.
- .38 Special's musical career begins.
- Y&T (Yesterday & Today)'s musical career begins.
- Sergio Franchi becomes TV spokesman for Chrysler Corporation's Plymouth "Volare" and media spokesman for Hills Brothers coffee.
- Steve Martin signs a contract with Warner Bros.
- Eddie Money signs a contract with CBS.
- "Ten Percent", by Double Exposure, becomes the first 12-inch single commercially available to the public (as opposed to DJ-only promotional copies).
- The Chinese Music Society of North America is founded.
- Gabin Dabiré embarks on a tour of Italy.

== Bands formed ==
- See Musical groups established in 1976

== Bands reformed ==
- The Pirates
- Jan & Dean

== Bands disbanded ==
- See Musical groups disestablished in 1976

== Albums released ==
=== January ===
Day	Album	Artist	Notes
1	Have Moicy!	Michael Hurley, The Unholy Modal Rounders and Jeffrey Frederick & The Clamtones	-
2	Let the Music Play	Barry White	-
2	Look into the Future	Journey	-
5	Desire	Bob Dylan	-
5	Lovin' and Learnin'	Tanya Tucker	-
8	Elvis: A Legendary Performer Volume 2	Elvis Presley	Compilation
8	Songs for the New Depression	Bette Midler	-
9	M.U. – The Best of Jethro Tull	Jethro Tull	Compilation
12	Wanted! The Outlaws	Waylon Jennings, Willie Nelson, Jessi Colter & Tompall Glaser	Compilation
13	Thoroughbred	Carole King	-
15	Frampton Comes Alive!	Peter Frampton	Live; US release
16	Give Us a Wink	Sweet	-
16	Sunburst Finish	Be-Bop Deluxe	-
19	Coney Island Baby	Lou Reed	-
20	Havana Daydreamin'	Jimmy Buffett	-
23	Station to Station	David Bowie	-
24	How Dare You!	10cc	-
30	Futuristic Dragon	T.Rex	-
30	Run with the Pack	Bad Company	-
30	Timeless Flight	Steve Harley & Cockney Rebel	-
-	Hot	James Brown	-
-	Aftertones	Janis Ian	-
-	Born to Die	Grand Funk Railroad	-
-	Chronicle, Vol. 1	Creedence Clearwater Revival	Compilation
-	From Every Stage	Joan Baez	Live
-	If the Shoe Fits	Pure Prairie League	-
-	Inner Worlds	Mahavishnu Orchestra	-
-	Jessi	Jessi Colter	-
-	Native Sons	Loggins and Messina	-
-	Release	Henry Gross	-
-	Sandman	Harry Nilsson	-
-	Second Childhood	Phoebe Snow	-
-	Starland Vocal Band	Starland Vocal Band	Debut
-	To the Hilt	Golden Earring	-

=== February ===
Day	Album	Artist	Notes
2	Gimme Back My Bullets	Lynyrd Skynyrd	-
7	Jesse Come Home	James Gang	-
10	Diana Ross	Diana Ross	-
10	Smokey's Family Robinson	Smokey Robinson	-
13	Give Us a Wink	The Sweet	US Release
13	A Trick of the Tail	Genesis	
13	Shamal	Gong	-
15	Reflections	Jerry Garcia	-
16	It's All in the Movies	Merle Haggard	-
17	Their Greatest Hits (1971–1975)	Eagles	Compilation
18	Silk Degrees	Boz Scaggs	-
27	Song of Joy	Captain & Tennille	-
29	Come On Over	Olivia Newton-John	
-	Classical Barbra	Barbra Streisand	-
-	Full of Fire	Al Green	-
-	Smile	Laura Nyro	-
-	The Sound in Your Mind	Willie Nelson	-
-	Starcastle	Starcastle	Debut
-	The Third Reich 'n Roll	The Residents	-

=== March ===
Day	Album	Artist	Notes
1	Captured Live!	Johnny Winter	Live
3	Kingfish	Kingfish	
5	A Love Trilogy	Donna Summer	-
5	Nobody's Fools	Slade	-
10	Wings of Love	The Temptations	-
12	Blue for You	Status Quo	-
12	Locked In	Wishbone Ash	-
15	Destroyer	Kiss	-
16	I Want You	Marvin Gaye	-
19	Breezin'	George Benson	-
19	Takin' It to the Streets	The Doobie Brothers	-
21	Look Out For #1	The Brothers Johnson	Debut
22	The Sun Sessions	Elvis Presley	Recorded 1954–'55
24	2112	Rush	
25	Close Enough for Rock 'n' Roll	Nazareth	-
26	Moonmadness	Camel	
26	Amigos	Santana	-
26	Jailbreak	Thin Lizzy	-
26	Sad Wings of Destiny	Judas Priest	-
26	Wings at the Speed of Sound	Wings	
29	Saddle Tramp	Charlie Daniels	-
31	Presence	Led Zeppelin	
-	American Pastime	Three Dog Night	-
-	Bright Size Life	Pat Metheny	Debut
-	Contradiction	Ohio Players	-
-	Home Is Where the Heart Is	David Cassidy	-
-	Just for the Record	Ray Stevens	-
-	Love & Understanding	Kool & The Gang	-
-	Mackintosh & T.J.	Waylon Jennings & Willie Nelson	Soundtrack
-	Robin Trower Live	Robin Trower	Live
-	You Can't Argue with a Sick Mind	Joe Walsh	Live

=== April ===
Day	Album	Artist	Notes
1	The Longhorn Jamboree Presents: Willie Nelson & His Friends	Willie Nelson	-
9	Hideaway	America	-
9	Roadhawks	Hawkwind	Compilation
12	Live Bullet	Bob Seger & The Silver Bullet Band	Live
15	Steppin' Out	Neil Sedaka	-
16	Still Life	Van der Graaf Generator	-
16	Moondawn	Klaus Schulze	-
19	Welcome Back	John Sebastian	-
22	Blow Your Face Out	The J. Geils Band	Live
23	Black and Blue	The Rolling Stones	-
23	Blind Dog at St.Dunstans	Caravan	-
23	Garvey's Ghost	Burning Spear	-
23	Greatest Stories Live	Harry Chapin	Live
23	If I Were Brittania I'd Waive the Rules	Budgie	-
23	Interview	Gentle Giant	-
23	Ramones	Ramones	-
23	Stingray	Joe Cocker	-
23	Too Old to Rock 'n' Roll: Too Young to Die!	Jethro Tull	-
25	Watashi no Koe ga Kikoemasuka	Miyuki Nakajima	-
29	Krokus	Krokus	Debut
30	Here and There	Elton John	Live
30	Rastaman Vibration	Bob Marley & The Wailers	-
-	After Hours	Little River Band	-
-	Jaco Pastorius	Jaco Pastorius	
-	The Lucky Golden Stripes and Starpose	Wigwam	
-	At the Sound of the Bell	Pavlov's Dog	-
-	Happy to Be...	Demis Roussos	-
-	Let Your Love Flow	The Bellamy Brothers	-
-	A Little Bit More	Dr. Hook & the Medicine Show	-
-	No Earthly Connection	Rick Wakeman	-
-	Pat Travers	Pat Travers	-
-	Wedding Album	Leon and Mary Russell	-
-	Young and Rich	The Tubes	-
-	Howlin' Wind	Graham Parker and the Rumour	-

=== May ===
Day	Album	Artist	Notes
3	Max Webster	Max Webster	Debut
3	Rocks	Aerosmith	-
6	1st Round	Pino Presti	-
7	Illegal Stills	Stephen Stills	-
7	I'm Nearly Famous	Cliff Richard	-
10	Faithful	Todd Rundgren	-
12	Everybody Loves the Sunshine	Roy Ayers	-
14	High Voltage	AC/DC	International version
15	Fly Like an Eagle	Steve Miller Band	-
16	From Elvis Presley Boulevard, Memphis, Tennessee	Elvis Presley	-
17	Rising	Rainbow	-
17	The Runaways	The Runaways	-
18	Warren Zevon	Warren Zevon	-
19	Turnstiles	Billy Joel	-
21	Agents of Fortune	Blue Öyster Cult	-
21	Changesonebowie	David Bowie	Compilation
21	High and Mighty	Uriah Heep	-
21	No Heavy Petting	UFO	-
26	Rose of Cimarron	Poco	-
28	Long Hard Ride	The Marshall Tucker Band	-
29	Harvest for the World	The Isley Brothers	-
31	The Royal Scam	Steely Dan	-
-	Arbour Zena	Keith Jarrett	-
-	Balls of Fire	Black Oak Arkansas	-
-	Cardiff Rose	Roger McGuinn	-
-	Nine on a Ten Scale	Sammy Hagar	-
-	Sky High!	Tavares	-
-	Slow Down World	Donovan	-
-	T Shirt	Loudon Wainwright III	-
-	Wired	Jeff Beck	-

=== June ===
Day	Album	Artist	Notes
1	Sparkle	Aretha Franklin	Soundtrack
5	Another Passenger	Carly Simon	-
7	All Things in Time	Lou Rawls	-
7	Rock 'n' Roll Music	The Beatles	Compilation
7	Shouting and Pointing	Mott	-
7	Spitfire	Jefferson Starship	-
10	In the Pocket	James Taylor	-
11	Beautiful Noise	Neil Diamond	-
11	A Kind of Hush	Carpenters	
14	Chicago X	Chicago	-
15	Anthology	The Jackson 5	Compilation
15	Helluva Band	Angel	-
15	Hot on the Tracks	Commodores	-
17	Chameleon	LaBelle	-
18	A Night on the Town	Rod Stewart	-
18	Unorthodox Behaviour	Brand X	-
21	Starz	Starz	-
25	Alice Cooper Goes to Hell	Alice Cooper	-
25	Softs	Soft Machine	-
25	Whistling Down the Wire	Crosby & Nash	-
26	Steal Your Face	Grateful Dead	Live
26	Take the Heat off Me	Boney M	-
26	Two for the Show	Trooper	-
-	Airborne	The Flying Burrito Brothers	-
-	Are You Ready for the Country	Waylon Jennings	-
-	Farther Along	Spirit	-
-	La Düsseldorf	La Düsseldorf	Debut
-	Legalize It	Peter Tosh	Debut
-	Mark Twang	John Hartford	-
-	R.E.O.	REO Speedwagon	-
-	Right Back Where We Started From	Maxine Nightingale	-
-	Shake Some Action	Flamin' Groovies	-
-	Summertime Dream	Gordon Lightfoot	-
-	...That's the Way It Is	Harry Nilsson	-
-	Wild Cherry	Wild Cherry	-
-	Yes We Have No Mañanas (So Get Your Mañanas Today)	Kevin Ayers	-

=== July ===
Day	Album	Artist	Notes
1	Seychelles	Masayoshi Takanaka	Debut
5	15 Big Ones	The Beach Boys	-
5	My Love Affair with Trains	Merle Haggard	-
8	Music, Music	Helen Reddy	-
9	Olias of Sunhillow	Jon Anderson	
16	Viva!	Roxy Music	Live
20	The Clones of Dr. Funkenstein	Parliament	-
20	I've Got You	Gloria Gaynor	-
21	The Originals	Kiss	Compilation
22	Trick Bag	The Meters	-
-	Best of BTO (So Far)	Bachman–Turner Overdrive	Compilation
-	Child in Time	Ian Gillan Band	-
-	Diamond in the Rough	Jessi Colter	-
-	More Than Ever	Blood, Sweat & Tears	-
-	Sincerely	Dwight Twilley Band	-
-	Surreal Thing	Kris Kristofferson	-

=== August ===
Day	Album	Artist	Notes
2	Good Singin', Good Playin'	Grand Funk Railroad	-
6	All I Can Do	Dolly Parton	-
6	Stretchin' Out in Bootsy's Rubber Band	Bootsy's Rubber Band	-
8	My Name Is Jermaine	Jermaine Jackson	-
9	Hasten Down the Wind	Linda Ronstadt	-
9	Spirit	John Denver	-
13	This Is Niecy	Deniece Williams	
15	Secrets	Herbie Hancock	-
18	Man in the Hills	Burning Spear	-
19	Barefoot Ballet	John Klemmer	-
19	Coming Out	The Manhattan Transfer	-
25	Boston	Boston	-
27	Astounding Sounds, Amazing Music	Hawkwind	-
27	Joan Armatrading	Joan Armatrading	-
27	No Reason to Cry	Eric Clapton	-
27	The Roaring Silence	Manfred Mann's Earth Band	-
-	Amigo	Arlo Guthrie	-
-	Honor Among Thieves	Artful Dodger	-
-	The Modern Lovers	The Modern Lovers	-
-	Second Thoughts	Split Enz	-
-	Super Ape	The Upsetters	-
-	This One's for You	Barry Manilow	-
-	Waking and Dreaming	Orleans	-
-	What a Lemon	Gasolin'	-

=== September ===
Day	Album	Artist	Notes
6	Here's Some Love	Tanya Tucker	-
8	Bigger Than Both of Us	Hall & Oates	-
8	Blackheart Man	Bunny Wailer	-
10	Let's Stick Together	Bryan Ferry	-
13	Car Wash: Original Motion Picture Soundtrack	Rose Royce	Soundtrack
13	Children of the World	Bee Gees	-
13	Hard Rain	Bob Dylan	Live
13	One More from the Road	Lynyrd Skynyrd	Live
14	The Power of Music	The Miracles	-
17	Ringo's Rotogravure	Ringo Starr	-
20	Dirty Deeds Done Dirt Cheap	AC/DC	Australia
20	Long May You Run	The Stills-Young Band	Stephen Stills and Neil Young
21	Small Change	Tom Waits	-
21	Tales of Kidd Funkadelic	Funkadelic	-
24	L	Steve Hillage	-
24	Rocket Cottage	Steeleye Span	-
24	Albedo 0.39	Vangelis	
28	Songs in the Key of Life	Stevie Wonder	-
28	Spirit	Earth, Wind & Fire	-
29	All the World's a Stage	Rush	Live
29	El jardín de los presentes	Invisible	-
-	Dedication	Bay City Rollers	-
-	Free-for-All	Ted Nugent	-
-	Jump on It	Montrose	-
-	Keeping in Touch	Anne Murray	-
-	Mahoney's Last Stand	Ron Wood and Ronnie Lane	-
-	Musical Massage	Leon Ware	-
-	Private Eyes	Tommy Bolin	-
-	Stupidity	Dr. Feelgood	Live
-	Troubadour	JJ Cale	-
-	The Troublemaker	Willie Nelson	-
-	The Whole World's Goin' Crazy	April Wine	-

=== October ===
Day	Album	Artist	Notes
1	Chestnut Street Incident	Johnny Cougar	-
1	Crystal Ball	Styx	-
1	Octoberon	Barclay James Harvest	-
1	Part 3	KC and the Sunshine Band	-
3	Flow Motion	Can	-
8	Technical Ecstasy	Black Sabbath	US
8	School Days	Stanley Clarke	-
11	Arrival	ABBA	-
11	Four Seasons of Love	Donna Summer	-
11	Hoppkorv	Hot Tuna	-
13	Gold	Ohio Players	Compilation + 2 new tracks
13	Triumph	Triumph	-
15	Johnny the Fox	Thin Lizzy	-
15	A New World Record	Electric Light Orchestra	US
21	Leftoverture	Kansas	-
22	Blue Moves	Elton John	-
22	Heat Treatment	Graham Parker	-
22	Night Moves	Bob Seger	-
22	Radio Ethiopia	Patti Smith Group	-
22	The Song Remains the Same	Led Zeppelin	Live 1973
22	Year of the Cat	Al Stewart	UK
23	On the Road to Kingdom Come	Harry Chapin	-
24	Calling Card	Rory Gallagher	-
25	All This and World War II	Various Artists	Soundtrack
25	Land of the Midnight Sun	Al Di Meola	-
29	Best of The Doobies	The Doobie Brothers	Compilation
29	Brass Construction II	Brass Construction	-
29	Endless Flight	Leo Sayer	-
29	Hardcore Jollies	Funkadelic	-
29	Zoot Allures	Frank Zappa	-
-	Big Beat	Sparks	-
-	Roller	Goblin	
-	Burton Cummings	Burton Cummings	-
-	Deep Cuts	Strawbs	-
-	Don't Stop Believin'	Olivia Newton-John	-
-	Gold Plated	Climax Blues Band	-
-	I'd Rather Believe in You	Cher	-
-	It Looks Like Snow	Phoebe Snow	-
-	Long Misty Days	Robin Trower	-
-	My Spanish Heart	Chick Corea	-
-	New England	Wishbone Ash	-
-	Open Sesame	Kool & the Gang	-
-	Some People Can Do What They Like	Robert Palmer	-
-	World Record	Van der Graaf Generator	-

=== November ===
Day	Album	Artist	Notes
1	Greatest Hits	James Taylor	Compilation
1	Love Is All Around	Eric Burdon & War	-
2	Water Babies	Miles Davis	Recorded 1967–'68
3	Efter endnu en dag	Gasolin'	-
4	Imaginary Voyage	Jean-Luc Ponty	-
5	High Lonesome	Charlie Daniels	-
5	The Jacksons	The Jacksons	-
5	Love's a Prima Donna	Steve Harley & Cockney Rebel	-
6	Naked & Warm	Bill Withers	-
8	The Best of George Harrison	George Harrison	Compilation
8	Gulf Winds	Joan Baez	-
9	Tom Petty and the Heartbreakers	Tom Petty and the Heartbreakers	-
10	The Pretender	Jackson Browne	-
11	Rock and Roll Over	Kiss	-
18	Have a Good Time	Al Green	-
18	Night Shift	Foghat	-
19	Thirty Three & 1/3	George Harrison	-
21	Hejira	Joni Mitchell	-
22	The Roots of My Raising	Merle Haggard	-
22	Teenage Depression	Eddie and the Hot Rods	Debut
22	Virgin Killer	Scorpions	-
25	Wipe the Windows, Check the Oil, Dollar Gas	The Allman Brothers Band	Live
29	Tejas	ZZ Top	-
30	Is This Whatcha Wont?	Barry White	-
-	Made in Europe	Deep Purple	Live
-	Dance	Pure Prairie League	-
-	Getting It in the Street	David Cassidy	-
-	Hymns/Spheres	Keith Jarrett	-
-	Play 'n' the Game	Nazareth	-
-	Regeneration	Roy Orbison	-
-	Rock and Roll Heart	Lou Reed	-
-	A Star Is Born	Barbra Streisand	Soundtrack

=== December ===
Day	Album	Artist	Notes
2	Still Stills: The Best of Stephen Stills	Stephen Stills	Compilation
8	Hotel California	Eagles	-
10	A Day at the Races	Queen	-
10	Wings over America	Wings	Live
17	Red River Valley	Slim Whitman	-
17	Wind & Wuthering	Genesis	-
28	Disco Inferno	The Trammps	-
28	Luxury Liner	Emmylou Harris	-
-	Andy Irvine/Paul Brady	Andy Irvine & Paul Brady	-
-	Flyin' High	Blackfoot	
-	Blondie	Blondie	Debut
-	Brass Construction II	Brass Construction	-
-	Dawn	Eloy	-
-	Oxygène	Jean Michel Jarre	France
-	Waylon Live	Waylon Jennings	Live

=== Release date unknown ===
- África Brasil – Jorge Ben
- After the Dust Settles – Juice Newton and Silver Spur
- Automatic Man – Automatic Man
- Basie Jam 2 – Count Basie
- Basie Jam 3 – Count Basie
- The Book of Invasions – Horslips
- Both Sides of Ray Stevens – Ray Stevens
- Broken Glass – Broken Glass
- Celebration - Roger Miller
- Chicken Skin Music – Ry Cooder
- City Boy – City Boy
- Coup de chapeau au passé – Dalida
- Cry Tough – Nils Lofgren
- Daniel Amos – Daniel Amos
- The David Grisman Rounder Record - David Grisman
- David Soul – David Soul
- Disco Train – Donny Osmond
- Dr. Buzzard's Original Savannah Band – Dr. Buzzard's Original Savannah Band
- The Early Show – Art Pepper
- Everyday of My Life – Michael Bolton
- Everything Must Change - Randy Crawford
- Fitzgerald and Pass... Again – Ella Fitzgerald, Joe Pass
- Fly with the Wind – McCoy Tyner
- Focal Point – McCoy Tyner
- From My Private Collection – Sergio Con Amore – Sergio Franchi
- Good High – Brick
- Good Morning – Daevid Allen
- Greatest Hits – War
- Hit the Road Jack – Big Youth
- Homecooking - Sérgio Mendes
- Hot Tracks – Nazareth
- I Told You So – Count Basie
- In the Falling Dark – Bruce Cockburn
- It's a Good Night for Singing – Jerry Jeff Walker
- Jammy Smears – Ivor Cutler
- Just a Matter of Time - Marlena Shaw
- Kites – Jade Warrior
- Late General Murtala Ramat Mohammed – Salawa Abeni
- Life & Times – Billy Cobham
- A Little Bit More – Dr. Hook & The Medicine Show
- Lone Star – Lone Star
- Look My Way – Rosemary Clooney
- Love To The World – L.T.D.
- Mahogany Rush IV – Mahogany Rush
- Man to Man – Hot Chocolate
- The Manhattans – The Manhattans
- Marriott – Steve Marriott
- Message in the Music – The O'Jays
- Metallic K.O. – The Stooges – Live 1973–'74
- Mind Exploding – Lucifer's Friend
- Misty – Ray Stevens
- Mondo Deco – The Quick
- More, More, More – Andrea True Connection
- Mother Earth's Plantasia – Mort Garson
- Moxy II – Moxy
- Music from the Penguin Cafe – Penguin Cafe Orchestra
- Mysteries - Keith Jarrett
- Natty Cultural Dread – Big Youth
- No Rest for the Wicked – Truth and Janey
- Nobody Knows What You Do - John Hartford
- A Parcel of Rogues – The Dubliners
- Pangaea – Miles Davis – Live
- Passport – Nana Mouskouri
- Ports of the Heart – Jimmie Spheeris
- Ratcity in Blue – Good Rats
- Right Time – Mighty Diamonds
- R-O-C-K – Bill Haley & His Comets
- Romantic Warrior – Return to Forever
- Satisfied 'n Tickled Too - Taj Mahal
- Seed of Memory – Terry Reid
- Sergio Franchi – Sergio Franchi (TeleHouse album)
- Sergio Franchi Sings Volare – Sergio Franchi (Chrysler Corp. Promo)
- Shades - Keith Jarrett
- Ship of Memories – Focus
- Southern Tracks & Fantasies – Paul Davis
- Sowiesoso – Cluster
- Still Shakin' – Flamin' Groovies
- A Street Called Straight – Roy Buchanan
- Streetheart – Dion
- Sunday Street - Dave Van Ronk
- This Is Sergio Franchi – Sergio Franchi (compilation)
- Trenchtown Mix Up – The Gladiators
- The Visitation – Chrome
- Von Herz zu Herz – Die Flippers
- The Wild Tchoupitoulas – The Meters, George & Amos Landry, The Neville Brothers
- Yesterday and Today – Y&T (debut)
- Zombie – Fela Kuti

== Billboard Top popular records of 1976 ==
from Billboard December 27, 1975

"TOP RECORDS OF 1975 (from Billboard) The information compiled for the top records survey is based on the weekly chart positioning and length of time records were on the respective charts from the issue dates of November 8, 1975 through October 30, 1976. These recaps, as well as the weekly charts, do not reflect actual sales figures. The ratings take into account the number of weeks the disk was on the chart, plus the weekly positions it held during its chart life. Each disk was given points accordingly for its respective chart, and in addition, the number one disk each week was assigned bonus points equal to the total number of positions on its respective charts."

Unfortunately, Billboard's late December print deadline prevented approximately 60 records from completing their full chart runs, and includes data of approximately 50 records from 1976, some of which have enough points to rank in the current years chart. In contrast with the Billboard Year-End Hot 100 singles of 1976, the chart below does not truncate or split chart runs between years. It does not add two months from 1975, delete two months from 1976 and then call itself the "Year-End Hot 100 singles of 1976", which it is obviously not. Joel Whitburn's Records Research books, archived issues of Billboard for November-December 1975 and December 1976-March 1976, and Hot 100 Year-End formulas were used to complete the year-end chart reprinted here.

The completed Billboard year-end list for 1976 is composed of records that entered the Billboard Hot 100 between November 1975 and December 1976. Records with chart runs that started in 1975 and ended in 1976, or started in 1976 and ended in 1976, made this chart if the majority of their chart weeks were in 1976. If not, they were ranked in the year-end charts for 1975 or 1976. If their weeks were equal, they were listed in the year they first entered. Appearing in multiple years is not permitted. Each week thirty points were awarded to the number one record, then nineteen points for number two, eighteen points for number three, and so on. The total points a record earned determined its year-end rank. The complete chart life of each record is represented, with number of points accrued. There are no ties, even when multiple records have the same number of points. The next ranking category is peak chart position, then weeks at peak chart position, weeks on Hot 100 chart, weeks in top forty, and finally weeks in top ten. All chart rankings represented below for the Top Soul Singles, Top Country Singles, Top Easy Listening Singles, and Top CashBox pop singles were all calculated in the same manner.

The chart can be sorted by Artist, Song title, Recording and Release dates, Cashbox year-end ranking (CB) or units sold (sales) by clicking on the column header. Additional details for each record can be accessed by clicking on the song title, and referring to the Infobox in the right column of the song page. Billboard also has chart summaries on its website. Sales information was derived from the RIAA's Gold and Platinum database, the BRIT Certified database and The Book of Golden Discs, but numbers listed should be regarded as estimates. Grammy Hall of Fame and National Recording Registry information with sources can be found on Wikipedia.

Rank	Artist	Title	Label	Recorded	Release date	CB	Sales	Charts, Awards
1	Rod Stewart	"Tonight's The Night (Gonna Be Alright)"	Warner Bros. 8262	December 1975	September 1976	2	3.25	US Billboard 1976 #1, Hot 100 #1 for 7 weeks, 23 total weeks, 296 points, Grammy Hall of Fame 1998, National Recording Registry 2012
2	Paul McCartney and Wings	"Silly Love Songs"	Capitol 4256	January 16, 1976	April 1, 1976	4	2.00	US Billboard 1976 #2, Hot 100 #1 for 5 weeks, 19 total weeks, 258 points, Grammy Hall of Fame 2000
3	Wild Cherry	"Play That Funky Music"	Epic 50225	1976	April 1976	14	2.00	US Billboard 1976 #3, Hot 100 #1 for 3 weeks, 25 total weeks, 216 points, Top Soul Singles 1976 #13, Hot Soul Singles #1 for 2 weeks, 20 total weeks, 181 points
4	Barry Manilow	"I Write the Songs"	Arista 0157	October 1976	November 1976	3	2.00	US Billboard 1976 #4, Hot 100 #1 for 1 week, 19 total weeks, 205 points, Top Easy Listening Singles 1976 #7, Easy Listening Singles #1 for 2 weeks, 13 total weeks, 172 points, Top Easy Listening Singles 1976 #7, Easy Listening Singles #1 for 2 weeks, 13 total weeks, 172 points, Grammy Hall of Fame 2000
5	Elton John Kiki Dee	"Don't Go Breaking My Heart"	Rocket 40585	March 27, 1976	June 21, 1976	12	2.50	US Billboard 1976 #5, Hot 100 #1 for 4 weeks, 20 total weeks, 195 points, Top Easy Listening Singles 1976 #11, Easy Listening Singles #1 for 1 week, 13 total weeks, 167 points, Grammy Hall of Fame 2017
6	Walter Murphy	"A Fifth Of Beethoven"	Private Stock 45,073	1976	April 1976	6	3.25	US Billboard 1976 #6, Hot 100 #1 for 1 week, 20 total weeks, 194 points
7	Rick Dees	"Disco Duck (Part 1)"	RSO 857	1976	September 4, 1976	7	2.00	US Billboard 1976 #7, Hot 100 #1 for 1 week, 25 total weeks, 191 points
8	The Bee Gees	"You Should Be Dancing"	RSO 853	February 1976	June 1976	19	2.00	US Billboard 1976 #8, Hot 100 #1 for 1 week, 20 total weeks, 189 points, Grammy Hall of Fame 2011
9	The Manhattans	"Kiss and Say Goodbye"	Columbia 10310	1975	March 1976	5	2.25	US Billboard 1976 #9, Hot 100 #1 for 2 weeks, 26 total weeks, 186 points, Top Soul Singles 1976 #5, Hot Soul Singles #1 for 1 weeks, 26 total weeks, 229 points
10	K.C. and the Sunshine Band	"(Shake, Shake, Shake) Shake Your Booty"	T.K. 1019	1975	May 27, 1976	26	1.50	US Billboard 1976 #10, Hot 100 #1 for 1 week, 21 total weeks, 186 points, Top Soul Singles 1976 #3, Hot Soul Singles #1 for 4 weeks, 18 total weeks, 268 points, Grammy Hall of Fame 2004
11	Johnnie Taylor	"Disco Lady"	Columbia 10281	1975	January 1976	20	2.25	US Billboard 1976 #11, Hot 100 #1 for 4 weeks, 19 total weeks, 185 points, Top Soul Singles 1976 #2, Hot Soul Singles #1 for 6 weeks, 21 total weeks, 299 points
12	Chicago	"If You Leave Me Now"	Columbia 10390	April 1976}	July 30, 1976	15	1.50	US Billboard 1976 #12, Hot 100 #1 for 2 weeks, 21 total weeks, 180 points, Top Easy Listening Singles 1976 #6, Easy Listening Singles #1 for 1 week, 18 total weeks, 185 points
13	England Dan and John Ford Coley	"I'd Really Love to See You Tonight"	Big Tree 16069	December 1975	May 1976	35	1.50	US Billboard 1976 #13, Hot 100 #2 for 2 weeks, 24 total weeks, 173 points, Top Easy Listening Singles 1976 #5, Easy Listening Singles #1 for 1 week, 16 total weeks, 187 points, Grammy Hall of Fame 2017
14	Diana Ross	"Love Hangover"	Motown 1392	1975	March 16, 1976	30	1.50	US Billboard 1976 #14, Hot 100 #1 for 2 weeks, 18 total weeks, 172 points
15	Boz Scaggs	"Lowdown"	Columbia 10367	October 1975	June 1976	16	3.00	US Billboard 1976 #15, Hot 100 #3 for 2 weeks, 22 total weeks, 171 points, Grammy Hall of Fame 2004
16	Lou Rawls	"You'll Never Find Another Love Like Mine"	Philadelphia International 3592	March 1976	May 1976	39	2.50	US Billboard 1976 #16, Hot 100 #2 for 2 weeks, 17 total weeks, 170 points, Top Soul Singles 1976 #9, Hot Soul Singles #1 for 2 weeks, 22 total weeks, 212 points, Top Easy Listening Singles 1976 #10, Easy Listening Singles #1 for 1 week, 14 total weeks, 167 points
17	The Four Seasons	"December, 1963 (Oh, What a Night)"	Warner Bros. 8168	November 1975	December 1975	40	1.50	US Billboard 1976 #17, Hot 100 #1 for 3 weeks, 27 total weeks, 169 points
18	Leo Sayer	"You Make Me Feel Like Dancing"	Warner Bros. 8283	1976	October 1976	15	1.50	US Billboard 1976 #18, Hot 100 #1 for 1 week, 21 total weeks, 169 points
19	Gary Wright	"Dream Weaver"	Warner Bros. 8167	February 1975	December 1975	18	2.00	US Billboard 1976 #19, Hot 100 #2 for 3 weeks, 20 total weeks, 168 points, Grammy Hall of Fame 2000
20	Paul Simon	"50 Ways To Leave Your Lover"	Columbia 10270	April 1975	December 1975	9	2.00	US Billboard 1976 #20, Hot 100 #1 for 3 weeks, 17 total weeks, 167 points, Top Easy Listening Singles 1976 #12, Easy Listening Singles #1 for 2 weeks, 14 total weeks, 161 points, Grammy Hall of Fame 2011
21	Rose Royce	"Car Wash"	MCA 40615	1976	September 1976	133	1.50	US Billboard 1976 #21, Hot 100 #1 for 1 week, 23 total weeks, 167 points, Top Soul Singles 1976 #6, Hot Soul Singles #1 for 2 weeks, 22 total weeks, 223 points
22	C. W. McCall	"Convoy"	MGM 14839	1975	November 1975	10	2.25	US Billboard 1976 #22, Hot 100 #1 for 1 week, 16 total weeks, 166 points, Top Country Singles 1976 #1, Country Singles #1 for 6 weeks, 15 total weeks, 225 points
23	John Sebastian	"Welcome Back"	Reprise 1349	February 1976	March 1976	8	3.00	US Billboard 1976 #23, Hot 100 #1 for 1 week, 19 total weeks, 162 points
24	Steve Miller Band	"Rock'n Me"	Capitol 4323	1975	August 1976	23	1.50	US Billboard 1976 #24, Hot 100 #1 for 1 week, 18 total weeks, 161 points, Grammy Hall of Fame 1998
25	Eric Carmen	"All By Myself"	Arista 0165	1975	December 1975	31	1.50	US Billboard 1976 #25, Hot 100 #2 for 3 weeks, 24 total weeks, 161 points, Grammy Hall of Fame 1998
26	Gary Wright	"Love Is Alive"	Warner Bros. 8143	1975	April 1976	43	1.25	US Billboard 1976 #26, Hot 100 #2 for 2 weeks, 27 total weeks, 161 points, Grammy Hall of Fame 2000
27	The Bee Gees	"Love So Right"	RSO 859	February 1976	September 1976	32	2.00	US Billboard 1976 #27, Hot 100 #3 for 4 weeks, 23 total weeks, 161 points, Grammy Hall of Fame 2011
28	Starland Vocal Band	"Afternoon Delight"	Windsong 10588	November 1975	April 1976	1	2.50	US Billboard 1976 #28, Hot 100 #1 for 2 weeks, 20 total weeks, 160 points
29	Marilyn McCoo & Billy Davis Jr.	"You Don't Have To Be A Star (To Be In My Show)"	ABC 12208	1976	September 1976	11	1.50	US Billboard 1976 #29, Hot 100 #1 for 1 week, 26 total weeks, 160 points
30	The Spinners	"The Rubberband Man"	Atlantic 3355	1976	August 1976	45	1.25	US Billboard 1976 #30, Hot 100 #2 for 3 weeks, 21 total weeks, 160 points, Grammy Hall of Fame 2017
31	Silver Convention	"Get Up And Boogie (That's Right)"	Midland International 10571	1976	March 1976	24	1.25	US Billboard 1976 #31, Hot 100 #2 for 3 weeks, 21 total weeks, 159 points
37	Brick	"Dazz"	Bang 727	May 1976	July 6, 1976	38	1.50	US Billboard 1976 #37, Hot 100 #3 for 2 week, 21 total weeks, 142 points, Top Soul Singles 1976 #1, Hot Soul Singles #1 for 4 weeks, 23 total weeks, 223 points
42	Boston	"More Than a Feeling"	Epic 50266	Oct 1975-April 1976	September 1976	57	2.00	US Billboard 1976 #42, Hot 100 #5 for 1 weeks, 19 total weeks, 132 points, Top Rock 1976 #1, Grammy Hall of Fame 1998
63	Engelbert Humperdinck	"After the Lovin'"	Epic 50270	June-July 1976	October 1976	52	2.00	US Billboard 1976 #63, Hot 100 #8 for 1 weeks, 19 total weeks, 88 points, Top Easy Listening Singles 1976 #1, Easy Listening Singles #1 for 2 weeks, 26 total weeks, 304 points
77	Queen	"Bohemian Rhapsody"	EMI 0109	August-September 1975	October 31, 1975	58	4.25	US Billboard 1976 #77, Hot 100 #9 for 2 weeks, 24 total weeks, 68 points, Grammy Hall of Fame 2004, National Recording Registry 2022, from album A Night at the Opera-Elektra 1053, Grammy Hall of Fame 2018.

== Chronological table of US and UK and Japan number one hit singles ==
US number one singles and artist (weeks at number one)	UK number one singles and artist (weeks at number one)
"Saturday Night" – Bay City Rollers (1) "Convoy" – C. W. McCall (1) "I Write the Songs" – Barry Manilow (1) "Theme from Mahogany (Do You Know Where You're Going To)" – Diana Ross (1) "Love Rollercoaster" – Ohio Players (1) "50 Ways to Leave Your Lover" – Paul Simon (3) "Theme from S.W.A.T." – Rhythm Heritage (1) "Love Machine" – The Miracles (1) "December, 1963 (Oh, What a Night) – The Four Seasons (3) "Disco Lady" – Johnnie Taylor (4) "Let Your Love Flow" – The Bellamy Brothers (1) "Welcome Back" – John Sebastian (1) "Boogie Fever" – The Sylvers (1) "Silly Love Songs" – Paul McCartney & Wings (5) "Love Hangover" – Diana Ross (2) "Afternoon Delight" – Starland Vocal Band (2) "Kiss and Say Goodbye" – The Manhattans (2) "Don't Go Breaking My Heart" – Elton John & Kiki Dee (4) "You Should Be Dancing" – Bee Gees (1) "(Shake, Shake, Shake) Shake Your Booty" – KC and the Sunshine Band (1) "Play That Funky Music" – Wild Cherry (3) "A Fifth of Beethoven" – Walter Murphy & The Big Apple Band (1) "Disco Duck" – Rick Dees & His Cast Of Idiots (1) "If You Leave Me Now" – Chicago (2) "Rock'n Me" – Steve Miller Band (1) "Tonight's The Night" – Rod Stewart (7 weeks 1976 + 1 week 1977), best seller of the year	"Bohemian Rhapsody" – Queen (5 weeks 1975 + 4 weeks 1976) "Mamma Mia" – ABBA (2) "Forever and Ever" – Slik (1) "December, 1963 (Oh, What a Night)" – The Four Seasons (2) "I Love to Love (But My Baby Loves to Dance)" – Tina Charles (3) "Save Your Kisses for Me" – Brotherhood of Man (6), best seller of the year "Fernando" – ABBA (4) "No Charge" – J. J. Barrie (1) "Combine Harvester (Brand New Key) " – The Wurzels (2) "You to Me Are Everything" – The Real Thing (3) "Forever and Ever" – Demis Roussos (1) "Don't Go Breaking My Heart" – Elton John & Kiki Dee (6) "Dancing Queen" – ABBA (6) "Mississippi" – Pussycat (4) "If You Leave Me Now" – Chicago (3) "Under the Moon of Love" – Showaddywaddy (3) "When a Child is Born" – Johnny Mathis (1 week 1976 + 2 weeks 1977)

Japanese Oricon number one singles and artist
(weeks at number one)

- "Oyoge! Taiyaki-kun" – Masato Shimon (11)
- "Beautiful Sunday" (Japanese title: (ビューティフル・サンデー)) – Daniel Boone (15)
- "Yokosuka Story" – Momoe Yamaguchi (7)
- "Anata Dake wo" – Teruhiko Aoi (6)
- "Pearl Color ni Yurete" – Momoe Yamaguchi (5)
- "Ochiba ga Yuki ni" – Akira Fuse (1)
- "Abayo" – Naoko Ken (4)
- "Kita no Yadokara" – Harumi Miyako (3 weeks in 1976 + 2 weeks in 1977)

== Top 40 Chart hit singles ==
Song title	Artist(s)	Release date(s)	US	UK	Highest chart position	Other Chart Performance(s)
"16 Bars"	The Stylistics	August 1976	n/a	7	7 (United Kingdom)	9 (Ireland)
"After the Lovin'"	Engelbert Humperdinck	October 1976	8	n/a	1 (New Zealand)	1 (Canada Adult Contemporary) - 1 (U.S. Billboard Adult Contemporary) - 5 (U.S. Cash Box Top 100) - 13 (Australia) - 40 (U.S. Billboard Hot Country Singles)
"All By Myself"	Eric Carmen	January 1976	2	12	2 (United States)	See chart performance entry
"Arms of Mary"	Sutherland Brothers and Quiver	March 1976	81	5	1 (Belgium, Ireland, Netherlands)	28 (Australia) - 32 (New Zealand)

=== Other Chart hit singles ===
- "Anarchy in the U.K." – Sex Pistols
- "Baby, I Love Your Way" – Peter Frampton
- "The Best Disco in Town" – Ritchie Family (medley)
- "Beth" – Kiss
- "Blinded by the Light" – Manfred Mann's Earth Band
- "The Boys Are Back in Town" – Thin Lizzy
- "Come On Over" – Olivia Newton-John
- "Couldn't Get It Right" – Climax Blues Band
- "Crazy on You" – Heart
- "Daddy Cool – Boney M.
- "Dazz" – Brick
- "Devil Woman" – Cliff Richard
- "Don't Take Away the Music" – Tavares
- "Do You Feel Like We Do" – Peter Frampton
- "Doctor Kiss Kiss" – 5000 Volts
- "Doina de Jale (The Light of Experience)" – Gheorghe Zamfir
- "(Don't Fear) The Reaper" – Blue Öyster Cult
- "A Dose of Rock 'n' Roll" – Ringo Starr
- "Dream Weaver" – Gary Wright
- "Dreamboat Annie" – Heart
- "Evil Woman" – Electric Light Orchestra
- "Fanny (Be Tender with My Love)" – Bee Gees
- "Fly Away" – John Denver (with backing vocals by Olivia Newton-John)
- "Fooled Around and Fell in Love – The Elvin Bishop Group
- "Fopp" – Ohio Players
- "Fox on the Run" – Sweet
- "Fool to Cry" – The Rolling Stones
- "Get Closer" – Seals and Crofts
- "Get the Funk Out Ma Face" – Brothers Johnson
- "Getaway" – Earth, Wind and Fire
- "Golden Years" – David Bowie
- "(Giving Him) Something He Can Feel" – Aretha Franklin
- "Get Up and Boogie" – Silver Convention
- "Got to Get You Into My Life" – The Beatles
- "Grow Some Funk of Your Own" – Elton John
- "Happy Days" – Pratt and McLain with Brotherlove
- "Happy Music" – Blackbyrds
- "Heart On My Sleeve" – Gallagher and Lyle
- "Heaven Must Be Missing an Angel" – Tavares
- "Hot Line" – The Sylvers
- "Howzat" – Sherbet
- "Hurricane" – Bob Dylan
- "I Love Music" – The O'Jays
- "I Do, I Do, I Do, I Do, I Do" – ABBA
- "I Feel Like a Bullet (In the Gun of Robert Ford)" – Elton John
- "I Love to Boogie" – T. Rex
- "I Need to Be in Love" – The Carpenters
- "I Never Cry" – Alice Cooper
- "I Only Want to Be with You" – The Bay City Rollers
- "I Want You" – Marvin Gaye
- "I Wish" – Stevie Wonder
- "I'd Really Love to See You Tonight" – England Dan and John Ford Coley
- "I'll Be Good to You" – Brothers Johnson
- "I'm Mandy Fly Me" – 10cc
- "If You Know What I Mean" – Neil Diamond
- "In Dulci Jubilo / On Horseback" – Mike Oldfield
- "In Zaire" – Johnny Wakelin
- "Junk Food Junkie" – Larry Groce
- "Just to Be Close to You" – The Commodores
- "The Killing of Georgie (Part I and II)" – Rod Stewart
- "Let 'Em In" – Paul McCartney & Wings
- "Let Her In" – John Travolta
- "Let's Call It Quits" – Slade
- "Let's Do It Again" – The Staple Singers
- "Let's Stick Together" – Bryan Ferry
- "Like A Sad Song" – John Denver
- "A Little Bit More" – Dr. Hook
- "Livin' for the Weekend" – The O'Jays
- "Livin' Thing" – Electric Light Orchestra
- "Lonely Night (Angel Face)" – The Captain and Tennille
- "Love And Affection" – Joan Armatrading
- "Love Ballad" – L.T.D.
- "Love Hurts" – Nazareth
- "Love in the Shadows" – Neil Sedaka
- "Love Is Alive" – Gary Wright
- "Love Me" – Yvonne Elliman
- "Love Really Hurts Without You" – Billy Ocean
- "Love So Right" – Bee Gees
- "Love to Love You Baby" – Donna Summer
- "Lowdown" – Boz Scaggs
- "Magic Man" – Heart
- "Miss You Nights" – Cliff Richard
- "Misty Blue" – Dorothy Moore
- "Money Honey" – The Bay City Rollers
- "Money, Money, Money" – ABBA
- "Moonlight Feels Right" – Starbuck
- "More, More, More" – Andrea True Connection
- "More Than a Feeling" – Boston
- "Movin'" – Brass Construction
- "Music" – John Miles
- "Muskrat Love" – The Captain & Tennille
- "Nadia's Theme (The Young & The Restless)" – Barry DeVorzon & Perry Botkin, Jr.
- "Never Gonna Fall in Love Again" – Eric Carmen
- "Nice 'n' Nasty" – Salsoul Orchestra
- "Nights Are Forever Without You" – England Dan & John Ford Coley
- "One Love in My Lifetime" – Diana Ross
- "Only Sixteen" – Dr. Hook
- "Over My Head" – Fleetwood Mac
- "Pinball Wizard" – Elton John
- "Rain" – Status Quo
- "Rhiannon" – Fleetwood Mac
- "Right Back Where We Started From" – Maxine Nightingale
- "Rock and Roll All Nite" – Kiss (live version)
- "Rock and Roll Music" – The Beach Boys
- "Rodrigo's Guitar Concerto (Concerto De Aranjuez)" – Manuel and His Music of the Mountains
- "Roxy Roller" – Sweeney Todd
- "The Rubberband Man" – The Detroit Spinners
- "Sara Smile" – Daryl Hall & John Oates
- "Say You Love Me" – Fleetwood Mac
- "Shannon" – Henry Gross
- "She's Gone" – Daryl Hall & John Oates
- "Shop Around" – The Captain & Tennille
- "Shout It Out Loud" – Kiss
- "Show Me the Way" – Peter Frampton
- "Silly Love Songs" – Paul McCartney & Wings
- "Silver Star" – The Four Seasons
- "Sing a Song" – Earth, Wind and Fire
- "Somebody to Love" – Queen
- "Somewhere in the Night" – Helen Reddy
- "Sophisticated Lady (She's a Different Lady)" – Natalie Cole
- "Sorry Seems to Be the Hardest Word" – Elton John
- "Squeeze Box" – The Who
- "Still the One" – Orleans
- "Strange Magic" – Electric Light Orchestra
- "Summer" – War
- "Sunrise" – Eric Carmen
- "Sweet Thing" – Rufus featuring Chaka Khan
- "Take It To The Limit" – Eagles
- "Take the Money and Run" – Steve Miller Band
- "Takin' It to the Streets" – The Doobie Brothers
- "Tangerine" – Salsoul Orchestra
- "Tear The Roof Off The Sucker" – Parliament
- "That'll Be the Day" – Linda Ronstadt
- "There's a Kind of Hush (All Over the World)" – The Carpenters
- "This Masquerade" – George Benson
- "This Old Heart of Mine" – Rod Stewart
- "Times of Your Life" – Paul Anka
- "Today's the Day" – America
- "Tryin' to Get the Feeling Again" – Barry Manilow
- "Turn the Beat Around" – Vickie Sue Robinson
- "Wake Up Everybody" – Harold Melvin and the Blue Notes
- "Walk Away from Love" – David Ruffin
- "Weekend In New England" – Barry Manilow
- "Wham Bam" – Silver
- "Who'd She Coo?" – Ohio Players
- "With Your Love" – Jefferson Starship
- "The Wreck of the Edmund Fitzgerald" – Gordon Lightfoot
- "Year of the Cat" – Al Stewart
- "You Are My Starship" – Norman Connors
- "You Are the Woman" – Firefall
- "You Make Me Feel Like Dancing" – Leo Sayer
- "You See The Trouble With Me" – Barry White
- "You Sexy Thing" – Hot Chocolate
- "You'll Never Find Another Love Like Mine" – Lou Rawls
- "You're My Best Friend" – Queen
- "Young Hearts Run Free" – Candi Staton

== Notable singles ==
Song title	Artist(s)	Release date(s)	Highest Chart Position(s)	Other Chart Performance(s)
"Anarchy in the U.K."	Sex Pistols	November 1976	38 (United Kingdom)	n/a
"(I'm) Stranded"	The Saints	September 1976	98 (Australia)	n/a
"I Like It Both Ways"	Supernaut	May 1976	16 (Australia)	n/a
"In the Flesh"	Blondie	October 1976	2 (Australia in September 1977)	40 (Belgium in 1982)
"New Rose"	The Damned	October 1976	n/a	n/a

=== Other Notable singles ===
- "Final Solution" b/w "Cloud 149" - Pere Ubu
- "X Offender" b/w "In the Sun" - Blondie

== Published popular music ==
- "Always and Forever" w.m. Rod Temperton
- "Dancing Queen" w.m. Benny Andersson, Stig Anderson & Björn Ulvaeus
- "Devil Woman" w.m. Terry Britten & Christine Authors
- "Don't Cry for Me, Argentina" w. Tim Rice m. Andrew Lloyd Webber
- "Don't It Make My Brown Eyes Blue" w.m. Richard Leigh
- "Evergreen" w. Paul Williams m. Barbra Streisand
- "Fernando" w.m. Benny Andersson, Stig Anderson & Björn Ulvaeus
- "Gonna Fly Now" (aka "Theme From Rocky") w. Carol Connors & Ayn Robbins m. Bill Conti
- "I Never Do Anything Twice" aka "The Madam's Song" w.m. Stephen Sondheim. Introduced by Régine in the film The Seven-Per-Cent Solution
- "Isn't She Lovely?" w.m. Stevie Wonder
- "Like a Sad Song" w.m. John Denver
- "A Little Bit More" w.m. Bobby Gosh
- "Making Our Dreams Come True" w.m. Norman Gimbel & Charles Fox, from the TV series Laverne and Shirley
- "Money, Money, Money" w.m. Benny Andersson & Björn Ulvaeus
- "Sorry Seems To Be The Hardest Word" w.m.Elton John
- "Welcome Back" w.m. John Sebastian. Theme song from the television series Welcome Back Kotter

== Other notable songs ==
- "Djambo, Djambo" w.m. Peter Reber
- "El Pasadiscos" w.m. Diego Verdaguer
- "Kabhi Kabhie Mere Dil Mein" w. Sahir Ludhianvi m. Khayyam

== Classical music ==
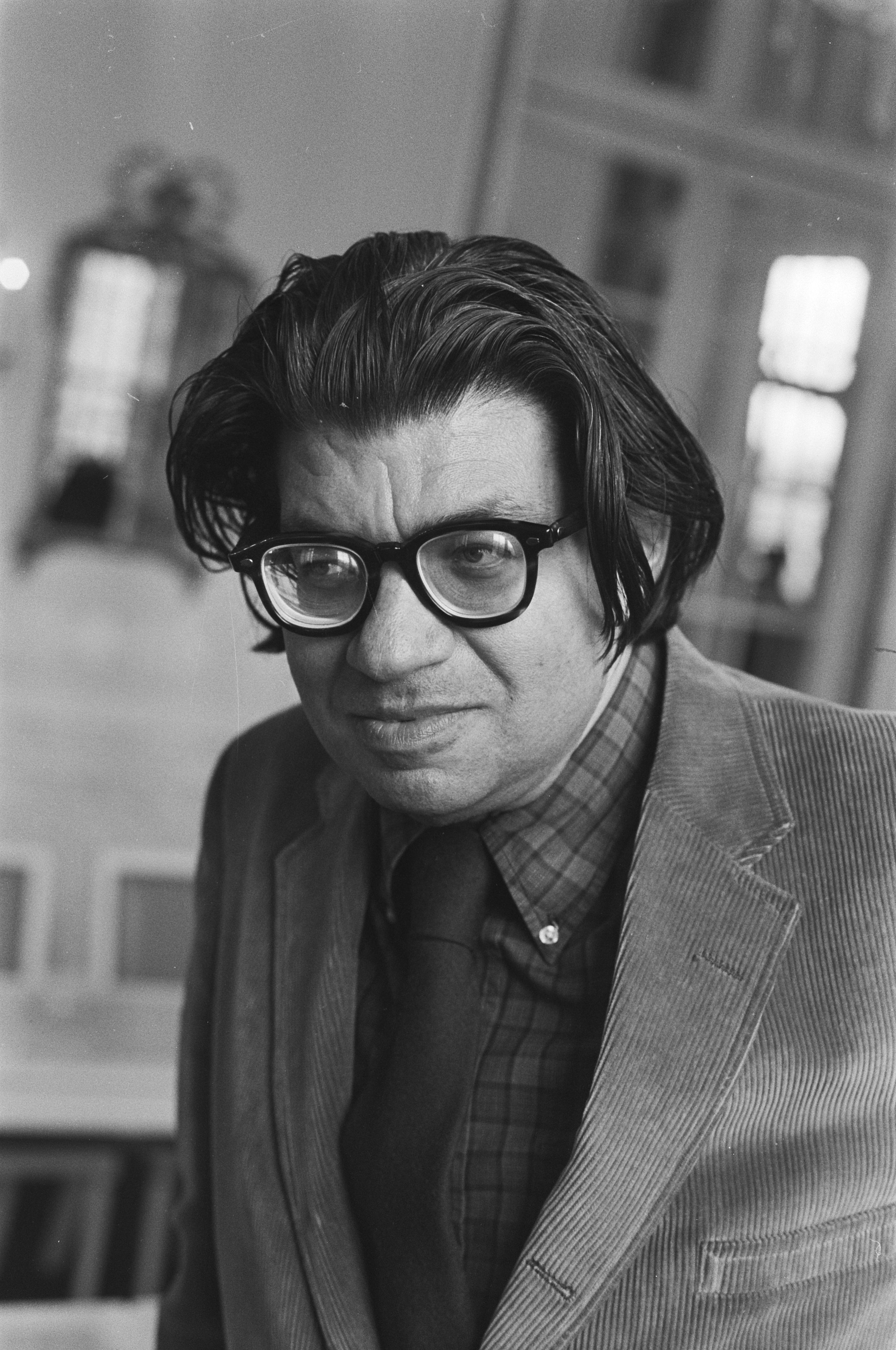
Composer Morton Feldman in 1976

- Pierre Boulez - Messagesquisse
- Geoffrey Burgon – Requiem
- Elliott Carter – A Symphony of Three Orchestras
- Brian Cherney – String Trio
- George Crumb
  - Dream Sequence (Images II) for violin, cello, piano, percussion (one player), and off-stage glass harmonica (two players)
  - Night Music I (1963, revised 1976) for soprano, piano/celeste, and two percussionists
- Mario Davidovsky – String Quartet No. 3
- Henri Dutilleux – Ainsi la nuit
- Einar Englund – Symphony No. 4 Nostalgic (in memory of Shostakovich)
- Morton Feldman
  - Elemental Procedures, for soprano, choir, and orchestra
  - Oboe and Orchestra
  - Orchestra
  - Routine Investigations, for oboe, trumpet, piano, viola, cello, and double-bass
  - Voice, Violin and Piano, for female voice, violin, and piano
- Lorenzo Ferrero
  - Le néant où l'on ne peut arriver
  - Romanza senza parole
- Henryk Górecki – Symphony No. 3 Symphony of Sorrowful Songs
- Gérard Grisey - Partiels for 18 instruments
- Nicolaus A. Huber – Darabukka for piano
- Wojciech Kilar – Kościelec 1909 for orchestra
- Ib Nørholm – Sonata No. 1, Op. 69, for guitar
- Krzysztof Penderecki – Violin Concerto No. 1
- Carmen Petra Basacopol – Sonata for flute and harp
- John Serry Sr. – Falling Leaves for piano
- Karlheinz Stockhausen – Amour
- Manfred Trojahn
  - Architectura caelestis for vocalists and orchestra
  - String Quartet No. 1

== Opera ==
- Peter Maxwell Davies – The Martyrdom of St Magnus
- Carlisle Floyd – Bilby's Doll
- Philip Glass – Einstein on the Beach

== Musical theater ==
- Bubbling Brown Sugar – Broadway production opened at the ANTA Playhouse and ran for 766 performances
- Fiddler on the Roof (Jerry Bock and Sheldon Harnick) – Broadway revival
- Guys and Dolls – Broadway revival
- Irene – London revival
- My Fair Lady (Alan Jay Lerner and Frederick Loewe) – Broadway revival
- Oh Calcutta – Broadway revival
- Pacific Overtures -Broadway production opened at the Winter Garden Theatre and ran for 193 performances.
- Porgy and Bess – Broadway revival
- Salad Days (Julian Slade) – London revival
- Side by Side by Sondheim – London production
- Starmania- French Quebec rock opera
- The Threepenny Opera (Bertolt Brecht and Kurt Weill) – Broadway revival

== Musical films ==
- The Blank Generation
- Bound for Glory
- Bugsy Malone
- Dus Numbri
- Hera Pheri
- Leadbelly
- The Slipper and the Rose
- The Song Remains the Same – Led Zeppelin
- A Star Is Born
- That's Entertainment, Part II

== Births ==
- January 8
  - Jenny Lewis, American singer-songwriter, musician, and actress. (Rilo Kiley)
  - Karen Poole, English singer-songwriter, producer
- January 9 – Hayes Carll, American singer-songwriter and guitarist
- January 12 – Melanie C, English singer, songwriter, entrepreneur, actress, stage actress, and television personality (Spice Girls)
- January 13 – Bic Runga, New Zealand singer-songwriter and multi-instrumentalist pop artist
- January 16 – Stuart Fletcher (The Seahorses)
- January 18 – Damien Leith, Australian singer/songwriter
- January 20 – Sid Wilson (Slipknot)
- January 21 – Emma Bunton, English singer, songwriter, actress, and radio and television presenter. (Spice Girls)
- January 23 – Tony Lucca, American singer-songwriter, producer and actor
- January 29
  - Chris Castle, American singer-songwriter and guitarist
  - Belle Perez, Belgian-Spanish musician and songwriter.
- February 3
  - Kenzie, South Korean songwriter and record producer
  - Sophie McDonnell, English television presenter and singer
  - Daddy Yankee, Puerto Rican singer and rapper
- February 4 – Cam'ron, American rapper
- February 5 – Abhishek Bachchan, Indian actor
- February 13 – Leslie Feist, known professionally as Feist, is a Canadian indie pop singer-songwriter and guitarist (Broken Social Scene)
- February 15
  - Brandon Boyd (Incubus)
  - Ronnie Vannucci, Jr. (The Killers)
- February 28 – Ja Rule, American rapper
- March 4 – Hayley Evetts, English actress, presenter and singer
- March 8 – Gareth Coombes, British singer (Supergrass)
- March 10 – Ane Brun, a Norwegian songwriter, guitarist, and vocalist of Sami origin
- March 15
  - Lee Min-woo, South Korean actor
  - Claudia Uhle, German singer
- March 16 – Blu Cantrell, American soul singer-songwriter
- March 17 – Stephen Gately, Irish singer (Boyzone) (d. 2009)
- March 20 – Chester Bennington, American singer-songwriter, producer, musician (Linkin Park) (d. 2017)
- March 22 – Myo Gyi, Burmese singer and guitarist
- March 23 – Keri Russell, American dancer and actor
- March 25
  - Gigi Leung, Hong Kong singer-songwriter and actress
  - Baek Ji-young, South Korean singer
- March 26 – Dave Keuning (The Killers)
- April 1 – Kim Sasabone, Dutch-Moluccan singer (Vengaboys)
- April 2 – Lucy Diakovska, German-Bulgarian pop singer
- April 4 – Kim Hyun-jung, South Korean singer
- April 10 – Jan Werner Danielsen, Norwegian singer (d. 2006)
- April 14 – Oh Ji-ho, South Korean actor
- April 18
  - Melissa Joan Hart, American actress and director
  - Sean Maguire, British actor and singer
- April 23 – Aaron Dessner, American musician, songwriter, and record producer
- April 25 – Kim Jong-kook, South Korean singer (Turbo)
- April 30 – Scott Savol, American singer
- May 7 – Jay Frog, German Disc jockey (Scooter)
- May 8
  - Martha Wainwright, singer-songwriter, daughter of Loudon Wainwright III and Kate McGarrigle
  - Ian "H" Watkins, British singer (Steps)
- May 10
  - Udo Mechels, Belgian singer
  - Rhona Bennett, American singer, songwriter, actress, author, and life coach (En Vogue)
- May 13 – Christian Kjellvander, Swedish singer and songwriter
- May 14 – Hunter Burgan (AFI)
- May 17 – Kandi Burruss, American singer-songwriter, musician, and business woman (Xscape)
- May 22 – Daniel Erlandsson, Swedish drummer (Arch Enemy)
- May 25 - Cillian Murphy, is an Irish actor. He was the lead singer, guitarist, and lyricist of the rock band The Sons of Mr. Green Genes.
- May 29 – Dave Buckner (Papa Roach)
- June 2
  - Tim Rice-Oxley, British musician (Keane)
  - Adrian Olivares (Menudo)
- June 6 – Emilie-Claire Barlow, Canadian singer-songwriter and actress
- June 7 – Necro (Ron Braunstein), American rapper and record producer
- June 11 – Tai Anderson, American rock bassist (Third Day)
- June 13
  - Jason "J" Brown, English rock musician (5ive)
  - Kym Marsh, English singer (Hear'Say)
- June 15
  - Gary Lightbody, Northern Irish rock musician and songwriter (Snow Patrol)
  - Dryden Mitchell (Alien Ant Farm)
- June 18 – Blake Shelton, American singer-songwriter and guitarist
- June 19 – Scott Avett, American folk-rock singer-songwriter and musician
- June 20 – Jerome Fontamillas, American singer and guitarist (Switchfoot, Mortal and Fold Zandura)
- June 21 – Mike Einziger (Incubus)
- June 22 – Gordon Moakes (Bloc Party)
- June 23 – Joe Becker, American guitarist and composer
- June 26 – Paul Phillips, guitarist (Puddle of Mudd)
- June 27 – Leigh Nash, American singer (Sixpence None the Richer)
- July 1
  - Justin Lo, Hong Kong singer and actor
  - Plies, American rapper
- July 3 – Shane Lynch, Irish singer (Boyzone)
- July 5
  - Bizarre, African American rapper
  - Mike DeWolf, American rock musician (Taproot)
- July 10 – Elijah Blue Allman, American musician, son of Cher and Gregg Allman
- July 12 – Tracie Spencer, American singer-songwriter and actress
- July 16 – Chiara Zeffirelli, crossover soprano
- July 17
  - Dem Jointz, American record producer and songwriter
  - Luke Bryan, American country singer
- July 20 – Andrew Stockdale, Australian rock singer/guitarist (Wolfmother)
- July 22 – Kokia, Japanese singer-songwriter
- July 23 – Terrance Zdunich, American artist, singer, actor, writer, composer, producer, illustrator and storyboard artist. (Emilie Autumn, Alexa PenaVega, Tech N9ne, Saar Hendelman)
- July 24 – Johnny McDaid, Northern Irish singer, songwriter, musician and record producer (Partner of Courteney Cox, member of Snow Patrol)
- July 27 – Susanne Georgi, Danish singer (Me & My)
- August 8
  - JC Chasez, American singer, songwriter, dancer, record producer, and occasional actor (*NSYNC)
  - Drew Lachey, American singer (98 Degrees)
- August 9 – Rhona Mitra, English actress, singer-songwriter, and model
- August 11
  - Brendan Bayliss, American rock guitarist and vocalist
  - Ben Gibbard, American rock musician (Death Cab for Cutie, The Postal Service)
- August 12
  - Mikko Lindström, Finnish rock guitarist
  - Wednesday 13, American rock lead singer (Murderdolls, FDQ)
  - Lina Rafn, Danish singer
- August 13 – Roddy Woomble, Scottish musician
- August 14 – Maya Nasri, Lebanese actress and singer
- August 18 – Alex Katunich, (Incubus)
- August 29 – Phil Harvey, English music manager (Coldplay)
- August 31 – Shar Jackson, American actress
- September 1 – Angaleena Presley, American country music singer-songwriter. (She is a member of the female country trio Pistol Annies)
- September 2
  - Eleanor Friedberger, American singer (The Fiery Furnaces)
  - Syleena Johnson, American R&B and soul singer
- September 6 – Annet Artani, Greek-American singer and songwriter.
- September 12 – Bizzy Bone, American rapper, member of Bone Thugs-n-Harmony
- September 15 – Paul Thomson, English drummer and singer (Franz Ferdinand)
- September 16
  - Tina Barrett, British singer-songwriter, actor, and dancer (S Club 7)
  - DJ Official, American DJ, record producer and singer (116 Clique) (d. 2016)
  - Elīna Garanča, Latvian operatic mezzo-soprano operatic soprano
- September 21 – Jonas Bjerre, Danish musician, singer, virtual artist, and composer (Mew)
- September 22 – Martin Solveig, French DJ, singer, songwriter and record producer.
- September 23 – Sarah Blasko, Australian singer/songwriter/producer
- September 25 – Santigold, American singer, producer, songwriter
- September 29
  - Darren Byfield, English former footballer
  - Megan Alatini, South African-New Zealand pop singer, actress, and television personality (TrueBliss)
- October 1 – Richard Oakes, English musician and songwriter (Suede)
- October 2 – Mandisa, American singer (d. 2024)
- October 6
  - Barbie Hsu, Taiwanese actress and singer (d. 2025)
  - Yotuel Romero, Cuban singer, actor, and current lead singer and co-writer of Orishas. (Beatrix Luengo)
- October 7 – Taylor Hicks, American singer
- October 19 – Omar Gooding, rapper
- October 20 – Tom Wisniewski (MxPx)
- October 22
  - Jon Foreman, American rock singer/guitarist (Switchfoot)
  - Miss Papaya, Danish singer
- October 25
  - Angela Beyincé, American songwriter, actress and music executive
  - Lisa Armstrong, English make-up artist, actress, and singer (Deuce)
- October 29 – Mark Sheehan, Irish guitarist (The Script) (d. 2023)
- October 30 – Kassidy Osborn, American country singer (SHeDAISY)
- November 1 – Cosima De Vito, Australian soul singer
- November 2 – Mike Leon Grosch, German singer
- November 6 – Mike Herrera (MxPx)
- November 11 – Jesse F. Keeler (Death from Above 1979)
- November 12 – Tevin Campbell, singer-songwriter
- November 13 – Shagrath, Dimmu Borgir
- November 16 – Mario Barravecchia, Italian singer
- November 18 – Shagrath, Norwegian black metal musician (Dimmu Borgir)
- November 19 – Jun Shibata, Japanese singer and songwriter
- November 26
  - Jean Grae, an American hip hop recording artist, actress, and comedia
  - Joe Nichols, American singer
- November 27 – INOJ, American R&B, singer and songwriter
- November 29 – Anna Faris, American actress, producer, model, comedian and singer
- December 4 – Amie Comeaux, American country music singer (d. 1997)
- December 12 – Dan Hawkins, British rock guitarist (The Darkness)
- December 17 – Tiki Taane, New Zealand-based musician, experimentalist, musical activist, producer, and live engineer.
- December 18 – Red Café (Jermaine Denny), rapper
- December 20 – Jang Hyuk, South Korean actor
- December 23 – Amjad Sabri, Qawwali singer (murdered 2016)
- December 25
  - Tuomas Holopainen, Finnish metal keyboardist (Nightwish)
  - Armin van Buuren, Dutch music producer and DJ
- December 28 - Eric Griffin, American heavy metal and rock guitarist.
- date unknown
  - Philip Howard, pianist and composer
  - John Collura (The Ataris)
  - Patrick Riley (The Ataris)
  - Milosh, Canadian EDM star, (formerly married to Alexa Nikolas)

== Deaths ==
- January 8 – George Baker, English singer, 90
- January 10 – Howlin' Wolf, American blues musician, 65
- January 16 – Vasco Campagnano, Italian operatic tenor, 65
- January 18 – Friedrich Hollaender, German composer, 79
- January 23 – Paul Robeson, American singer, 77
- January 25 – Chris Kenner, American singer-songwriter, 46 (heart attack)
- January 26 – Luis Alberti, Dominican Republic composer and musician, 69
- January 29 – Jesse Fuller, American blues musician, 79
- January 30 – Mance Lipscomb, American blues musician, 80
- January 31 – Evert Taube, Swedish composer and singer, 85
- February 5 – Rudy Pompilli, saxophone player and 20-year member of Bill Haley & His Comets, 50 (lung cancer)
- February 6 – Vince Guaraldi, jazz musician and pianist, 47
- February 9 – Percy Faith, bandleader and composer, 67
- February 12 – Sal Mineo, actor and singer, 37 (murdered)
- February 13 – Lily Pons, coloratura soprano, 77
- February 22 – Florence Ballard, The Supremes, 32 (coronary thrombosis)
- February 25 – Tarquinia Tarquini, operatic soprano, 93
- February 28 – Fritz Krauss, operatic tenor, 92
- March 14 – Busby Berkeley, musical director and choreographer, 80
- March 19 – Paul Kossoff, guitarist, (Free), 25 (cerebral and pulmonary oedema)
- March 25 – Maria Zamboni, operatic soprano, 80
- March 26 – Duster Bennett, blues musician, 29 (car accident)
- April 9 – Phil Ochs, protest singer, 35 (suicide)
- April 14 – Erna Ellmenreich, operatic soprano, 90
- April 25 – Alexander Brailowsky, pianist, 80
- May 12
  - Rudolf Kempe, conductor, 65
  - Keith Relf, vocalist (The Yardbirds), 35 (cardiac arrest due to electrocution)
- May 15 – David Munrow, early music performer, 33 (suicide)
- May 21 – Harold Blair, operatic tenor, 51
- May 26 – Maggie Teyte, operatic soprano, 88
- June 6 – Elisabeth Rethberg, operatic soprano, 81
- June 25 – Johnny Mercer, singer and songwriter, 66
- June 28
  - Malcolm Lockyer, film composer and conductor, 52
  - Yakov Zak, pianist and music teacher, 62
- August 2 – Cecilia, Spanish singer-songwriter, 27 (road accident)
- August 6 – Gregor Piatigorsky, Russian cellist, 73
- August 24 – Michael Head, composer, 76
- August 26 – Lotte Lehmann, opera singer, 88
- August 27 – Mukesh, Indian singer, 53 (heart attack)
- August 29 – Jimmy Reed, US blues musician, 50
- September 26 – L.C. Robinson, US blues musician, 61
- October 3 – Victoria Spivey, US singer, pianist and composer, 69
- October 8 – Serge Walter, Russian-born American composer and songwriter
- October 11
  - Connee Boswell, US singer, member of the Boswell Sisters, 68
  - Alfredo Bracchi, Italian lyricist, 78
  - Werner Haas, pianist, 45 (car accident)
- October 21 – Jean Berveiller, organist and composer, 73
- November 12 – Walter Piston, composer, 82
- December 4
  - Benjamin Britten, composer, 63
  - Tommy Bolin, guitarist, 25 (drug-induced suffocation)
- December 6 – Raymond Hanson, composer, 63
- December 28 – Freddie King, blues musician, 42
- Date Unknown – Patrick Kelly, Irish folk fiddler

== Awards ==
=== Grammy Awards ===
- Grammy Awards of 1976

=== Eurovision Song Contest ===
- Eurovision Song Contest 1976

=== Japan Record Awards ===
- 18th Japan Record Awards
