= Brass Construction (album) =

Studio album by Brass Construction
- Released: 1975
- Studio: Ultra-Sonic, Hempstead, New York; N.Y. Groove, New York City, New York
- Genre: Funk; disco; dance; soul
- Length: 41:00
- Label: United Artists
- Producer: Jeff Lane

Brass Construction chronology
Brass Construction (1975)	Brass Construction II (1976)

Singles from Brass Construction
- 1. "Movin'" Released: 1976; 2. "Changin'" Released: 1976

Brass Construction is the self-titled debut album by the American funk band Brass Construction, released in autumn 1975 by United Artists Records. Recorded with producer Jeff Lane, the album weaves different influences, including Latin music and jazz, into the band's rhythmic funk style, and emphasises the group's brass section. The album's songs, all of which are named using a single verb, feature simplistic, repetitive lyrics, reflecting the group's desire for audiences to interpret the songs as they wish. Critics noted themes of social awareness in the lyrics.

The album's release was delayed due to other projects involving lead member Randy Muller, but proved to be a surprise success, reaching the top ten of the US Billboard albums chart and the UK Albums Chart, where it was the first disco album to do so. It also reached number one on the US Soul chart, while the singles "Movin'" and "Changin'" also proved commercially successful. Music critics acclaimed the album for its tight sound and lyrical simplicity, and it went on to influence the Britfunk movement of the late 1970s and early 1980s. Soul Brothers Records re-released the album in 2010.

== Background and recording ==
Brass Construction formed in Brooklyn, New York under the name The Dynamic Soul in 1967. Originally a rock/R&B quartet under the leadership of Randy Muller, the group gradually expanded until they had become a nine-piece by 1972, with new members bringing influences of jazz and Latin music. Muller felt the enlarged personnel necessitated a name change, so the group renamed themselves Brass Construction, chosen because he believed the group placed a strong emphasis on their brass section "though we keep a tight rhythm going." The group's first single, "Two Timin' Lady", was released in 1972 by Docc, a record label owned by producer Jeff Lane.

Lane was impressed with Muller's musical arranging skills and asked him to provide string arrangements for B.T. Express, a group he had begun producing. Two of the group's songs to feature Muller's arrangements, "Do It ('Til You're Satisfied)" and "Express", became major hits and club favourites, and Muller's innovative arrangements helped the songs pioneer disco music. The success of B.T. Express inspired United Artists Records to sign Brass Construction, while Muller, studying music theory at Hunter College, concurrently achieved a degree in musical arrangement. In assignments on musical counterpoints, he used some of the arrangements he had written for the Brass Construction album, including that of "Changin'," which features "all these displacements where a phrase is shifted over a bar," as he described in an interview with Wax Poetics.

Brass Construction was produced by Lane and recorded at Ultra-Sonic Studios in Hempstead and N.Y. Groove Studios in New York City. The group compiled a list of the twelve best songs they could record for the album and then used half of them, with several unused songs later appearing on Brass Construction II. Featuring extra vocals from sisters Delores, Bonnie and Denise Dunning, "Movin'" emerged from a studio jam session that began with Wade Williamson's bass line, before Muller gave cues to other band members, notably drummer Larry Payton. "That's why you hear some off rolls in there," the musician later explained, "since I would yell to Larry, 'Okay, let's go! Roll coming up!'". The jam lasted sixteen minutes, one entire side of tape, with Muller subsequently writing the horn parts and "Got myself together" hook, which were overdubbed. The album took three months to complete due to the band's perfectionism, which led to many minor alterations. After recording Brass Construction, the record's release was delayed while Muller provided further string arrangements for B.T. Express, among other activities.

== Composition ==
"I had to put some lyrics on the instrumentals. So, as a concept, I used verbs for all the song titles and came up with some very simple, abstract vocal chants to go with the music. Later I would hear from the fans how much these songs spoke to them–they would have a whole story for these one word songs! That's the trick for writing good songs: Let people plug in their own experiences."

—Randy Muller in an interview with Wax Poetics

All six songs on Brass Construction were written by the group, with Muller primarily responsible for five of them. A highly rhythmic album of funk and disco music, the record is dominated by the brass section, while the James Brown-influenced guitar work of Joseph Arthur Wong provides a rhythmic centre. Influences from American, African and Caribbean music, reflecting the diverse nationalities of the band members, are woven into the music. While comparisons were drawn between the disco songs on Brass Construction and B.T. Express, who Muller describes as "a solid funk band," the musician highlighted the influence of other styles of music on Brass Construction, including Latin music and jazz.

Muller originally intended the group to be instrumental, having favoured the horn sections of Kool & the Gang, Chicago and Blood, Sweat & Tears, but the group's label insisted on Muller adding lyrics, so wrote what he described as "some very simple, abstract vocal chants to go with the music." The group described the album's lyrics – the repetition of simple words – as "high abstractions", with Muller describing this as "the universal appeal of the album. We left it for other people to interpret what they wanted to." Critics note themes of positivity and social awareness in the lyrics. Continuing the simplistic approach, the titles of all six songs feature only a single verb. "It was a little bit of a concept," Muller told an interviewer, "but basically it was done for simplicity. It's appropriate, too, with our approach to our music because we are basically simple and don't want to become too complicated."

Incorporating driving polyrhythms, the lengthy disco song "Movin'" is in the tradition of the 9+ minute arrangements explored by James Brown. As the record progresses, Payton's heavy drum work dominates over Joe Wong's "chanking guitars" and the pulsating off-time bass riffs of Wade Williamson, while the horns and chanting permeate. According to author Rickey Vincent, the song was one of the final dance jams of its era to "groove on rhythm instruments," as the synthesizers appear on top of the song's groove rather than in its rhythm track. While not a ballad, "Love" features a slower tempo than the other songs, and incorporates a fanfare into its coda.

== Release and reception ==
Due to the lengthy delay that followed recording Brass Construction, the group became sceptical of releasing the album, fearing it would now sound "stale". The album was ultimately released in autumn 1975, and was advertised in the music press by United Artists with the tagline "New York Funk," saying "there's nobody who can ignore the power of the Construction." It proved to be a surprise success, peaking at number ten on the Billboard Top LPs & Tape chart, and spending three weeks at number one on the Billboard Top Soul Albums chart in May 1976, lasting thirteen weeks in the chart overall. The album was not originally released in the United Kingdom, but quickly became a very popular import, to the point where James Hamilton of Record Mirror & Disc called it "possibly the biggest-selling import album of all time." Thus, United Artists rush-released Brass Construction in the UK on March 5, 1976, and it reached number nine on the UK Albums Chart, becoming the first disco album to make the Top 10. The record also peaked at number 55 on the Canadian RPM charts. Its chart success began before the release of any singles, although "Movin'" and "Changin'" were earmarked for single release in early 1976. "Movin'" reached number 14 on the Billboard Hot 100 and, largely due to club support, number 23 on the UK Singles Chart. It also reached number one on the Hot Dance Club Play chart, while "Changin'" reached number three.

In their contemporary review, Blues & Soul described Brass Construction as "perfection" and "the funk album of all-time!" In an article on the group for the same magazine, John Abbey noted the album's success and said "it is my firm belief that they will go on to topple their stable-mates, B.T. Express, as the leading exponents of what we have come to term disco-music." Sue Byrom of Record Mirror & Disc felt that the album was "tight and fairly funky", but lamented that the tracks were similar, calling it "[s]olid disco music certainly but on this hearing not destined for much else." At the 19th Grammy Awards in 1976, Brass Construction was nominated for Best R&B Instrumental Performance. The album is certified Platinum by the Recording Industry Association of America for 1,000,000 sales and Silver by the British Phonographic Industry for monetary revenue of £100,000. The group hoped to tour the UK in 1976 after the college terms of all nine members finished, but ran into difficulties when making their applications for travel as Muller realised his mother did not register him as an American citizen when his family settled there from Guyana, fearing if he left the US he may not have been allowed to re-enter. The group did not tour the UK until promoting Brass Construction II in 1977.

== Retrospective assessment and legacy ==
Professional ratings
Review scores
Source	Rating
AllMusic	4/5 stars
Christgau's Record Guide	B+
Funk (Dave Thompson)	9/10
Funk (Rickey Vincent)	4/5 stars
The Rolling Stone Record Guide	4/5 stars
The Virgin Encyclopedia of Seventies Music	3/5 stars

Brass Construction established the group as one of the leading exponents of jazz-oriented funk. The album has since become regarded as a landmark in funk music and proved influential, particularly on the Britfunk scene of the late 1970s and early 1980s, with bands like Hi-Tension, Light of the World, Incognito and Level 42. The band's music, particularly "Movin'", also became popular at influential northern soul nightclub Blackpool Mecca in the late 1970s, where the introduction of jazz-funk helped bring a new audience. According to DJ Kev Roberts, "Movin'" was the song that "brought in a different level of person altogether", calling it "a funkier groove" and "a new tempo for people north of Watford to get into."

In Christgau's Record Guide (1981), Robert Christgau described Brass Construction as a "black-identified" disco band "with lots of funk" and said the album "owes more lyrically to Gil Scott-Heron than to Barry White but evokes both and is candid to the point of wryness (and terseness) about using words primarily for musical color," giving praise to "the way the synthesized violins are timed." In a retrospective review, Craig Lytle of AllMusic made note of "the album's dance/funk appeal," describing the horn-centred music as being laden with vocals and sporadic socially aware lyrics. In his book on funk music, Vincent writes that Brass Construction "rises above commerciality and delivers a furious funk attack quotient," while in a "Classic Record" column for DJ Mag, DJ Greg Wilson wrote that, with the release of Brass Construction, the band "immediately took their place at funk's top table". He describes the album as the band's defining release: "Right from the opening brass stab this nine-piece band meant business."

The album was re-released by Soul Brother Records in 2009, alongside Brass Construction II and V, with new sleeve notes by Muller. In a review of the reissue, Micahel de Koningh of Blues & Soul hailed Brass Construction as a "pretty solid piece of pre-disco funk" that "no one had heard anything like" before its original release, citing the two "jazz-fuelled disco funk" singles as "era defining". He further credited the album's style – splicing funk music with "banked brass, chattering keyboards and sweeping strings" – as laying the blueprint for the "dozens and dozens" of disco twelve-inch singles that appeared later in the 1970s. Daryl Easlea of BBC Music wrote that the "lyrically succinct and musically, monstrously funky" album startled the "soul community" in 1975, adding that the record's "mixture of driving rhythms and positive message showed there could be an alternative to disco that updated the work of Sly Stone and James Brown, while adding a new, urban flavour."

== Track listing ==
All tracks written by Randy Muller except where noted

=== Side one ===
1. "Movin'" (Muller, Wade Williamston) – 8:39
2. "Peekin'" (Alexander) – 3:55
3. "Changin'" – 8:12

=== Side two ===
4. "Love" – 6:35
5. "Talkin'" – 4:02
6. "Dance" – 9:36

== Personnel ==
Adapted from the liner notes to Brass Construction

- Sandy Billups – conga, vocals
- Mickey Grudge – saxophone, vocals
- Randy Muller – percussion, arranger, keyboards, timbales, vocals
- Wayne Parris – trumpet, vocals
- Larry Payton – drums, vocals
- Morris Price – percussion, trumpet, vocals
- Jesse Ward – saxophone, vocals
- Wade Williamston – bass
- Joseph Arthur Wong – guitar
- Irving Spice – strings

== Charts ==
=== Weekly charts ===
Chart (1975–1976)	Peak position
US Billboard 200	10
US Top R&B/Hip-Hop Albums (Billboard)	1

=== Year-end charts ===
Chart (1976)	Position
US Billboard 200	12
US Top R&B/Hip-Hop Albums (Billboard)	6

=== Singles ===
Year	Single	Chart positions		
Year	Single	US	US R&B	US Dance
1976	"Changin'"	—	24	1
1976	"Movin'"	14	1	1

== See also ==
- List of number-one R&B albums of 1976 (U.S.)
