= List of Billboard number-one R&B albums of 1976 =

These are the Billboard magazine R&B albums that reached number one in 1976.

== Chart history ==
Issue date	Album	Artist
January 3	Gratitude	Earth, Wind & Fire
January 10	Gratitude	Earth, Wind & Fire
January 17	Gratitude	Earth, Wind & Fire
January 24	Wake Up Everybody	Harold Melvin & the Blue Notes
January 31	Wake Up Everybody	Harold Melvin & the Blue Notes
February 7	Gratitude	Earth, Wind & Fire
February 14	Gratitude	Earth, Wind & Fire
February 21	Gratitude	Earth, Wind & Fire
February 28	Rufus featuring Chaka Khan	Rufus featuring Chaka Khan
March 6	Rufus featuring Chaka Khan	Rufus featuring Chaka Khan
March 13	Rufus featuring Chaka Khan	Rufus featuring Chaka Khan
March 20	Rufus featuring Chaka Khan	Rufus featuring Chaka Khan
March 27	Rufus featuring Chaka Khan	Rufus featuring Chaka Khan
April 3	Rufus featuring Chaka Khan	Rufus featuring Chaka Khan
April 10	Eargasm	Johnnie Taylor
April 17	Eargasm	Johnnie Taylor
April 24	Brass Construction I	Brass Construction
May 1	Brass Construction I	Brass Construction
May 8	Brass Construction I	Brass Construction
May 15	I Want You	Marvin Gaye
May 22	Breezin'	George Benson
May 29	Look Out for #1	The Brothers Johnson
June 5	Look Out for #1	The Brothers Johnson
June 12	Look Out for #1	The Brothers Johnson
June 19	Look Out for #1	The Brothers Johnson
June 26	Harvest for the World	The Isley Brothers
July 3	Breezin'	George Benson
July 10	Breezin'	George Benson
July 17	Breezin'	George Benson
July 24	Contradiction	The Ohio Players
July 31	Sparkle	Soundtrack / Aretha Franklin
August 7	Breezin'	George Benson
August 14	Breezin'	George Benson
August 21	All Things in Time	Lou Rawls
August 28	Hot on the Tracks	The Commodores
September 4	Hot on the Tracks	The Commodores
September 11	Wild Cherry	Wild Cherry
September 18	Hot on the Tracks	The Commodores
September 25	Hot on the Tracks	The Commodores
October 2	Hot on the Tracks	The Commodores
October 9	Hot on the Tracks	The Commodores
October 16	Songs in the Key of Life	Stevie Wonder
October 23	Songs in the Key of Life	Stevie Wonder
October 30	Songs in the Key of Life	Stevie Wonder
November 6	Songs in the Key of Life	Stevie Wonder
November 13	Songs in the Key of Life	Stevie Wonder
November 20	Songs in the Key of Life	Stevie Wonder
November 27	Songs in the Key of Life	Stevie Wonder
December 4	Songs in the Key of Life	Stevie Wonder
December 11	Songs in the Key of Life	Stevie Wonder
December 18	Songs in the Key of Life	Stevie Wonder
December 25	Songs in the Key of Life	Stevie Wonder

== See also ==
- 1976 in music
- R&B number-one hits of 1976 (USA)
