= On the Loose =

On the Loose may refer to:

- On the Loose (1931 film), a comedy film produced and directed by Hal Roach
- On the Loose (1951 film), a 1951 American film
- On the Loose (1984 film), a 1984 Australian film
- On the Loose (1985 film), a Swedish film directed by Staffan Hildebrand
  - On the Loose (EP), the soundtrack to the 1985 film, recorded by the Swedish hard rock band Europe
- "On the Loose" (Niall Horan song), 2018
- "On the Loose" (Marty Rhone song), 1976
- "On the Loose", a song by Just-Ice from Gun Talk
- "On the Loose", a song by Saga from Worlds Apart
- On the Loose!, an album by British pop group Deuce
- On the Loose (outing club), an outing club for the Claremont Colleges in Claremont, California, United States
