= Lisa Armstrong =

Lisa Armstrong may refer to:

- Lisa Armstrong (writer), British author
- Lisa Armstrong (make-up artist) (born 1976), British make-up artist, actress, and singer
