= Brass Construction II =

Studio album by Brass Construction
- Released: October 29, 1976
- Recorded: September 1976
- Studios: Ultra-Sonic Recording Studios, Hempstead, New York
- Genres: Disco; funk; soul; dance
- Length: 38:39
- Label: United Artists
- Producer: Jeff Lane

Brass Construction chronology
Brass Construction (1975)	Brass Construction II (1976)	Brass Construction III (1977)

Singles from Brass Construction
- 1. "Ha Cha Cha (Funktion)" Released: 1976; 2. "What's on Your Mind (Expression)" Released: 1977

Brass Construction II is the second album by American funk-disco band Brass Construction, released in October 1976 by United Artists Records. Recorded with producer Jeff Lane, it followed the success of the group's self-titled 1975 album. Band leader Randy Muller sought to diversify the group's sound, aiming for a "multi-dimensional" approach with disparate musical influences, including styles of Latin, reggae and Afro-Cuban music, and more specific lyrical topics, with each of the songs featuring a subtitle that Muller said defined each track.

Released to a positive reception from music critics, who hailed the album's upbeat sound, Brass Construction II reached number 26 on the Billboard Top LPs & Tape chart and was certified Gold for selling 500,000 copies in the United States. The single "Hot Cha Cha (Funktion)" was a hit in the US and UK. While Muller initially was pleased with the album's sales, he later expressed how he felt the album under-performed commercially due to the album's diverse style. The album has since been credited for helping inspire the acid jazz movement, while retrospective reviews of the album have been favourable. In 2009, Brass Construction II was re-released by Soul Brother Records.

== Background and recording ==
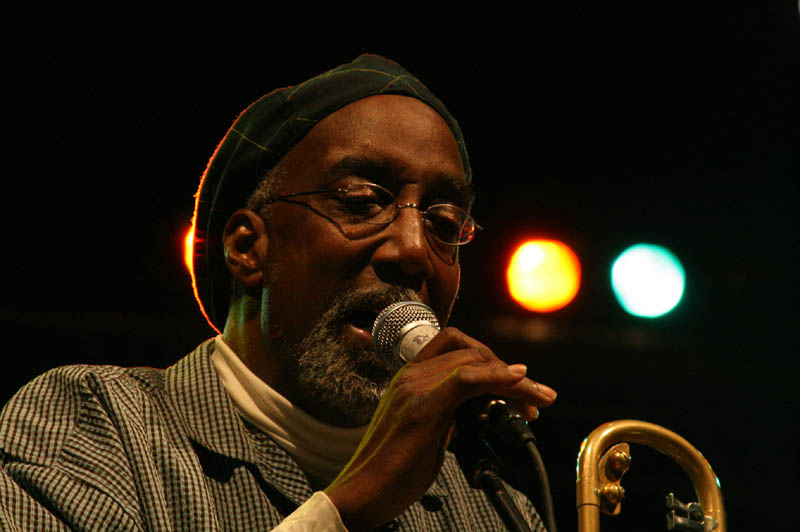
Trombonist Curtis Fowlkes (pictured 2007) contributes to the album

Funk/disco group Brass Construction, led by vocalist/instrumentalist Randy Muller, achieved Platinum success with their self-titled 1975 album, while the songs "Movin'" and "Changin'" became popular in nightclubs. They followed the release of the album with a lengthy tour, which delayed recording of Brass Construction II. Muller explained that while the material was "ready ahead of time," the group's busy schedule meant they had to wait until September 1976 to record it. The band debuted the song "Ha Cha Cha (Funktion)" in concert long before it was recorded. Wishing to diversify the band's sound, Muller included a Spanish-language chant in the song, "Vamanos, ha-cha-cha!", having been inspired by different ethnic music while growing up in Guyana. Finding that audiences enjoyed the song due to the "little theme that they could shout," the group recorded the song for the album with the chant included.

The group's manager Jeff Lane produced the album, which was recorded in Ultra-Sonic Recording Studios in New York City, while Muller wrote and arranged all the songs, although the group operated democratically with all members having a say in the execution. Some of the songs used were originally recorded for the first album but went unused, and were "dusted off a bit" for the new record. According to Muller, Brass Construction II was a "positive step towards fulfilling our goals". Having gained "the attention of people" with their debut record, the second album "was particularly important for us because we had to prove ourselves, show that we could maintain what we'd done with the first one and yet still expand." The Irving Spice Boys perform the strings on the album, while trombone was provided by Curtis Fowlkes.

== Composition ==
"All of our songs were statement songs. Basically we only had to chant something like six words and then you read between the lines. You could take it to whatever was happening in your life at that time. [...] A song like 'What's on Your Mind,' that could mean saying what's on your mind to your woman, to your boss, one of your friends who you have to say something to. We left it open for a person to use it for whatever he wanted it to do."

— Morris Price

For Brass Construction II, Muller stirred the band into a wider musical direction. Similarly to their first album, it features a funk-oriented disco sound with prominent horns, driving rhythms and hand-clapping, with songs retaining their upbeat nature by avoiding quiet moments, but it departs from the group's earlier record by adopting more musical styles, including the rhythms of Latin and Afro-Cuban music, and incorporating some mellow songs. Music critic Davitt Sigerson felt the album moved the band closer to the "rock-soul" of the Commodores, Ohio Players and Earth, Wind & Fire, and described the band's performance as a "heavy duty rhythm section," avoiding horn solos.

The group sought a "multi-dimensional" approach, fusing disparate musical styles throughout the record, with Muller writing each song with a specific meaning and message. While the lyrics of the first Brass Construction album centred on the repetition of simple words, leaving audiences to interpret the songs as they wished, Brass Construction II features more lyrical work; Muller felt the album "gets closer to what we want to say" and said: "I tend to write in a simple way so that we can get over to the maximum number of people with our work." Each of the song names features a word in parentheses; Muller explained that these words "define each song," adding that he chose the name "Funktion" – suffixing "Ha Cha Cha" on side one – as a way to "bring out the humorous aspects of life. But the songs on that side are more serious."

"Ha Cha Cha" is a largely instrumental piece with a double-time tempo and a more layered sound than the group's previous material, densely weaving horn and string lines. "Get to the Point" features deep vocalising reminiscent of B.T. Express. A heavy funk song with a tempo that matches "Changin'," "Sambo" was described by Muller as "more or less about the black struggle" and how black people have "come a long, long way through it all." While Muller conceded that "Screwed" carries a sexual connotation, he said the song itself regards "the way we get disappointed and messed around with," citing "when we elect a government that says they'll do one thing and turn around and do something else." Featuring themes of social awareness, "The Message" was compared by writer Davitt Sigerson to Earth, Wind & Fire's "Reasons", and highlights an archaic piano part from Muller with Joseph Arthur Wong's varied guitar licks. An example of the group's genre fusions, "Blame It On Me" mixes reggae and country, and has been highlighted for its Caribbean style and jazz stylings. "Now Is Tomorrow" warns of procrastination and urges listeners to avoid it, and features a pulsating rhythm played with a Fender Rhodes organ, interplaying guitars and flute, and plucked strings.

== Release and promotion ==
Brass Construction II was released by United Artists Records on October 29, 1976. Hoping to achieve crossover success, the label promoted the album with heavy merchandising while the band continued their continuous touring. In the United States, the album reached number 26 on the Billboard Top LPs & Tape chart and number nine on the Top Soul Albums chart, but did not reach the UK Albums Chart. The record was certified Gold by the Recording Industry Association of America (RIAA) for 500,000 sales. In 1977, "Ha Cha Cha (Funktion)" reached number 51 on the Billboard Hot 100 and number 37 on the UK Singles Chart, while "The Message (Inspirational)" and "What's on Your Mind (Expression)", released together as a single, charted separately at numbers 42 and 69 respectively on the Hot Soul Singles. Author Marc Taylor said that despite "the relatively poor chart performance" of the two songs, this "was not a true indicator of the band's popularity. Brass Construction focused on being a good album group as opposed to concentrating on three-minute singles."

Upon release, the record saw competition with Mass Production's debut album, Welcome to Our World, which—according to journalist James Hamilton—rivalled Brass Construction II for "DJs' affections", with many funk fans preferring the Mass Production album for it sounding "more the way they thought the new Brass Construction set would." The two albums also have similar covers, depicting the groups in custom-tailored "funk wear", with each member in leather outfits of different colours adorned with appliqués. Muller said of Mass Production's sound: "Sure, it might be a kind of rip off but we take that as a compliment. It means that we created something new and others are now following and that makes us innovators."

To celebrate Brass Construction's success, a party was held at the St. Moritz nightclub in New York City in January 1977; boxer and singer Joe Frazier, wearing a shimmering robe, sang at the event. In an interview with Blues & Soul conduced a month earlier, Muller said he felt that the album's sales proved the public had accepted the record regardless of it being more varied than the first Brass Construction album. However, by May 1977 he changed his stance, telling an interviewer of the same publication that, while the group were pleased with Brass Construction II, the album "did not sell so well" because it "didn't have the drive, the power of side one on the first album. It wasn't that insistent beat pounding out throughout and that's what the people seem to want," expressing reservations that the album was too varied for audiences and vowing to appease audiences with their third record.

== Critical reception and legacy ==
Professional ratings
Review scores
Source	Rating
AllMusic	3/5 stars
Black Music	4/5 stars
Funk (Dave Thompson)	6/10
Funk (Rickey Vincent)	4/5 stars
The Virgin Encyclopedia of Seventies Music	2/5 stars

In a contemporary review, Billboard highlighted Brass Construction II as a "Top Album Pick", and praised the group for balancing their "funky and raunchy" sound with "smooth and mellow" moments, saying that the album "offers equal parts vocals and instrumentals and both are of high quality." Reviewing it alongside the Mass Production album, James Hamilton of Record Mirror said that only two songs on Brass Construction II are "dancers" that maintain the intensity of their debut – "Ha Cha Cha", which he compared to "Movin'", and "Sambo" – but conceded that both albums "are equally good and funky." Davitt Sigerson of Black Music considered Brass Construction II superior to their previous album, and while feeling the group would benefit from "a more consistent vocal personality," he praised the "bass-guitar keyboard triumvirate" as "the equal of any band around" and hailed Wong's rhythm guitar work for being as compulsive as that of fellow funk guitarists Claydes Smith and Bobby Eli.

Reviewing the album retrospectively, Ed Hogan of AllMusic praised the "swirling, almost tipsy feel" to the Irving Spice strings on "Screwed," while feeling "The Message" is "almost inspirational in its theme." In their books on funk music, Rickey Vincent praised the album for being "even more surprisingly diverse and original" than the first Brass Construction record, while Dave Thompson praised "Ha Cha Cha (Funktion)", which he called a "delirious" funk chant reminiscent of "Movin'", but believed that elsewhere, Brass Construction II "sags like the morning after a really great party, which, in a way, it was." He contended that the album was never likely to "eclipse the majesty" of the band's debut record.

The album influenced the acid jazz genre of the 1990s. Furthermore, "What's on Your Mind (Expression)" became sample material for numerous hip hop producers in the 1980s and 1990s. Brass Construction II was re-released by Soul Brother Records in 2009, alongside the group's first and fifth albums. In a review of the reissues, Micahel de Koningh of Blues & Soul writes that although the record "did not have the slap-bang impact" of the group's innovative debut album, it nonetheless retained the group's energetic groove, with "Ha Cha Cha" being "a particularly fine dancer." On 17 September 2014, Trevor Nelson made Brass Construction II the "Album of the Week" on his BBC Radio 2 show.

== Track listing ==
All tracks written by Randy Muller except where noted

=== Side one ===
1. "Ha Cha Cha (Funktion)" – 5:51
2. "Get to the Point (Summation)" – 4:18
3. "Sambo (Progression)" – 5:18
4. "Screwed (Conditions)" – 5:47

=== Side two ===
5. "The Message (Inspiration)" – 4:42
6. "Now Is Tomorrow (Anticipation)" – 5:55
7. "Blame It On Me (Introspection)" – 3:20
8. "What's on Your Mind (Expression)" (Muller, Joe Wong, Larry Payton, Wade Williamston, Wayne Parris) – 3:24

== Personnel ==
Adapted from the liner notes to Brass Construction II

- Randy Muller – writing, arrangement
- Sid Maurer – art direction
- Anna Novikoff – album design
- John Bradley – engineer
- Jeff Lane – production
- Don Hunstein – photography
- The Irving Spice Boys – strings
- Curtis Fowlkes – trombone

== Charts ==
=== Weekly charts ===
Chart (1976)	Peak position
US Billboard 200	26
US Top R&B/Hip-Hop Albums (Billboard)	3

=== Year-end charts ===
Chart (1977)	Position
US Top R&B/Hip-Hop Albums (Billboard)	28
