= Call It Love (Deuce song) =

Single by Deuce

from the album On the Loose!
- Released: 9 January 1995
- Genre: Eurodance; Europop; handbag house
- Length: 4:04
- Label: London
- Songwriters: Ian Curnow; Phil Harding; Tom Watkins
- Producer: Rob Kean

Deuce singles chronology
"Call It Love" (1995)	"I Need You" (1995)

Music video
- "Call It Love" on YouTube

"Call It Love" is a song by British pop group Deuce, released in January 1995 by London Records as the debut single from the group's only album, On the Loose! (1995). The song is written by Ian Curnow, Phil Harding and Tom Watkins, and produced by Rob Kean. It was a sizeable hit in Europe, peaking at number eleven in the UK and number fourteen in Ireland. Its accompanying music video features the group performing at an art gallery and also features a cameo by Tony Mortimer from East 17. It was a Box Top on British music television channel The Box from March 1995.

== Critical reception ==
British columnist James Masterton named the song a "catchy slice of European pop" and complimented it as "easily one of the best pop records on the chart at the moment." Pan-European magazine Music & Media noted, "A big hit on British turf, Deuce's ace is finally hitting the Continent's baseline." Music & Media editor Maria Jimenez described it as "slick Eurodance", complimenting it as a high quality track of its dance sub-genre. A reviewer from Music Week remarked that the group had "already being described by London as 'a new Bucks Fizz'" and described the song as "Europop with a looser feel." Mark Sutherland from NME praised "the glacial handbag perfection". James Hamilton from the Record Mirror Dance Update described the song as "ABBA-ishly sung cantering" in his weekly dance column DJ directory. In a 2014 retrospective review, Pop Rescue named it a "perfect pop gem".

== Track listing ==
- 12", UK (1994)
1. "Call It Love" (JX Kissy Kissy Mix)
2. "Call It Love" (Diss-Cuss Moris Or Doris Mix)
3. "Call It Love" (Movin' Melodies Spank Mix)
4. "Call It Love" (Primax One Night Stand Mix)
- CD single, UK (1994)
1. "Call It Love" (Teen Sparkle Mix) — 4:04
2. "Call It Love" (J-X Kissy Kissy Mix) — 7:11
3. "Call It Love" (Movin' Melodies Spank Mix) — 6:27
4. "Call It Love" (J-PAC Youth Yob Mix) — 4:39
5. "Call It Love" (Primax One Night Stand Mix) — 5:54
- CD maxi, Europe (1994)
1. "Call It Love" (Teen Sparkle Mix) — 4:02
2. "Call It Love" (J-X Kissy Kissy Mix) — 7:12
3. "Call It Love" (Movin' Melodies Spank Mix) — 6:28
4. "Call It Love" (J-PAC Youth Yob Mix) — 4:39

== Charts ==
=== Weekly charts ===
Chart (1995)	Peak position
Europe (Eurochart Hot 100)	28
Europe (European Dance Radio)	6
Europe (European Hit Radio)	37
Ireland (IRMA)	14
Israel (Israeli Singles Chart)	1
Scotland (OCC)	7
UK Singles (OCC)	11
UK Dance (OCC)	5
UK Airplay (Music Week)	14
UK Club Chart (Music Week)	29
UK Pop Tip Club Chart (Music Week)	24

=== Year-end charts ===
Chart (1995)	Position
Israel (Israeli Singles Chart)	47
UK Singles (OCC)	90
