= On the Bible =

Single by Deuce

from the album On the Loose!
- Released: 7 August 1995
- Length: 4:35
- Label: London
- Songwriters: Phil Harding, Ian Curnow, Rob Kean
- Producers: Phil Harding, Ian Curnow, Rob Kean

Deuce singles chronology
"I Need You" (1995)	"On the Bible" (1995)	"No Surrender" (1996)

"On the Bible" is a song by English musical group Deuce. It was released in the United Kingdom in August 1995.

== Track listings ==
UK single (London Records – LONCD368)

1. "On the Bible" (radio edit) – 4:45
2. "On the Bible" (Franco And Grimm remix) – 5:54
3. "On the Bible" (Kenny C remix) – 8:54
4. "On the Bible" (Lazonby Secular Perversion) – 8:32

Australian single (Central Station – CSR CD5 0154)

1. "On the Bible" (radio edit) – 4:45
2. "On the Bible" (TV edit) – 3:30
3. "On the Bible" (Wand 7-inch edit) – 3:55
4. "On the Bible" (Wand 12-inch remix) – 7:49
5. "On the Bible" (Kenny C remix) – 8:54
6. "On the Bible" (Lazonby Secular Perversion) – 8:32

== Charts ==
Chart (1995–1997)	Peak position
Australia (ARIA)	27
Iceland (Íslenski Listinn Topp 40)	24
UK Singles (OCC)	13
