= On the Loose! =

Studio album by Deuce
- Released: 28 August 1995
- Recorded: 1995
- Genre: Pop
- Length: 46:20
- Label: London
- Producers: Phil Harding; Ian Curnow; Rob Kean

Singles from On the Loose!
- 1. "Call It Love"; 2. "I Need You"; 3. "On the Bible"

Professional ratings
Review scores
Source	Rating
NME	8/10
Smash Hits	5/5 stars

On the Loose! is the only studio album by British pop group Deuce, released in 1995 by London Records. The album includes the singles "Call It Love", "I Need You" and "On the Bible". It peaked at number 18 in the UK Albums Chart.

In Australia, a 2-disc version of the album was released in 1997 which includes the single "No Surrender" added to the original track listing on disc 1 and remixes on disc 2.

== Critical reception ==
Mark Sutherland from NME wrote, "From the brazen stomp of Eurovision miss (but chart hit) 'I Need You' to the lush Pet Shop Boys epic, that is current chart monster 'On the Bible' to the glacial handbag perfection of 'Call It Love' to the supremely weepy 'Call It a Day', Deuce take on every genre the charts have to offer and master them all without breaking sweat. Just as well too — perspiration would play havoc with their make up. Advantage pop." Siân Pattenden from Smash Hits gave the album a top score of five out of five, adding, "Choc 'n' sweets-full of smashing tunes, including all three singles to date, On the Loose is a non-stop dodgem car of pop brightness. Boogie to the rollicking 'Be What U Wanna Be' and 'Boyfriend Girlfriend'. Blub at 'I Was Wrong' and say "Cor!" as you fall over with the Shampoo-ness of 'Kiss It'. Then put it on again because it's got more pop than several cans of Tango. Deuce, er, obviously have the juice. Fantastically brilliant! Hurray!"

== Track listing ==
All tracks written by Phil Harding, Ian Curnow and Rob Kean, except where noted.

Standard album
No.	Title	Writer(s)	Length
1.	"Call It Love"		4:01
2.	"On the Bible"		4:43
3.	"Talk to Me"		4:12
4.	"Be What You Wanna Be"		4:25
5.	"Rumours"		3:33
6.	"Let's Call It a Day"	Harding; Curnow; Kean; Paul Holmes	4:59
7.	"I Need You"	Harding; Curnow; Kean; Tom Watkins	2:52
8.	"Boyfriend Girlfriend"		4:09
9.	"I'll Be There for You"	Harding; Curnow; Kean; Kelly O'Keefe	4:19
10.	"I Was Wrong"		3:03
11.	"Kiss It"	Harding; Curnow; Kean; Lisa Armstrong; Craig Young	5:54

== Personnel ==
Adapted from the album's liner notes.

Deuce

- Kelly O'Keefe – vocals
- Lisa Armstrong – vocals
- Craig Young – vocals
- Paul Holmes – vocals

Other musicians

- Tracy Ackerman – backing vocals (tracks 1, 3–5, 7, 8, 10)
- Trevor Connor – backing vocals (tracks 3, 7, 8, 10)
- Tee Green – backing vocals (tracks 4–6, 9, 11)
- The Vocal Assassins (led by Bazil Mead) – choir (track 2)

Production

- Phil Harding – producer
- Ian Curnow – producer
- Rob Kean – producer
- Julian Gallagher – assistant
- Recorded at the CHAPS Studio and the Strongroom
- Simon Fowler – photography
- Design and art direction by Form
