= Deuce (band) =

British pop group (1994–1997)

- Origin: United Kingdom
- Genres: Pop, dance-pop, Eurodance
- Years active: 1994–1997
- Labels: London, Love This
- Past members: Kelly O'Keefe; Lisa Armstrong; Craig Robert Young; Paul Holmes; Amanda Perkins

Deuce were a British pop group that found moderate success in the mid-1990s. A two-male, two-female quartet, they released four top-30 singles in the UK charts during 1995 and 1996, before splitting up in 1997.

== Career ==
The band was formed in 1994 by Tom Watkins, who had managed the Pet Shop Boys, 2wo Third3, Bros and East 17; and Kelly O'Keefe who was doing work experience in his office. He admired her distinctive vocals, style and kitsch sensibility, and they decided to put together a boy/girl band with O'Keefe as lead vocalist. O'Keefe was a student of The BRIT School, studying music, and recruited her school friend Lisa Armstrong, a dancer. Watkins then discovered Craig Robert Young. The original line-up featured a male member named Ashley who was quickly replaced by Paul Holmes and at this point the group were fully formed.

Their debut single, "Call It Love", entered the UK Singles Chart at number 21 on 21 January 1995 and climbed to a peak of number 11. The follow-up "I Need You" was entered into the UK's pre-selection show for the Eurovision Song Contest but came third (the selected entry was by Love City Groove). The single went straight to number 10 on release in April 1995. One further single, "On the Bible", reached number 13 in August, and the album On the Loose! charted at number 18 in the UK Albums Chart. A fourth single, "Let's Call It a Day", was scheduled for release in November, but was cancelled after O'Keefe decided to leave the group, although a live performance of the song was screened as part of CITV's 40 years of TV celebration in December 1995, with the band dressed in black evening wear.

The band appeared on the charity single "The Gift of Christmas" as part of Child Liners, which also featured Peter Andre, MN8, Ultimate Kaos, East 17, Dannii Minogue, C.J. Lewis, Boyzone, and Michelle Gayle. The single reached number 9 in the UK and number 10 in Ireland, and profits went to the British charity Childline. Deuce also sang on the Coronation Street anniversary album, performing a track called "Life on the Street", featuring actress Sherrie Hewson.

Following O'Keefe's departure in November 1995, the band was dropped by London Records. A single called "Rock the Disco" had been planned for release in 1996, and it was finally leaked on the internet in January 2007. The group wanted to continue and signed to Mike Stock's Love This label. O'Keefe was replaced by dancer Amanda Perkins and a new single called "No Surrender" was released in July 1996. It was not as successful as previous releases, charting at only number 29. The group was then launched, minus Young, in Australia, where "On the Bible" was a moderate hit in late 1996, and was followed by a dance remix of "No Surrender" in April 1997, which peaked outside the top 100. TV performances of this track saw Craig Young replaced by a new member named Clinton, after Young opted not to travel to Australia. Shortly after this, Deuce disbanded, although not before an Australian double CD version of their British album On the Loose! was released, including "No Surrender" and a remix disc featuring a half-hour megamix.

Young went on to pursue his acting career, appearing in Much Ado About Nothing at the Queen's Theatre. He also appeared regularly on MTV UK including stints as a presenter of Select, the UK Top Ten Countdown and Watch Out For GMTV. He then secured a role as Alex Wilkinson in the long-running football soap Dream Team. Other appearances include Lost, MTV's Spyder Games, Charmed, Sabrina The Teenage Witch and The District. He created Just for Kicks on Nickelodeon. Armstrong is now a make-up artist and ex-wife of Ant McPartlin, whom she married on 22 July 2006 and divorced on 16 October 2018. Holmes went on to write songs for many international pop artists, including Robin Gibb.

In 2017, 22 years after the original release, On the Loose! was digitally re-issued.

== Discography ==
=== Albums ===
- On the Loose! (1995) – UK No. 18

=== Singles ===
Year	Single	Peak positions				Album
Year	Single	UK	AUS	IRE	ISR	Album
1995	"Call It Love"	11	—	14	1	On the Loose!
1995	"I Need You"	10	—	14	2	On the Loose!
1995	"On the Bible"	13	27	—	2	On the Loose!
1996	"No Surrender"	29	115	—	—	non-album single
"—" denotes releases that did not chart or were not released.
