= Brass Construction =

American funk group

- Origin: Brooklyn, New York, United States
- Genres: Funk, disco
- Years active: 1968–1985
- Labels: United Artists Records, Capitol Records, Epic Records
- Past members: Wade Williamston; Sandy Billups; Morris Price; Larry Payton (deceased); Jesse Ward Jr. (deceased); Michael "Micky" Grudge; Wayne Parris; Alvin Haskin; Duane Cahill; Joseph Arthur-Wong (deceased); Randy Muller
- Website: Official website

Brass Construction was an American funk group formed in Brooklyn, New York, United States, in 1968. They were originally known as Dynamic Soul, and went on to record a string of hit singles and albums through 1985.

== Career ==
Signed in 1975 by Sid Maurer, and former United Artists Records promotion man Fred Frank, they scored two US Billboard Hot 100 entries in 1976, the most successful being "Movin'," which hit No. 14. They had much more success on the US Hot Dance Club Play chart, with nine chart entries, including "Movin'", which reached No. 1. Singer, pianist, flautist and arranger Randy Muller went on to score a number of R&B hits with Skyy and B. T. Express.

Over the years, Brass Construction members have included Wade Williamston (bass), Sandy Billups (percussion), Morris Price (trumpet), Larry Payton (drums), Jesse Ward Jr. (saxophone), Michael "Micky" Grudge (saxophone), Wayne Parris (trumpet), Alvin Haskin (original trombone player on "Movin'"), Duane Cahill (trombone), Joseph Arthur-Wong (guitar), and Randy Muller (lead vocals), later joined by Lee Evans on keyboards.

Brass Construction reunited for a concert on November 28, 2005, at the Bataclan Arena in Paris, France.

Joseph Arthur-Wong died in 1998. Jesse Ward Jr. died in 2016. Drummer Larry Payton died on March 21, 2016.

== Discography ==
=== Studio albums ===
Year	Title	Peak chart positions				Certifications	Record label
Year	Title	US	US R&B	CAN	UK	Certifications	Record label
1975	Brass Construction	10	1	55	9	RIAA: Platinum; BPI: Silver	United Artists
1976	Brass Construction II	26	3	—	—	RIAA: Gold	United Artists
1977	Brass Construction III	66	16	—	—	RIAA: Gold	United Artists
1978	Brass Construction IV	174	24	—	—		United Artists
1979	Brass Construction 5	89	18	—	—		United Artists
1980	Brass Construction 6	121	32	—	—		United Artists
1982	Attitudes	114	21	—	—		Liberty
1983	Conversations	176	29	—	—		Capitol
1984	Renegades	—	31	—	94		Capitol
1985	Conquest	—	—	—	—		Capitol
"—" denotes a recording that did not chart or was not released in that territory.

=== Compilation albums ===
- Golden Classics (1991, Collectables)
- The Best of Brass Construction: Movin' & Changin' (1993, EMI)
- Get Up to Get Down: Brass Construction's Funky Feeling (1997, Capitol)
- Classic Masters (2002, EMI/Capitol)
- Something for the Weekend: 10 Extended Soul Weekender Classics (2006, Stateside)

=== Singles ===
Year	Title	Peak chart positions							
Year	Title	US	US R&B	US Dan	BEL	CAN	NLD	NZ	UK
1970	"Two Timin' Lady"	—	—	—	—	—	—	—	—
1976	"Movin'"	14	1	1	20	47	10	—	23
1976	"Changin'"	—	24	1	—	—	—	—	—
1976	"Ha Cha Cha (Funktion)"	51	8	14	—	—	—	—	37
1977	"The Message (Inspirational)"	—	42	—	—	—	—	—	—
1977	"What's on Your Mind (Expression)"	—	69	—	—	—	—	—	—
1977	"We" / "Celebrate"	—	—	37	—	—	—	—	—
1978	"L-O-V-E-U"	104	18	—	—	—	—	—	—
1978	"Celebrate"	—	77	—	—	—	—	—	—
1978	"Help Yourself"	—	58	—	—	—	—	—	—
1978	"Get Up"	—	56	—	—	—	—	—	—
1979	"Right Place"	—	41	74	—	—	—	—	—
1980	"Music Makes You Feel Like Dancing"	—	—	—	—	—	—	—	39
1980	"I'm Not Gonna Stop"	—	—	—	—	—	—	—	—
1980	"How Do You Do (What You Do to Me)"	—	71	—	—	—	—	—	—
1982	"Can You See the Light"	—	23	64	—	—	—	—	—
1982	"Attitude"	—	59	—	—	—	—	—	—
1983	"Walkin' the Line"	—	28	17	—	—	—	—	47
1983	"We Can Work It Out"	—	—	—	—	—	—	—	70
1984	"Never Had a Girl"	—	38	—	—	—	—	—	—
1984	"Partyline"	—	53	—	—	—	—	—	56
1984	"International"	—	—	—	—	—	—	—	70
1985	"Give and Take"	—	76	28	—	—	—	—	62
1988	"Movin' 1988"	—	—	50	—	—	—	41	24
1988	"Ha Cha Cha" (re-release)	—	—	—	—	—	—	—	94
"—" denotes a recording that did not chart or was not released in that territory.

== Band members ==
- Randy Muller – Keyboards/ Lead vocals
- Wade Williamston – Bass
- Joseph Arthur-Wong (d.1998) – Guitar
- Larry Payton (1955 – March 21, 2016) – Drums
- Jesse Ward Jr. (d.2016) – Saxophone
- Michael "Micky" Grudge – Saxophone
- Wayne Parris – Trumpet
- Morris Price – Trumpet
- Sandy Billups – Percussion

== See also ==
- List of Billboard number-one dance club songs
- List of artists who reached number one on the U.S. Dance Club Songs chart
