= Rickey Vincent =

American historian

Rickey Vincent is an American author, historian, and radio host. He is based in the San Francisco Bay Area. Vincent is the author of Funk: The Music, the People and the Rhythm of The One (St. Martin's Press, 1996), which encompasses the history of funk music, and won the ASCAP Foundation Deems Taylor Award for Music Writing in 1997. He also authored another book titled: PARTY MUSIC: The Inside Story of the Black Panthers Band and How Black Power Transformed Soul Music (Lawrence Hill Books, 2013), which details the role the Civil Rights Movement had on transforming Soul Music into something more than music.

Vincent grew up in Berkeley, California, and saw funk and soul bands play in the Oakland Coliseum in the 1970s. He obtained a Master of Arts in Ethnic Studies at San Francisco State University in 1987 and a Ph.D. in Ethnic Studies at UC Berkeley in 2008. He is a lecturer at Berkeley, City College of San Francisco, San Francisco State University and California College of the Arts in Oakland. Vincent has hosted the KPFA radio program "The History of Funk" since 1997. In 2001, HUSH concerts founded the San Francisco Funk Festival based upon Vincent's academic work to place the musical genre in a societal and artistic context.

Vincent has appeared on television documentaries involving black music and culture, including multiple episodes of Unsung. In 2013, Vincent released his second book, Party Music: The Inside Story of the Black Panthers Band and How Black Power Transformed Soul Music (Chicago Review Press 2013).
