= Movin' (Brass Construction song) =

Single by Brass Construction

from the album Brass Construction
- B-side: "Talkin'"
- Released: March 1976
- Genre: Disco; R&B; funk
- Length: 3:49 (radio edit); 8:40 (full version)
- Label: United Artists
- Songwriters: Randy Muller; Wade Williamston
- Producer: Jeff Lane

Brass Construction singles chronology
"Movin'" (1976)	"Changin'" (1976)

"Movin'" is a song written by Randy Muller and Wade Williamston, and performed by R&B/disco band Brass Construction.

== Background ==
The song was culled together from a 16-minute jam session by the band.

== Chart performance ==
Released from their self-titled 1976 album, the single spent a week at number 1 on the R&B singles chart in the spring of that year. It was also successful on the pop charts, peaking at number 14 on the Billboard Hot 100. On the disco dance charts, "Movin'" went to number 1 for four weeks and spent a total of twelve weeks on the chart. Outside the US, "Movin'" went to number 23 in the UK in 1976 and peaked at number 24 as "Movin' 1988" when remixed by PWL's Phil Harding.

== Samples ==
- "Got Myself Together" by Kenny "Dope" Gonzalez sampled the song for The Bucketheads' album All in the Mind.
- Pumps and a Bump by MC Hammer.
- "Can't Let Her Get Away" by Michael Jackson.

== Popular culture ==
- The song is heard playing in the background in the Good Times episode "The Big Move", Part One, at the Evans' going-away party, where they receive the news that the family patriarch, James, had been killed in an automobile accident.
