= Lisa Armstrong (make-up artist) =

British vocalist and make-up artist (born 1976)

- Born: Lisa Marie Armstrong; 25 October 1976 (age 50); Oxford, Oxfordshire, England
- Occupations: Make-up artist, actress, singer
- Years active: 1994–present
- Spouse: Ant McPartlin (m. 2006; div. 2018)

Lisa Marie Armstrong (born 25 October 1976) is an English make-up artist, actress and singer. She was a member of pop band Deuce and served as a make-up artist for the ITV programme This Morning, until becoming make-up supervisor for the ITV quiz show Pick Me and ITV prime-time entertainment series Ant & Dec's Saturday Night Takeaway. She is now head of make-up on Strictly Come Dancing.

== Early life ==
Armstrong was born and brought up in Blackbird Leys, Oxford, England, living with her parents and one older brother Stephen. She attended Peers School, Oxford, but at the age of 14 won a place at BRIT School for Performing Arts & Technology in Croydon, south London.

== Career ==
Armstrong started her career as a dancer from an early age but when her friend, Kelly O'Keefe had work experience with a music management company and was asked to put together a group, she joined Deuce alongside Kelly O'Keefe, Craig Young and Paul Holmes. Their debut single, "Call It Love" was released in January 1995 and peaked at number 11 on the UK charts. The group went on to release two more singles and an album before O'Keefe decided to leave the group in November 1995 and the group were dropped from their label. The group decided to continue on a new label and O'Keefe was replaced by Amanda Perkins, for one single, before they disbanded.

She then chose to train as a make-up artist, writing a column for Cosmopolitan magazine before becoming the make-up artist for many British television shows such as The X Factor, Britain's Got Talent and many of Ant & Dec's shows. Armstrong was also the make-up expert on This Morning, giving makeovers and short make-up tutorials. She is now head of make-up and hair for BBC One's Strictly Come Dancing.

In 2020, she was one of the Guest Judges on make up competition show Glow Up: Britain's Next Make-Up Star on Series 2, Episode 6.

== Personal life ==
From 22 July 2006 to January 2018, Armstrong was married to television presenter Ant McPartlin. They were married at Cliveden, a country house hotel in Buckinghamshire. The couple announced in January 2018 that they were divorcing.
