= The O'Jays discography =

- Studio albums: 29
- Live albums: 1
- Compilation albums: 20
- Singles: 92

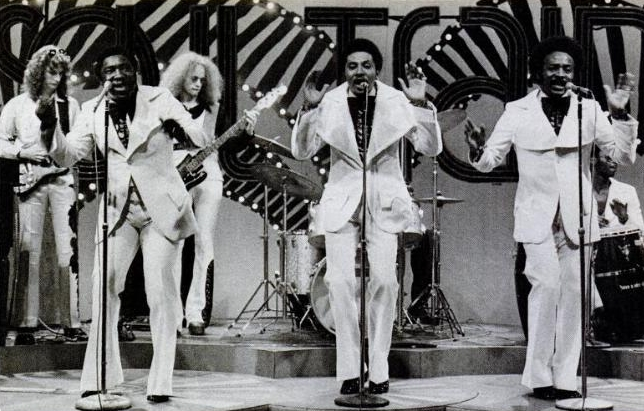
The O’Jays performing on the television program Soul Train

Following is the discography of American R&B/soul vocal group The O'Jays.

== Albums ==
=== Studio albums ===
Year	Album	Peak chart positions				Certifications	Record label
Year	Album	US	US R&B	AUS	CAN	Certifications	Record label
1965	Comin' Through	—	—	—	—		Imperial
1967	Soul Sounds	—	—	—	—		Minit
1968	Back on Top	—	—	—	—		Bell
1970	In Philadelphia	156	37	—	—		Neptune
1971	Super Bad	—	—	—	—		Trip
1972	Back Stabbers	10	3	—	49	RIAA: Gold	Philadelphia International
1973	Ship Ahoy	11	1	—	36	RIAA: Platinum	Philadelphia International
1975	Survival	11	1	91	41	RIAA: Gold	Philadelphia International
1975	Family Reunion	7	1	—	81	RIAA: Platinum	Philadelphia International
1976	Message in the Music	20	3	—	83	RIAA: Gold	Philadelphia International
1977	Travelin' at the Speed of Thought	27	6	—	—	RIAA: Gold	Philadelphia International
1978	So Full of Love	6	1	—	83	RIAA: Platinum	Philadelphia International
1979	Identify Yourself	16	3	—	—	RIAA: Platinum	Philadelphia International
1980	The Year 2000	36	6	—	—		TSOP
1982	My Favorite Person	49	7	—	—		Philadelphia International
1983	When Will I See You Again	142	19	—	—		Philadelphia International
1984	Love and More	—	35	—	—		Philadelphia International
1985	Love Fever	121	20	—	—		Philadelphia International
1987	Let Me Touch You	66	3	—	—		Philadelphia International
1989	Serious	114	4	—	—		EMI America
1991	Emotionally Yours	73	2	—	—	RIAA: Gold	EMI America
1991	Home for Christmas	—	78	—	—		EMI America
1993	Heartbreaker	75	7	—	—		EMI America
1997	Love You to Tears	75	14	—	—		Volcano
2001	For the Love...	53	11	—	—		MCA
2004	Together We Are One	—	36	—	—		Philadelphia International
2004	Imagination	178	19	—	—		Sanctuary
2010	Christmas with the O'Jays	—	45	—	—		Saguaro Road
2019	The Last Word	—	26	—	—		S-Curve
"—" denotes a recording that did not chart or was not released in that territory.

=== Live albums ===
Year	Album	Peak chart positions			Certifications (sales threshold)	Record label
Year	Album	US	US R&B	CAN	Certifications (sales threshold)	Record label
1974	The O'Jays Live in London	17	2	32	RIAA: Gold	Philadelphia International

=== Compilation albums ===
Year	Album	Peak positions		Record label
Year	Album	US	US R&B	Record label
1968	Full of Soul	—	—	Sunset
1975	The O'Jays	—	52	Bell
1977	Collectors' Items	132	—	Philadelphia International
1984	Greatest Hits	—	—	Philadelphia International
1984	From the Beginning	—	—	MCA
1994	Love Train: The Best of the O'Jays	—	—	Legacy
1995	Let Me Make Love to You	—	—	Legacy
1995	Give the People What They Want	—	—	Legacy
1996	In Bed with the O'Jays: Greatest Love Songs	—	—	EMI
1998	Super Hits	—	—	Legacy
1998	The Very Best of the O'Jays	—	—	Sony Music
1999	The Best of the O'Jays: 1976–1991	—	—	The Right Stuff
1999	Ultimate Collection	—	—	Black Tulip
2001	The Best of the O'Jays	—	—	EMI
2001	The Ultimate O'Jays	—	—	Legacy
2003	Love Songs	—	—	Legacy
2003	Anthology	—	—	The Right Stuff
2005	Message in Our Music: The Best of the O'Jays	—	—	Philadelphia International
2005	The Essential O'Jays	—	—	Legacy
2006	Beautiful Ballads	—	—	Legacy
2008	Playlist: The Very Best of the O'Jays	—	—	Playlist
"—" denotes a recording that did not chart or was not released in that territory.

== Singles ==
=== The early years ===
List of singles released from 1960 to 1973
Year	Single	Peak chart positions			Album
Year	Single	US	US R&B	CAN	Album
1960	"The Story of My Heart" ^{[A]}	—	—	—	—N/a
1960	"Lonely Rain" ^{[A]}	—	—	—	—N/a
1961	"Miracles"	—	—	—	—N/a
1963	"How Does It Feel"	—	—	—	—N/a
1963	"Dream Girl"	—	—	—	—N/a
1963	"Love Is Wonderful" (with Jimmy Norman)	—	—	—	—N/a
1963	"How Does It Feel" (re-release)	—	—	—	—N/a
1963	"Lonely Drifter"	93	—	—	Comin' Through
1964	"Stand Tall"	131	—	—	Comin' Through
1964	"I'll Never Stop Loving You"	—	—	—	—N/a
1964	"You're on Top"	—	—	—	—N/a
1964	"Oh, How You Hurt Me"	—	—	—	Comin' Through
1965	"Lipstick Traces (On a Cigarette)"	48	28	19	Comin' Through
1965	"I've Cried My Last Tear"	94	—	—	Comin' Through
1965	"Let It All Out"	—	28	—	Comin' Through
1965	"I'll Never Let You Go"	—	—	—	—N/a
1966	"I'll Never Forget You"	—	—	—	Soul Sounds
1966	"No Time for You"	—	—	—	Soul Sounds
1966	"Stand in for Love"	95	12	—	Soul Sounds
1966	"Lonely Drifter" (re-release)	—	—	—	Soul Sounds
1967	"Working on Your Case"	—	—	—	Soul Sounds
1967	"I'll Be Sweeter Tomorrow (Than I Was Today)"	66	8	—	Back on Top
1968	"Look Over Your Shoulder"	89	27	56	Back on Top
1968	"The Choice"	94	41	—	Back on Top
1968	"I Miss You"	—	—	—	Back on Top
1969	"Don't You Know a True Love"	—	—	—	Back on Top
1969	"One Night Affair"	68	15	—	In Philadelphia
1969	"Branded Bad"	—	41	—	In Philadelphia
1969	"Christmas Ain't Christmas New Years Ain't New Years without the One You Love"	—	—	—	—N/a
1970	"Deeper (In Love with You)"	64	21	—	In Philadelphia
1970	"Looky Looky (Look at Me Girl)"	98	17	—	In Philadelphia
1970	"Christmas Ain't Christmas New Years Ain't New Years without the One You Love" (re-release)	—	—	—	—N/a
1971	"Shattered Man"	—	—	—	Super Bad
1972	"Now He's Home"	—	—	—	Super Bad
1973	"Look Over Your Shoulder" (re-release)	—	—	—	Back on Top
1973	"Shattered Man" (re-release)	—	—	—	Super Bad
1974	"Peace"	—	65	—	Super Bad
"—" denotes a recording that did not chart or was not released in that territory.

- ^{A} Singles credited to The Mascots

=== The Philadelphia International era ===
List of singles released on the Philadelphia International label
Year	Single	Peak chart positions						Certifications	Album
Year	Single	US	US R&B	US Dan	AUS	CAN	UK	Certifications	Album
1972	"Back Stabbers"	3	1	—	92	39	14	RIAA: Gold	Back Stabbers
1972	"992 Arguments"	57	13	—	—	—	—		Back Stabbers
1973	"Love Train"	1	1	—	91	15	9	RIAA: Gold; BPI: Gold	Back Stabbers
1973	"Time to Get Down"	33	2	—	—	—	51 (Note: Chart position is from the official UK "Breakers List".)		Back Stabbers
1973	"Put Your Hands Together"	10	2	—	—	47	—		Ship Ahoy
1973	"Christmas Ain't Christmas New Years Ain't New Years without the One You Love"	—	—	—	—	—	—		—N/a
1974	"For the Love of Money"	9	3	—	—	29	52	RIAA: Gold	Ship Ahoy
1974	"Now That We Found Love"	—	—	—	—	—	55		Ship Ahoy
1974	"Sunshine (Part II)"	48	17	—	—	—	—		The O'Jays Live in London
1975	"Give the People What They Want"	45	1	—	—	67	—		Survival
1975	"Let Me Make Love to You" (A-side)	75	10	—	—	95	—		Survival
1975	"Survival" (B-side)	—	10	—	—	—	—		Survival
1975	"I Love Music (Part I)"	5	1	1	100	9	13	RIAA: Gold	Family Reunion
1975	"Christmas Ain't Christmas New Years Ain't New Years without the One You Love" (re-release)	—	—	—	—	—	—		—N/a
1976	"Livin' for the Weekend" (A-side)	20	1	—	—	44	52		Family Reunion
1976	"Stairway to Heaven" (B-side)	—	1	—	—	—	—		Family Reunion
1976	"Family Reunion"	—	45	—	—	—	—		Family Reunion
1976	"Message in Our Music"	49	1	38	—	100	54		Message in the Music
1976	"Darlin' Darlin' Baby (Sweet, Tender, Love)"	72	1	—	—	84	24		Message in the Music
1977	"Work on Me"	—	7	—	—	—	—		Travelin' at the Speed of Thought
1977	"Let's Clean Up the Ghetto" (with Philadelphia International All Stars)	91	4	26	—	—	34		Let's Clean Up the Ghetto
1978	"I Love Music" (re-release)	—	—	—	—	—	36		Survival
1978	"Use ta Be My Girl"	4	1	—	41	90	12	RIAA: Gold	So Full of Love
1978	"Brandy"	79	21	—	—	94	21		So Full of Love
1978	"Cry Together"	—	—	—	—	—	—		So Full of Love
1979	"Sing a Happy Song"	102	7	—	—	—	39		Identify Yourself
1979	"I Want You Here with Me"	—	49	—	—	—	—		Identify Yourself
1979	"Forever Mine"	28	4	—	—	—	—		Identify Yourself
1979	"Hurry Up & Come Back"	—	—	—	—	—	—		Identify Yourself
1979	"Christmas Ain't Christmas New Years Ain't New Years without the One You Love" (re-release)	—	—	—	—	—	—		—N/a
1980	"Girl, Don't Let It Get You Down"	55	3	—	—	—	—		The Year 2000
1980	"Once Is Not Enough"	—	44	—	—	—	—		The Year 2000
1982	"I Just Want to Satisfy"	101	15	—	—	—	—		My Favorite Person
1982	"My Favorite Person"	—	—	—	—	—	—		My Favorite Person
1982	"Your Body's Here with Me (But Your Mind's on the Other Side of Town)"	—	13	—	—	—	—		My Favorite Person
1983	"I Can't Stand the Pain"	—	35	—	—	—	—		When Will I See You Again
1983	"Put Our Heads Together"	—	35	11	—	—	45		When Will I See You Again
1984	"Extraordinary Girl"	—	26	—	—	—	87		Love and More
1984	"Let Me Show You (How Much I Really Love You)"	—	75	—	—	—	—		Love and More
1985	"Just Another Lonely Night"	—	18	—	—	—	—		Love Fever
1985	"What a Woman"	—	38	—	—	—	—		Love Fever
1987	"Don't Take Your Love Away"	—	60	—	—	—	—		Let Me Touch You
1987	"Lovin' You"	—	1	—	—	—	87		Let Me Touch You
1987	"Let Me Touch You"	—	5	—	—	—	—		Let Me Touch You
"—" denotes a recording that did not chart or was not released in that territory.

=== The later years ===
List of singles released from 1989 to 2018
Year	Single	Peak chart positions		Album
Year	Single	US	US R&B	Album
1989	"Have You Had Your Love Today"	—	1	Serious
1989	"Out of My Mind"	—	11	Serious
1989	"Serious Hold on Me"	—	9	Serious
1990	"Friend of a Friend"	—	55	Serious
1991	"Don't Let Me Down"	—	2	Emotionally Yours
1991	"Emotionally Yours"	—	5	Emotionally Yours
1991	"Keep on Lovin' Me"	—	4	Emotionally Yours
1993	"Somebody Else Will"	104	27	Heartbreaker
1993	"Heartbreaker"	—	66	Heartbreaker
1996	"Stairway to Heaven" (with Pure Soul)	79	18	Pure Soul
1997	"What's Stopping You"	73	21	Love You to Tears
1997	"Baby You Know"	76	34	Love You to Tears
1997	"Pay the Bills"	—	—	Love You to Tears
2001	"Let's Ride"	—	63	For the Love...
2004	"Make Up"	—	74	Imagination
2005	"Imagination"	—	25	Imagination
2018	"Above the Law"	—	—	The Last Word
"—" denotes a recording that did not chart or was not released in that territory.
