= List of songs written by Kenny Gamble and Leon Huff =

This is a list of songs written by Kenny Gamble and Leon Huff, either together as a songwriting partnership, with other writers, or individually.

== Notable songs written by Kenny Gamble and Leon Huff ==
Year	Song	Original artist	^{U.S. Pop}	^{U.S. R&B}	^{UK Singles Chart}	Other charting versions, and notes
1966	"Devil with an Angel's Smile"	The Intruders	-	29	-	
1966	"(We'll Be) United"	The Intruders	78	14	-	1967: The Music Makers, #78 pop, #48 R&B; 1968: Peaches & Herb, #46 pop, #11 R&B
1966	"I Struck It Rich"	Len Barry	98	-	-	
1967	"Expressway to Your Heart"	The Soul Survivors	4	3	-	1975: Margo Thunder, #25 R&B
1967	"Baby, I'm Lonely"	The Intruders	70	28	-	
1967	"A Love That's Real"	The Intruders	82	35	-	
1967	"Together"	The Intruders	-	-	-	1980: Tierra, #18 pop, #9 R&B
1967	"Explosion in Your Soul"	The Soul Survivors	33	45	-	
1967	"Lost"	Jerry Butler	62	15	-	Written by Gamble, Huff, and Jerry Butler
1968	"(You) Got What I Need"	Freddie Scott	-	27	-	
1968	"Cowboys to Girls"	The Intruders	6	1	-	1980: Philly Cream, #72 R&B
1968	"Love in Them There Hills"	The Vibrations	93	48	-	
1968	"Never Give You Up"	Jerry Butler	20	4	-	Written by Gamble, Huff, and Jerry Butler
1968	"(Love Is Like a) Baseball Game"	The Intruders	26	4	-	
1968	"I Can't Stop Dancing"	Archie Bell and the Drells	9	5	-	
1968	"Hey, Western Union Man"	Jerry Butler	16	1	-	Written by Gamble, Huff, and Jerry Butler
1968	"Do the Choo Choo"	Archie Bell and the Drells	44	17	-	
1968	"Slow Drag"	The Intruders	54	12	-	
1968	"(There's Gonna Be a) Showdown"	Archie Bell and the Drells	21	6	-	1973: Archie Bell and the Drells, #36 UK (reissue)
1969	"Branded Bad"	The O'Jays	-	41	-	
1969	"Give Her A Transplant"	The Intruders	-	23	-	Written by Gamble, Huff and Micki Farrow
1969	"Only the Strong Survive"	Jerry Butler	4	1	-	Written by Gamble, Huff and Jerry Butler; 1977: Billy Paul, #68 R&B, #33 UK
1969	"Me Tarzan, You Jane"	The Intruders	-	41	-	
1969	"Moody Woman"	Jerry Butler	24	3	-	Written by Gamble, Huff and Jerry Butler
1969	"Old Love"	The Intruders	-	35	-	
1969	"One Night Affair"	The O'Jays	68	15	-	1972: Jerry Butler, #52 pop, #6 R&B; 1979: Samona Cooke, #91 R&B
1969	"My Balloon's Going Up"	Archie Bell and the Drells	87	36	-	
1969	"Gotta Find) A Brand New Lover"	The Sweet Inspirations	-	25	-	
1969	"It's Been a Long Time"	Betty Everett	96	17	-	Written by Gamble, Huff and Jerry Butler
1969	"A World Without Music"	Archie Bell and the Drells	90	46	-	
1970	"Here I Go Again"	Archie Bell and the Drells	-	-	-	1972: Archie Bell and the Drells, #11 UK (reissue)
1970	"Silly, Silly Fool"	Dusty Springfield	76	-	-	
1970	"I Could Write a Book"	Jerry Butler	46	15	-	Written by Gamble, Huff and Jerry Butler
1970	"Tender (Was the Love We Knew)"	The Intruders	-	25	-	
1970	"Deeper (In Love with You)"	The O'Jays	64	21	-	
1970	"Check Yourself"	The Italian Asphalt & Pavement Company	97	-	-	
1970	"Looky Looky (Look at Me Girl)"	The O'Jays	98	17	-	
1970	"Engine Number 9"	Wilson Pickett	14	3	-	
1970	"This Is My Love Song"	The Intruders	85	22	-	
1971	"Determination"	The Ebonys	-	46	-	
1971	"Now I'm a Woman"	Nancy Wilson	93	41	-	
1971	"I'm Girl Scoutin'"	The Intruders	88	16	-	
1971	"You're the Reason Why"	The Ebonys	51	10	-	
1971	"Pray For Me"	The Intruders	-	25	-	
1971	"I'll Do Anything (He Wants Me To)"	Doris Troy	-	-	52	Written by Gamble, Huff and Doris Payne; 1978: Tony Blackburn (this version was re-released on the Northern soul scene in 1978 under the pseudonym 'Lenny Gamble')
1971	"I Bet He Don't Love You (Like I Love You)"	The Intruders	92	20	-	
1971	"Drowning in the Sea of Love"	Joe Simon	11	3	-	
1972	"(Win, Place or Show) She's a Winner "	The Intruders	-	12	-	1974: The Intruders, #14 UK (reissue)
1972	"Pool of Bad Luck"	Joe Simon	42	13	-	
1972	"I Miss You"	Harold Melvin & the Blue Notes	58	7	-	1974: The Dells, #60 pop, #8 R&B
1972	"Power of Love"	Joe Simon	11	1	-	1974: Martha Reeves, #76 pop, #27 R&B
1972	"If You Don't Know Me by Now"	Harold Melvin & the Blue Notes	3	1	9	1975: Lyn Collins, #82 R&B; 1982: Jean Carn, #49 R&B; 1986: Patti LaBelle, #79 R&B; 1989: Simply Red, #1 pop, #38 R&B, #2 UK
1972	"Me and Mrs. Jones"	Billy Paul	1	1	12	Written by Gamble, Huff, and Cary Gilbert; 1975: The Dramatics, #47 pop, #4 R&B; 1992: Freddie Jackson, #32 R&B, #32 UK
1972	"992 Arguments"	The O'Jays	57	13	-	
1973	"Dirty Ol' Man"	The Three Degrees	-	58	-	
1973	"Slow Motion"	Johnny Williams	42	13	-	
1973	"Love Train"	The O'Jays	1	1	9	1974: Bunny Sigler, #28 R&B
1973	"Yesterday I Had the Blues"	Harold Melvin & the Blue Notes	63	12	-	
1973	"Am I Black Enough For You"	Billy Paul	79	29	-	
1973	"Time to Get Down"	The O'Jays	33	2	53	
1973	"Now That We Found Love"	The O'Jays	-	-	-	1978: Third World, #47 pop, #9 R&B, #10 UK; 1985: Third World, #22 UK (reissue); 1991: Heavy D & the Boyz, #11 pop, #5 R&B, #2 UK
1973	"I'll Always Love My Mama"	The Intruders	36	6	32	Written by Gamble, Huff, Gene McFadden and John Whitehead
1973	"The Love I Lost"	Harold Melvin & the Blue Notes	7	1	21	1993: Sybil, #90 pop, #3 UK
1973	"I Wanna Know Your Name"	The Intruders	60	9	-	1986: The Force M.D.'s, #21 R&B
1973	"Put Your Hands Together"	The O'Jays	10	2	54	
1974	"A Nice Girl Like You"	The Intruders	-	21	-	
1974	"Be Truthful to Me"	Billy Paul	-	37	-	Written by Gamble, Huff, Gene McFadden and John Whitehead
1974	"I'm Weak for You "	Harold Melvin & the Blue Notes	-	87	-	Written by Gamble, Huff, and Cary Gilbert
1974	"Thanks for Saving My Life"	Billy Paul	37	9	-	
1974	"TSOP (The Sound of Philadelphia)"	M.F.S.B. feat. the Three Degrees	1	1	22	
1974	"For the Love of Money"	The O'Jays	9	3	53	Written by Gamble, Huff, and Anthony Jackson; 1989: BulletBoys, #78 pop 1992: Marky Mark & the Funky Bunch, "I Need Money", #61 pop 1992: Neneh Cherry, "Money Love", #23 UK; 1998: Charli Baltimore, "Money", #70 pop, #59 R&B, #12 UK
1974	"Satisfaction Guaranteed (Or Take Your Love Back)"	Harold Melvin & the Blue Notes	58	6	32	
1974	"Year of Decision"	The Three Degrees	-	74	13	
1974	"Love Is the Message"	M.F.S.B. feat. the Three Degrees	85	42	-	
1974	"When Will I See You Again"	The Three Degrees	2	4	1	1989: Brother Beyond, #43 UK; 1994: Sheila Ferguson, #60 UK
1974	"Get Your Love Back"	The Three Degrees	-	-	34	
1975	"Survival"	The O'Jays	-	10	-	
1975	"Take Good Care of Yourself"	The Three Degrees	-	64	9	
1975	"Give the People What They Want"	The O'Jays	45	1	-	
1975	"Sexy"	M.F.S.B.	42	2	37	
1975	"Hope That We Can Be Together Soon"	Sharon Paige and Harold Melvin & the Blue Notes	42	1	-	
1975	"Long Lost Lover"	The Three Degrees	-	-	40	
1975	"I Love Music"	The O'Jays	5	1	13	1993: Rozalla, #76 pop, #18 UK
1975	"The Zip"	M.F.S.B.	91	72	-	
1975	"Don't Leave Me This Way"	Harold Melvin & the Blue Notes	-	-	-	Written by Gamble, Huff, and Cary Gilbert; 1976: Thelma Houston, #1 pop, #1 R&B, #13 UK; 1977: Harold Melvin & the Blue Notes, #5 UK; 1986: The Communards, #40 pop, #1 UK; 1995: Thelma Houston, #35 UK (reissue)
1976	"Livin' for the Weekend"	The O'Jays	20	1	-	Written by Gamble, Huff, and Cary Gilbert
1976	"Stairway to Heaven"	The O'Jays	-	-	-	1996: Pure Soul feat. the O'Jays, #79 pop, #18 R&B
1976	"Let's Make a Baby"	Billy Paul	83	18	30	
1976	"Family Reunion"	The O'Jays	-	45	-	
1976	"You'll Never Find Another Love Like Mine"	Lou Rawls	2	1	10	1976: Stanley Turrentine, #68 R&B
1976	"Message in Our Music"	The O'Jays	49	1	51	
1976	"Groovy People"	Lou Rawls	64	19	-	
1976	"Enjoy Yourself"	The Jacksons	6	2	42	
1976	"When Love Is New"	Arthur Prysock	64	10	-	
1977	"I Trust You"	Billy Paul	-	79	-	
1977	"I Wantcha Baby"	Arthur Prysock	-	43	-	
1977	"This Song Will Last Forever"	Lou Rawls	-	74	-	Written by Gamble, Huff, and Cary Gilbert
1977	"Work On Me"	The O'Jays	-	7	-	
1977	"Darlin' Darlin' Baby (Sweet, Tender, Love)"	The O'Jays	72	1	24	
1977	"Free Love"	Jean Carn	-	23	-	
1977	"Show You the Way to Go"	The Jacksons	28	6	1	1992: Dannii Minogue, #30 UK
1977	"I Don't Love You Anymore"	Teddy Pendergrass	41	5	-	
1977	"After You Love Me, Why Do You Leave Me"	Harold Melvin & the Blue Notes feat. Sharon Paige	-	15	-	
1977	"See You When I Get There"	Lou Rawls	66	8	-	
1977	"Dreamer"	The Jacksons	-	-	22	
1977	"Let's Clean Up the Ghetto"	Philadelphia International All Stars	91	4	34	Written by Gamble, Huff, and Cary Gilbert
1977	"Goin' Places"	The Jacksons	52	8	26	
1978	"Use Ta Be My Girl"	The O'Jays	4	1	12	1978: M.F.S.B., #94 R&B
1978	"Find Me a Girl"	The Jacksons	-	38	-	
1978	"One Life to Live"	Lou Rawls	-	32	-	
1978	"Close the Door"	Teddy Pendergrass	25	1	-	
1978	"There Will Be Love"	Lou Rawls	-	76	-	
1978	"Don't Let It Go to Your Head"	Jean Carn	-	54	-	1983: Fat Larry's Band, #93 UK; 1992: The Brand New Heavies, #24 UK
1978	"(I'm Just Thinking About) Cooling Out"	Jerry Butler	-	14	-	Written by Gamble, Huff, and Jerry Butler
1978	"Only You"	Teddy Pendergrass	-	22	41	1997: Funk Essentials, #79 UK
1979	"Nothing Says I Love You Like I Love You"	Jerry Butler	-	86	-	Written by Gamble, Huff, and Jerry Butler
1979	"Come Go With Me"	Teddy Pendergrass	-	14	-	1993: Christopher Williams, #74 R&B
1979	"You Gonna Make Me Love Somebody Else"	The Jones Girls	38	5	-	
1979	"Let Me Be Good to You"	Lou Rawls	-	11	-	
1979	"Turn Off the Lights"	Teddy Pendergrass	48	2	-	
1979	"Sing a Happy Song"	The O'Jays	102	7	39	
1979	"Forever Mine"	The O'Jays	28	4	-	
1980	"Dance Turned into a Romance"	The Jones Girls	-	22	-	
1980	"I Just Love the Man"	The Jones Girls	-	9	-	
1980	"I Should Be Your Lover"	Harold Melvin & the Blue Notes	-	25	-	Written by Gamble, Huff, and Harold Melvin
1980	"I Wanna Know Your Name"	Frank Hooker & Positive People	-	40	-	
1980	"I'm At Your Mercy"	The Jones Girls	-	77	-	
1980	"It's You I Love"	Teddy Pendergrass	-	44	-	
1980	"Shout and Scream"	Teddy Pendergrass	-	21	-	
1980	"Sit Down and Talk to Me"	Lou Rawls	-	26	-	
1980	"You're My Sweetness"	Billy Paul	-	69	-	
1980	"The Best Love I Ever Had"	Jerry Butler	-	49	-	
1980	"You're My Blessing"	Lou Rawls	77	-	-	
1980	"Girl, Don't Let It Get You Down"	The O'Jays	55	3	-	
1981	"(I Found) That Man of Mine"	The Jones Girls	-	20	-	
1981	"I Can't Live without Your Love"	Teddy Pendergrass	-	10	-	
1982	"This Gift of Life"	Teddy Pendergrass	-	31	-	
1982	"You're My Latest, My Greatest Inspiration"	Teddy Pendergrass	43	4	-	
1983	"I Can't Stand the Pain"	The O'Jays	-	35	-	
1987	"I Wish You Belonged to Me"	Lou Rawls	-	28	-	
1987	"Lovin' You"	The O'Jays	-	1	-	
1993	"You're the Love of My Life"	Sybil	-	37	-	Written by Gamble, Huff, Glenn Toby and Sybil
1997	"I'm Not a Player"	Big Punisher	57	19	-	

== Notable songs written by Kenny Gamble solo or with other writers ==
Year	Song	Original artist	^{U.S. Pop}	^{U.S. R&B}	^{UK Singles Chart}	Other charting versions, and notes
1963	"Everybody Monkey"	Freddy Cannon	52	-	-	Written by Gamble and Jerry Ross
1963	"Watch Your Step"	Brooks O'Dell	58	16	-	Written by Gamble, Luther Dixon and Thom Bell
1964	"Who Do You Love"	The Sapphires	25	9	-	Written by Gamble and Jerry Ross
1964	"The Boy with the Beatle Hair"	The Swans	85	-	-	Written by Gamble, Jerry Ross, Billy Jackson and Joe Renzetti
1964	"The 81"	Candy and the Kisses	51	19	-	Written by Gamble and Jerry Ross
1965	"Finders, Keepers, Losers, Weepers"	Nella Dodds	96	-	-	Written by Gamble
1965	"Chains of Love"	The Drifters	90	-	-	Written by Gamble and James Bishop
1965	"I Really Love You"	Dee Dee Sharp	78	37	-	Written by Gamble and James Bishop; 1969: The Ambassadors, #43 R&B
1966	"I'm Gonna Make You Love Me"	Dee Dee Warwick	88	13	-	Written by Gamble and Jerry Ross; 1968: Madeline Bell, #26 pop, #32 R&B; 1968: Diana Ross & the Supremes and the Temptations, #2 pop, #2 R&B, #3 UK
1966	"Love Me"	Bobby Hebb	84	-	-	Written by Gamble and Jerry Ross
1968	"Let's Make a Promise"	Peaches & Herb	75	34	-	Written by Gamble, Thom Bell and Mikki Farrow
1968	"Are You Happy"	Jerry Butler	39	9	-	Written by Gamble, Theresa Bell and Jerry Butler
1969	"I Love My Baby"	Archie Bell and the Drells	94	40	-	Written by Gamble and Thom Bell
1969	"Girl You're Too Young"	Archie Bell and the Drells	59	13	-	Written by Gamble, Thom Bell and Archie Bell
1969	"What's the Use of Breaking Up"	Jerry Butler	20	4	-	Written by Gamble, Thom Bell, and Jerry Butler
1969	"A Brand New Me"	Jerry Butler	-	-	-	Written by Gamble, Thom Bell, and Jerry Butler; 1969: Dusty Springfield, #24 pop
1969	"Don't Let Love Hang You Up"	Jerry Butler	44	12	-	Written by Gamble, Thom Bell, and Jerry Butler
1973	"Break Up to Make Up"	The Stylistics	5	5	34	Written by Gamble, Thom Bell, and Linda Creed; 1991: Cynthia, #70 pop 1994: Will Downing, #66 R&B
1982	"I Just Want to Satisfy"	The O'Jays	-	15	-	Written by Gamble, Cecil Womack and Linda Womack
1983	"Put Our Heads Together"	The O'Jays	-	35	45	Written by Gamble and Keni Burke
1984	"I Want My Baby Back"	Teddy Pendergrass	-	61	-	Written by Gamble and Cecil Womack
1984	"Love, Need and Want You"	Patti LaBelle	-	10	-	Written by Gamble and Bunny Sigler
1984	"If Only You Knew"	Patti LaBelle	46	1	-	Written by Gamble, Cynthia Biggs and Dexter Wansel; 1995: Phil Perry, #43 R&B
1986	"Last Night I Needed Somebody"	Shirley Jones	-	36	-	Written by Gamble, Cynthia Biggs and Dexter Wansel
1987	"Living All Alone"	Phyllis Hyman	-	12	-	Written by Gamble, Cynthia Biggs and Dexter Wansel
1987	"She Knew About Me"	Shirley Jones	-	80	-	Written by Gamble, Reggie Griffin and Shirley Jones
1991	"Living In Confusion"	Phyllis Hyman	-	9	-	Written by Gamble, Terry Burrus and Phyllis Hyman
1996	"I'm Truly Yours"	Phyllis Hyman	-	94	-	Written by Gamble and James Sigler
1998	"Funny How Love Goes"	Phyllis Hyman	-	75	-	Written by Gamble and Walter Sigler

== Notable songs written by Leon Huff solo or with other writers ==
Year	Song	Original artist	^{U.S. Pop}	^{U.S. R&B}	^{UK Singles Chart}	Other charting versions, and notes
1964	"Mixed-Up, Shook-Up Girl"	Patty & the Emblems	37	13	-	Written by Huff and Ralston McGriff
1966	"It's That Time of the Year"	Len Barry	91	-	-	Written by Huff, John Madara and David White
1966	"Hey You Little Boo-Ga-Loo"	Chubby Checker	76	-	-	Written by Huff, John Madara, David White, and Len Barry
1968	"At the Top of the Stairs"	The Formations	83	-	28	Written by Huff and Jerry Akins
1972	"Back Stabbers"	The O'Jays	3	1	14	Written by Huff, Gene McFadden and John Whitehead
1973	"It's Forever"	The Ebonys	68	14	-	Written by Huff
1975	"Do It Any Way You Wanna"	People's Choice	11	1	36	Written by Huff
1976	"Nursery Rhymes"	People's Choice	93	22	-	Written by Huff and Cary Gilbert
1976	"Here We Go Again"	People's Choice	-	52	-	Written by Huff
1976	"Movin' in All Directions"	People's Choice	-	52	-	Written by Huff, Darnell Jordan and Donald Ford
1976	"My Music"	Bunny Sigler	-	98	-	Written by Huff, Bunny Sigler, John Whitehead, Gene McFadden and Victor Carstarphen
1976	"Let's Groove"	Archie Bell and the Drells	-	7	-	Written by Huff, John Whitehead, Gene McFadden and Victor Carstarphen
1977	"Cold Blooded & Down-Right-Funky"	People's Choice	-	83	-	Written by Huff and Frankie Brunson
1977	"If You Gonna Do It (Put Your Mind to It)"	People's Choice	-	76	-	Written by Huff
1978	"Jam, Jam, Jam (All Night Long)"	People's Choice	-	-	40	Written by Huff and Frankie Brunson
1979	"I Wanna Do the Do"	Bobby Rush	-	75	-	Written by Huff and Bobby Rush
1980	"Tight Money"	Leon Huff	-	68	-	Written by Huff
1981	"I Ain't Jivin', I'm Jammin'"	Leon Huff	-	57	-	Written by Huff
1986	"Don't Let Love Get You Down'"	Archie Bell and the Drells	-	-	49	Written by Huff, John Whitehead, Gene McFadden and Victor Carstarphen
