= The Very Best of the O'Jays =

Compilation album by The O'Jays
- Released: April 20, 1998
- Genre: Soul, pop
- Length: 77:55
- Label: Sony Music Entertainment, Epic, Philadelphia International Records
- Producer: The O-Jays

The Very Best of the O'Jays is a compilation album featuring all their greatest hits. It is part of Sony's Playlist album series, which covers 1972 through to 1978, when the O'Jays (and Gamble & Huff) were at the peak of the Charts. Every song on the album has placed somewhere within the Top 20 of the R&B chart, and many of them went to the top of the chart including "Back Stabbers," "Love Train," "For the Love of Money," and "Use ta Be My Girl,"

== Track listing ==
All tracks are written by The O'Jays.

No.	Title	Length
1.	"Back Stabbers"	3:03
2.	"Love Train"	2:58
3.	"I Love Music"	3:34
4.	"Darlin' Darlin' Baby (Sweet, Tender, Love)"	3:04
5.	"Use Ta Be My Girl"	3:20
6.	"Brandy (I Really Miss You)"	3:33
7.	"Now That We Found Love"	3:09
8.	"Put Our Heads Together"	3:36
9.	"Message in Our Music"	3:23
10.	"Sing a Happy Song"	3:36
11.	"Extraordinary Girl"	5:16
12.	"Give The People What They Want"	4:12
13.	"For the Love of Money"	3:48
14.	"992 Arguments"	2:22
15.	"Time To Get Down"	2:52
16.	"Livin' for the Weekend"	2:53
17.	"Looky Looky (Look At Me Girl)"	2:44
18.	"One Night Affair"	2:18
19.	"Deeper (In Love With You)"	2:38
20.	"Don't Call Me Brother"	8:54
21.	"Love Train (Extended Version)"	6:15
Total length:		77:55

1998 re-issue • Jaimi Vozzi – digital remaster • Joe Mac– premastering • Frank Tozour – sony editing
