= Survival (The O'Jays album) =

Studio album by The O'Jays
- Released: April 1975
- Recorded: 1974
- Studio: Sigma Sound, Philadelphia, Pennsylvania
- Genre: Philadelphia soul, R&B, funk
- Length: 32:52
- Label: Philadelphia International Records
- Producer: Kenny Gamble, Leon Huff

The O'Jays chronology
Ship Ahoy (1973)	Survival (1975)	Family Reunion (1975)

Singles from Survival
- 1. "Give the People What They Want" Released: April 1975; 2. "Let Me Make Love to You" Released: August 1975

Professional ratings
Review scores
Source	Rating
AllMusic	4/5 stars
Christgau's Record Guide	C+

Survival is the eighth album by American R&B group The O'Jays, released in April 1975 via Philadelphia International Records label.

== Reception ==
Recorded at Sigma Sound Studios in Philadelphia, and produced by Kenny Gamble and Leon Huff, Survival includes the R&B chart-topping single "Give the People What They Want" and "Let Me Make Love to You", which reached #10 on the same chart. Survival matched exactly the chart performance of its predecessor Ship Ahoy, topping the R&B chart and peaking at #11 on the pop chart.

According to AllMusic's Ron Wynn, Survival "followed the spectacular Back Stabbers and Ship Ahoy" as a "good, but not on the same level" album featuring "many strong ballads and good message tracks". Wynn adds that, "while it may not have been as epic in its performances and compositions, it was certainly the other albums' equal in sales strength." The Village Voice critic Robert Christgau wrote more harshly of the LP: "Except for the astonishing 'Rich Get Richer,' based on a text by Ferdinand Lundberg, this is the drabbest studio album this group has made since joining Gamble-Huff. Unfortunately, 'Rich Get Richer' is not the single." The jazz writer Rob Backus cites the song as a politically charged work in progressive soul.

== Track listing ==
All tracks are written by Gamble and Huff, except where noted

Side one
No.	Title	Writer(s)	Length
1.	"Give the People What They Want"		4:14
2.	"Let Me Make Love to You"	Bunny Sigler, Allan Felder	4:21
3.	"Survival"		3:44
4.	"Where Did We Go Wrong"		3:40

Side two
No.	Title	Writer(s)	Length
5.	"Rich Get Richer"		4:24
6.	"How Time Flies"		5:15
7.	"What Am I Waiting For"	Bunny Sigler, Ron Tyson	3:56
8.	"Never Break Us Up"	Leon Huff	3:18

== Charts ==
Album

Chart (1975)	Peak position
Australia (Kent Music Report)	91
Billboard Pop Albums	11
Billboard Top Soul Albums	1

Singles

Year	Single	Chart positions	
Year	Single	U.S. Billboard Hot 100	US R&B
1975	"Give the People What They Want"	45	1
1975	"Let Me Make Love to You" (A-side)	75	10
1975	"Survival" (B-side)	—	10

== See also ==
- List of number-one R&B albums of 1975 (U.S.)
