= Family Reunion (album) =

Studio album by The O'Jays
- Released: November 25, 1975
- Recorded: 1975
- Studios: Sigma Sound, Philadelphia, Pennsylvania
- Genres: Philadelphia soul, R&B, disco
- Length: 44:06
- Label: Philadelphia International Records
- Producer: Kenny Gamble, Leon Huff

The O'Jays chronology
Survival (1975)	Family Reunion (1975)	Message in the Music (1976)

Family Reunion is the ninth studio album by American R&B group The O'Jays, released on November 25, 1975, by Philadelphia International Records.

== Reception ==
Professional ratings
Review scores
Source	Rating
AllMusic	3.5/5 stars
Christgau's Record Guide	C

The album was released in late 1975 on the Philadelphia International Records label. Recorded at Sigma Sound Studios in Philadelphia, and produced by Kenny Gamble and Leon Huff, Family Reunion includes the enduring classic "I Love Music" and "Livin' for the Weekend", both of which topped the R&B singles chart, and placed at #5 and #20 respectively on the pop chart. The ballad "Stairway to Heaven", originally issued as the B-side to "Livin' for the Weekend" and unrelated to the Led Zeppelin song of the same name, has also gone on to become a staple of quiet storm radio programming. While the title track did not chart, it still garnered airplay, as the lyrics (as well as the album artwork) focused on the importance of the family structure especially at gatherings.

Family Reunion became the group's third consecutive R&B chart-topping album, and its #7 peak on the pop chart was their highest placing on this chart at the time (1978's So Full of Love would peak one place higher). Family Reunion was awarded a Platinum Album for RIAA Certification of over one million copies sold.

== Track listing ==
All tracks are written by Gamble and Huff, except where noted

Side one
No.	Title	Writer(s)	Length
1.	"Unity"		4:59
2.	"Family Reunion"		6:55
3.	"You and Me"	Bunny Sigler, Louise Bishop	5:59
4.	"She's Only a Woman"	John Whitehead, Gene McFadden, Victor Carstarphen	5:44

Side two
No.	Title	Writer(s)	Length
5.	"Livin' for the Weekend"	Gamble, Huff, Cary Gilbert	6:29
6.	"Stairway to Heaven"		6:15
7.	"I Love Music"		6:51

== Charts ==
Album

Chart (1976)	Peak position
Billboard Pop Albums	7
Billboard Top Soul Albums	1 (1975)

Singles

Year	Single	Chart positions		
Year	Single	U.S. Billboard Hot 100	US R&B	U.S. Disco Singles
1975	"I Love Music (Part 1)"	5	1	1
1975	"Livin' for the Weekend"	20	1	—

== See also ==
- List of number-one R&B albums of 1975 (U.S.)
