= Lovin' You (The O'Jays song) =

- Label of 7-inch 45 rpm single

Single by The O'Jays

from the album Let Me Touch You
- B-side: "Don't Let The Dream Get Away"
- Released: 1987
- Genre: Soul
- Length: 4:05
- Label: Philadelphia International
- Songwriter: Gamble and Huff
- Producer: Gamble and Huff

The O'Jays singles chronology
"Use ta Be My Girl" (1978)	"Lovin' You" (1987)	"Have You Had Your Love Today" (1989)

"Lovin' You" is a 1987 single by the O'Jays from their album, Let Me Touch You, and written by songwriting duo Kenny Gamble and Leon Huff. The single, which topped the Billboard R&B chart for one week, was the O'Jays first number one on that chart since "Use Ta Be My Girl" in 1978. The song is the final O'Jays number one to be written and produced by Gamble and Huff.

== Charts ==
=== Weekly charts ===
Chart (1987)	Peak position
US Hot R&B/Hip-Hop Songs (Billboard)	1

=== Year-end charts ===
Chart (1987)	Position
US Hot R&B/Hip-Hop Songs (Billboard)	44
