= Sit Down and Talk to Me =

Studio album by Lou Rawls
- Released: January 1980
- Recorded: June–October 1979
- Studios: Sigma Sound, Philadelphia, Pennsylvania; Sound Labs, Los Angeles, California
- Genres: Philadelphia soul, jazz
- Length: 37:22
- Label: Philadelphia International
- Producers: Kenny Gamble, Leon Huff, Dexter Wansel, Thom Bell, Gene McFadden, John Whitehead, Bunny Sigler

Lou Rawls chronology
Let Me Be Good to You (1979)	Sit Down and Talk to Me (1980)	Shades of Blue (1981)

Professional ratings
Review scores
Source	Rating
AllMusic	3/5 stars

Sit Down and Talk to Me is a 1980 album by American R&B singer Lou Rawls, released on the Philadelphia International Records label. All of PIR's major production names contributed to the album, resulting in a diverse set of tracks from dance to urban blues. Although Sit Down and Talk to Me did not produce any major hit singles, its commercial performance was adequate, peaking at #19 R&B and #81 pop.

== Track listing ==
1. "One Day Soon You'll Need Me" (Gene McFadden, John Whitehead, Jerry Cohen) – 4:38
2. "Heartache (Just When You Think You're Loved)" (Thom Bell, LeRoy Bell, Anthony Bell) – 4:43
3. "Ain't That Loving You (for More Reasons than One)" (Homer Banks, Allen Jones) – 4:39
4. "When You Get Home" (Bunny Sigler, Ron Tyson) – 4:51
5. "Sit Down and Talk to Me" (Gamble, Huff) – 4:53
6. "You're My Blessing" (Gamble, Huff) – 4:22
7. "Old Times" (Dexter Wansel, Cynthia Biggs) – 4:26
8. "You Are" (Thom Bell, LeRoy Bell, Casey James, Jack Robinson) – 4:50

== Singles ==
- "Ain't That Loving You (For More Reasons Than One)" (US R&B #57)
- "Sit Down and Talk to Me" (US R&B #26)
- "You're My Blessing" (US Pop #77)

== Personnel ==
- Lou Rawls - vocals
