= Back Stabbers (album) =

Studio album by the O'Jays
- Released: August 1, 1972
- Recorded: 1972
- Studios: Sigma Sound, Philadelphia, Pennsylvania
- Genres: Soul; funk; Philadelphia soul
- Length: 39:54
- Labels: Philadelphia International; Epic
- Producers: Gamble & Huff; Bunny Sigler

The O'Jays chronology
Super Bad (1971)	Back Stabbers (1972)	Ship Ahoy (1973)

Singles from Back Stabbers
- 1. "Back Stabbers" Released: May 31, 1972; 2. "992 Arguments" Released: October 17, 1972; 3. "Love Train" Released: December 20, 1972; 4. "Time to Get Down" Released: April 19, 1973

Back Stabbers is the sixth studio album by Philadelphia soul group the O'Jays, released in August 1972 by Philadelphia International Records. The recording sessions for the album took place at Sigma Sound Studios in Philadelphia in 1972.

== Reception ==
Professional ratings
Review scores
Source	Rating
AllMusic	5/5 stars
Christgau's Record Guide	B+
The Daily Vault	A
The Encyclopedia of Popular Music	4/5 stars
Melody Maker	favorable
MusicHound R&B	5/5 stars
Pitchfork	9.2/10
Rolling Stone 1972	favorable
Rolling Stone 2004	4.5/5 stars
Yahoo! Music	favorable

Back Stabbers was a breakthrough album for the group, reaching the top 10 of the Billboard Pop Albums chart and selling over 500,000 copies within a year of release. It also featured two of their most successful singles, "Back Stabbers" and "Love Train", which hit No. 1 on the Billboard Pop Singles chart. On September 1, 1972, the title track was certified as a gold single by the Recording Industry Association of America.

The following year, on May 8, Back Stabbers was also certified Gold by the RIAA. It has gained the reputation as a landmark album of early 1970s soul and has been cited by critics as "the pinnacle of Philly soul." In 2012, the album was ranked No. 318 on Rolling Stone's list of the 500 greatest albums of all time.

It was voted No. 754 in the third edition of Colin Larkin's All Time Top 1000 Albums (2000).

== Usage ==
The song "Back Stabbers" was featured on the Looking for Mr. Goodbar soundtrack.

"Back Stabbers" was featured on the Carlito's Way soundtrack, which was found and collected as evidence from O. J. Simpson's white Ford Bronco.

"Back Stabbers" was featured on the Dragged Across Concrete soundtrack.

"Who Am I?" is sampled on the Atmosphere track "Little Man", from the album You Can't Imagine How Much Fun We're Having.

== Track listing ==
Side one
No.	Title	Writer(s)	Length
1.	"When the World's at Peace"	Kenneth Gamble, Bunny Sigler, Phil Hurtt	5:21
2.	"Back Stabbers"	Leon Huff, Gene McFadden, John Whitehead	3:07
3.	"Who Am I"	Sigler, Hurtt	5:14
4.	"(They Call Me) Mr. Lucky"	Gamble, Huff	3:20
5.	"Time to Get Down"	Gamble, Huff	2:53

Side two
No.	Title	Writer(s)	Length
1.	"992 Arguments"	Gamble, Huff	6:09
2.	"Listen to the Clock on the Wall"	Gamble, Huff, Whitehead, McFadden	3:48
3.	"Shiftless, Shady, Jealous Kind of People"	Gamble, Huff, Whitehead, McFadden	3:36
4.	"Sunshine"	Sigler, Hurtt	3:42
5.	"Love Train"	Gamble, Huff	2:59

2011 remastered reissue bonus tracks
No.	Title	Writer(s)	Length
11.	"992 Arguments" (single version)	Gamble, Huff, Whitehead, McFadden	2:22
12.	"Love Train" (Tom Moulton Mix)	Gamble, Huff	6:13

== Personnel ==
The O’Jays

- Eddie Levert
- Walter Williams
- William Powell

Musicians

- Dennis Harris – guitar
- Bobby Eli – guitar
- Roland Chambers – guitar
- Bunny Sigler – guitar, piano, producer
- Norman Harris – arranger, guitar
- Ronnie Baker – bass guitar
- Lenny Pakula – organ
- Leon Huff – producer, piano
- Earl Young – drums
- Don Renaldo – conductor, horns, strings
- Thom Bell – arranger, strings, producer
- Larry Washington – bongos, congas, percussion
- Vincent Montana Jr. – percussion, vibraphone

Production and design

- Kenneth Gamble – producer
- Tony Martell – executive producer
- Adam Block – director
- Joe Tarsia – engineer
- Leo Sacks – reissue producer
- Tony Sellari – art direction
- Bobby Martin – arranger
- Thom Bell – arranger

== Charts ==
=== Weekly charts ===
Title	Information
Back Stabbers	US Pop Albums (1972) No. 10; US Black Albums No. 3

=== Singles ===
Title	Information
"992 Arguments"	US Pop Singles (1972) No. 57; US Black Singles No. 13
"Back Stabbers"	US Pop Singles (1972) No. 3; US Black Singles No. 1
"Love Train"	US Pop Singles (1973) No. 1; US Black Singles No. 1
"Time to Get Down"	US Pop Singles (1973) No. 33; US Black Singles No. 2
