= Identify Yourself =

Studio album by the O'Jays
- Released: 1979
- Recorded: 1978–79
- Studios: Sigma Sound, Philadelphia, Pennsylvania
- Genres: Philadelphia soul, R&B
- Length: 40:15
- Label: Philadelphia International
- Producers: Kenny Gamble, Leon Huff, Eddie Levert, Walter Williams, Thom Bell

The O'Jays chronology
So Full of Love (1978)	Identify Yourself (1979)	The Year 2000 (1980)

Identify Yourself is the thirteenth album by American R&B group the O'Jays, released on the Philadelphia International Records label in 1979. It was recorded at Sigma Sound Studios in Philadelphia, with four tracks produced by Kenny Gamble and Leon Huff, three by group members Eddie Levert and Walter Williams and one by the esteemed Philadelphia producer and composer Thom Bell.

The album reached No. 3 on the US R&B albums chart and No. 16 on the pop albums chart, and was certified platinum for sales of over one million copies sold. Two singles from the album reached the top ten on the R&B singles chart in the United States: "Sing a Happy Song" (No. 7) and "Forever Mine" (No. 4); the latter peaking at No. 28 on the Billboard Hot 100, and the group's last single to reach the pop top 50.

== Critical reception ==
Professional ratings
Review scores
Source	Rating
AllMusic	2.5/5 stars
Smash Hits	6/10
The Virgin Encyclopedia of R&B and Soul	3/5 stars

The Bay State Banner wrote that Eddie Levert "transforms 'Forever Mine' into an awesome, engrossing and soulful summation of great love music, just as Smokey Robinson does on 'Cruising'."

== Track listing ==
All songs written by Kenneth Gamble and Leon Huff, except where noted.

Side one

1. "Sing a Happy Song" – 5:03
2. "Get On Out and Party" (Walter Williams, Terry Stubbs, Leroy Simmons, Mike Jackson) – 5:04
3. "Identify" – 4:56
4. "So Nice I Tried It Twice" (Williams, Jackson, Willie Ross) – 5:50

Side two

1. "Hurry Up and Come Back" (Eddie Levert, Jackson, Williams) – 5:09
2. "Forever Mine" – 6:10
3. "I Want You Here with Me" – 5:28
4. "One in a Million (Girl)" (Thom Bell, Joseph Ericksen) – 3:55

== Personnel ==
- Eddie Levert, Walter Williams, Sammy Strain – vocals
- Don Renaldo – horns, strings
- Roland Chambers, Dennis Harris, Anthony Bell, Bobby Eli – guitar
- Quinton Joseph, Leon "Ndugu" Chancler, Charles Collins – drums
- James Williams, Willie Ross, Bob Babbitt – bass guitar
- James Mtume, David Cruse – percussion
- Leon Huff, Mike Jackson, Thom Bell – keyboards
- Lenny Pakula, Dunn Pearson – organ
- Ed Shea – timpanies

== Charts ==
=== Weekly charts ===
Chart (1979)	Peak position
US Billboard 200	16
US Top R&B/Hip-Hop Albums (Billboard)	3

=== Year-end charts ===
Chart (1980)	Position
US Billboard 200	97
US Top R&B/Hip-Hop Albums (Billboard)	18

== Singles ==
- "Sing a Happy Song" (US R&B No. 7, UK No. 39)
- "I Want You Here with Me" (US R&B No. 49)
- "Forever Mine" (US R&B No. 4, US Pop No. 28)
- "Hurry Up and Come Back"
