= Travelin' at the Speed of Thought =

Studio album by The O'Jays
- Released: May 1977
- Recorded: 1976–77
- Studio: Sigma Sound, Philadelphia, Pennsylvania
- Genre: Philadelphia soul, R&B
- Length: 37:59
- Label: Philadelphia International Records
- Producer: Kenny Gamble, Leon Huff, Gene McFadden, John Whitehead, Victor Carstarphen, Dennis Williams

The O'Jays chronology
Message in the Music (1976)	Travelin' at the Speed of Thought (1977)	So Full of Love (1978)

Professional ratings
Review scores
Source	Rating
AllMusic	3/5 stars
The Encyclopedia of Popular Music	3/5 stars
The New Rolling Stone Record Guide	3/5 stars

Travelin' at the Speed of Thought is the eleventh album by the American R&B group the O'Jays, released in 1977 on Philadelphia International Records. Unusual for the time, there had been no advance single release from the album; the only single subsequently issued, "Work on Me", became a #7 R&B hit but failed to reach the pop listings, making this the first O'Jays PIR album without a top 100 pop single. Travelin' at the Speed of Thought peaked at #6 on the R&B chart and reached #27 on the pop chart. The album achieved a gold certification.

In 2004, Travelin' at the Speed of Thought was reissued by Demon Music in the UK in a double package with the O'Jays' previous album, Message in the Music.

== Production ==
The album was recorded at Sigma Sound Studios in Philadelphia, with six of the eight tracks written and produced by Kenny Gamble and Leon Huff. Travelin' at the Speed of Thought is the first O'Jays album to feature vocals from Sammy Strain, who in 1975 had been brought into the group as the replacement for the then-terminally ill William Powell. Powell's death from cancer in May 1977 coincided with the release of the album.

== Track listing ==
All songs written by Kenneth Gamble and Leon Huff, except where noted.

=== Side one ===
1. "Travelin' at the Speed of Thought" - 4:59
2. "We're All in This Thing Together" - 4:52
3. "So Glad I Got You, Girl" - 3:32
4. "Stand Up" - 4:46

=== Side two ===
1. "Those Lies (Done Caught Up with You This Time)" (John Whitehead, Gene McFadden, Victor Carstarphen) - 3:45
2. "Feelings" (Morris Albert) - 7:11
3. "Work on Me" - 4:26
4. "Let's Spend Some Time Together" - 4:33

== Personnel ==
- Eddie Levert, Walter Williams, Sammy Strain - vocals
- MFSB - horns, strings
- Roland Chambers, Dennis Harris, T.J. Tindall - guitar
- Charles Collins - drums
- Michael "Sugar Bear" Foreman - bass guitar
- Larry Washington - congas, bongos
- Dennis Williams - piano
- Carlton Kent - organ
