= Message in the Music =

1976 album by The O'Jays

Studio album by The O'Jays
- Released: 1976
- Recorded: 1975–76
- Studios: Sigma Sound, Philadelphia, Pennsylvania
- Genres: Philadelphia soul, R&B
- Length: 42:51
- Label: Philadelphia International Records
- Producers: Kenny Gamble, Leon Huff, Bunny Sigler, Gene McFadden, John Whitehead, Victor Carstarphen

The O'Jays chronology
Family Reunion (1975)	Message in the Music (1976)	Travelin' at the Speed of Thought (1977)

Singles from Message in the Music
- 1. "Message in Our Music" Released: September 1976; 2. "Darlin' Darlin' Baby (Sweet, Tender, Love)" Released: November 1976

Message in the Music is the tenth studio album by American R&B group the O'Jays, released in 1976 by Philadelphia International Records. This album peaked at No. 3 on the US Billboard Top Soul Albums chart and No. 20 on the US Billboard 200. Message in the Music has also been certified Gold in the US by the RIAA.

== Background ==
Recorded at the Sigma Sound Studios in Philadelphia, most of the album was composed and produced by Kenny Gamble and Leon Huff.

Message in the Music is the last O'Jays album to feature vocals from original group member William Powell, who would die prematurely from cancer, aged 35, in May 1977.

In 2004, Message in the Music was reissued by Demon Music in the UK in a double package with The O'Jays' 1977 album Travelin' at the Speed of Thought.

=== Singles ===
Message in the Music spawned two R&B chart-topping singles in "Message in Our Music" and "Darlin' Darlin' Baby (Sweet, Tender, Love)", with the latter also giving the group their fourth UK top 30 single.

== Critical reception ==
Professional ratings
Review scores
Source	Rating
AllMusic	3/5 stars
Christgau's Record Guide	B−
The New York Times	(favourable)

Andrew Hamilton of Allmusic proclaimed, "The O'Jays' vocals are stellar throughout this lively eight-song collection. Political and social lyrics weigh heavy but don't overburden this set...Another good slice of soul from the Canton, OH, natives."

== Track listing ==
All tracks are written by Gamble and Huff, except where noted

Side one
No.	Title	Length
1.	"Message in Our Music"	6:24
2.	"A Prayer"	6:30
3.	"Paradise"	5:02
4.	"Make a Joyful Noise"	4:02

Side two
No.	Title	Writer(s)	Length
5.	"Desire Me"		6:21
6.	"Darlin' Darlin' Baby (Sweet, Tender, Love)"		4:14
7.	"I Swear, I Love No One But You"	Bunny Sigler	5:13
8.	"Let Life Flow"	John Whitehead, Gene McFadden, Victor Carstarphen	4:37

== Charts ==
Album

Chart (1976)	Peak position
Billboard Pop Albums	20
Billboard Top Soul Albums	3

Singles

Year	Single	Chart positions	
Year	Single	US Billboard Hot 100	US R&B
1976	"Message in Our Music"	49	1
1976	"Darlin' Darlin' Baby (Sweet, Tender, Love)"	72	1

== Certifications ==
Region	Certification	Certified units/sales
United States (RIAA)	Gold	500,000^{^}
^{^} Shipments figures based on certification alone.
