= Cowboys to Girls =

Single by The Intruders

from the album Cowboys to Girls
- B-side: "Turn the Hands of Time"
- Released: 1968
- Recorded: 1967
- Genre: R&B, Philadelphia soul
- Length: 2:37
- Label: Gamble
- Songwriters: Kenny Gamble, Leon Huff
- Producers: Kenny Gamble, Leon Huff

The Intruders singles chronology
"A Love That's Real" (1967)	"Cowboys to Girls" (1968)	"(Love Is Like A) Baseball Game" (1968)

"Cowboys to Girls" is a 1968 R&B single written by Kenny Gamble and Leon Huff and performed by The Intruders. The single was a crossover hit becoming The Intruders' first Top 40 single. "Cowboys to Girls" was also The Intruders' only #1 song on the R&B singles chart. and a Top 10 smash on the Billboard Hot 100, peaking at #6, making it the biggest hit of The Intruders' career.

== Pop culture references ==
- In 1980, Chicano Rock group Tierra interpolated a few lines from the lyrics of "Cowboys to Girls" for their version of The Intruders' Top 10 R&B hit "Together".
- Mos Def incorporated some of the lyrics for the song "Pistola" on his album The Ecstatic.
- The "Duke Of Earl" Gene Chandler, in 1968, did a cover.
- Canadian music group Sweet Blindness produced a rendition in 1975.
- The song was also featured in the 1995 film Dead Presidents.
- The song was featured in an episode of the 2021 TV Series The Wonder Years.

== Chart positions ==
Chart (1968)	Peak position
U.S. Billboard Hot 100	6
U.S. Billboard Hot Black Singles	1
