= No Can Do (disambiguation) =

"No Can Do" is a 2008 song by British girl group Sugababes.

No Can Do may also refer to:

- "No Can Do", a 1945 song by Charles Tobias and Nat Simon
- No Can Do, a 2012 album by Ladyhawk
- "No Can Do", a song by rapper Keak da Sneak from his 2005 album Contact Sport
- "No Can Do", a song by the O'Jays from their 1993 album Heartbreaker
- "No Can Do", a song by Mark Knopfler from his 1996 album Golden Heart
- "No Can Do", a song by the Nightingales from their 1986 album In the Good Old Country Way

== See also ==
- "I Can't Go for That (No Can Do)", a 1981 song by the American duo Hall and Oates
