= Darlin' Darlin' Baby (Sweet, Tender, Love) =

"Darlin' Darlin' Baby (Sweet, Tender, Lover)"

Single by The O'Jays

from the album Message in the Music
- B-side: "A Prayer"
- Released: 1976
- Genre: R&B, Philly soul
- Length: 4:19
- Label: Philadelphia International
- Songwriter: Kenny Gamble & Leon Huff
- Producers: Kenny Gamble & Leon Huff

The O'Jays singles chronology
"Message in Our Music" (1976)	"Darlin' Darlin' Baby (Sweet, Tender, Lover)" (1976)	"Work on Me" (1977)

"Darlin' Darlin' Baby (Sweet, Tender, Love)" was a hit song by R&B vocal trio The O'Jays released in late 1976 and written and produced by Kenny Gamble & Leon Huff.

Released as the follow-up single to "Message in Our Music", it was their second number-one R&B single from the album Message in the Music, and peaking at number 72 on the Billboard Hot 100.

== Charts ==
Chart	Peak position
US Billboard Hot 100	72
US Billboard Hot Soul Singles	1
UK Singles Chart	24

== Samples ==
In 1997, Bronx born rapper Big Pun sampled "Darlin' Darlin' Baby" for the first version of his breakout hit "I'm Not a Player". The O'Jays make a cameo in the music video.
