= Live! Coast to Coast =

Live album by Teddy Pendergrass
- Released: November 23, 1979
- Recorded: 1978–1979
- Genre: R&B, soul
- Length: 73:43 (2 Discs)
- Label: Philadelphia International
- Producer: Kenneth Gamble, Leon Huff, Jerry Cohen, Gene McFadden, John Whitehead

Teddy Pendergrass chronology
Teddy (1979)	Live! Coast to Coast (1979)	TP (1980)

Singles from Live! Coast to Coast
- 1. "Shout and Scream / Close the Door (Live Version)" Released: November 21, 1979; 2. "It's You I Love / Where Did All the Lovin' Go" Released: February 12, 1980

Professional ratings
Review scores
Source	Rating
AllMusic	2/5 stars
Christgau's Record Guide	C

Live! Coast to Coast is a live album by the R&B crooner Teddy Pendergrass. It was recorded in Philadelphia in 1978 and Los Angeles in 1979. It did well on the Billboard album charts, reaching No. 33 Pop and No. 5 R&B.

== Track listing ==
All tracks composed by Kenny Gamble and Leon Huff; except where indicated

Disc 1

1. "Life Is a Song Worth Singing" (Thom Bell, Linda Creed)
2. "Only You"
3. Medley: "If You Don't Know Me by Now/The Love I Lost/Bad Luck/Wake Up Everybody" (Victor Carstarphen, Kenny Gamble, Leon Huff, Gene McFadden, John Whitehead)
4. "When Somebody Loves You Back"
5. "Get Up, Get Down, Get Funky, Get Loose"

Disc 2

1. "L.A. Rap"
2. "Come Go with Me"
3. "Close the Door"
4. "Turn Off the Lights"
5. "Do Me"
6. Live Interview with Mimi Brown of WDAS-FM, Philadelphia
7. "It's You I Love"
8. Live Interview
9. "Shout and Scream"
10. Live Interview Concludes

== Personnel ==
- Teddy Pendergrass - vocals
- Bobby Eli, Robert "Wawa" Le Grand - guitar
- Jimmy Williams, Norman Smith, Philip McClelland - bass
- Jerry Cohen, Leon Ware - keyboards
- Alfie Pollitt - piano
- Lenny Pakula - organ
- Cecil Du Valle - organ, clavinet, synthesizer
- James Carter, Keith Benson, Quinton Joseph - drums
- Gregory L. Moore, David Cruse - percussion
- Sam Reed - saxophone, flute
- Arthur T. Pugh Jr., Louis Opalesky Jr., Sylvester Bryant - trumpet, flugelhorn
- Joseph A. Kohanski Jr. - trombone
- John Petrella, Peter M. Kucirko - cello
- Emma Kummrow, Florence Rosensweig, Grace S. Babogh, Richard E. Jones, Roger J. Harrington, Thomas Di Sarlo - violin
- Sharon Ray, Susan M. Leon - viola
- Barbara Ingram, Carla Benson, Evette, Benton, Harriet Tharp, Melva Story, Sherry Williams - backing vocals
- Karat Faye - Engineer @ Record Plant L.A.

== Charts ==
Chart (1979)	Peak
U.S. Billboard Top LPs	33
U.S. Billboard Top Soul LPs	5

Singles

Year	Single	Peak chart positions
Year	Single	US R&B
1979	"Shout and Scream"	21
1980	"It's You I Love"	44
