= So Full of Love =

Studio album by the O'Jays
- Released: 1978
- Recorded: 1977–1978
- Studios: Sigma Sound, Philadelphia, Pennsylvania
- Genre: R&B
- Length: 38:32
- Label: Philadelphia International
- Producers: Kenneth Gamble, Leon Huff, Thom Bell, Dennis Williams, Eddie Levert, Walter Williams, Bunny Sigler

The O'Jays chronology
Travelin' at the Speed of Thought (1977)	So Full of Love (1978)	Identify Yourself (1979)

So Full of Love is the twelfth studio album by the O'Jays, released in 1978 by Philadelphia International. The album contains the No. 1 R&B hit "Use ta Be My Girl", and was awarded RIAA platinum certification for sales of 1,000,000 copies.

The single "Brandy" has long been speculated by many fans to be about a woman. However, in 2013, production team Gamble and Huff revealed the song was written about a dog.

== Critical reception ==
Professional ratings
Review scores
Source	Rating
AllMusic	3/5 stars
Christgau's Record Guide	C+
The Virgin Encyclopedia of R&B and Soul	3/5 stars

The Bay State Banner praised "the O'Jays' best harmonizing since 'I'll Be Sweeter Tomorrow' and their most casual smoochie lyrics in nearly that many years."

== Track listing ==
Tracks 1–3 written by Kenneth Gamble and Leon Huff; all others as noted.

Side one

1. "Sing My Heart Out" - 4:25
2. "Use ta Be My Girl" - 4:02
3. "Cry Together" - 5:36
4. "This Time Baby" (Casey James, LeRoy Bell) - 4:43

Side two

1. "Brandy" (Joseph B. Jefferson, Charles B. Simmons) - 4:14
2. "Take Me to the Stars" (Larry Hancock, Al Boyd) - 4:13
3. "Help (Somebody Please)" (Eddie Levert, Robert Dukes) - 4:58
4. "Strokety Stroke" (Bunny Sigler) - 4:24

== Personnel ==
- Kenneth Gamble - producer (tracks 1–3), songwriter
- Dennis Harris - guitar
- Bobby Eli - guitar
- Roland Chambers - guitar
- Bunny Sigler - guitar, keyboards, piano, producer (track 8)
- Norman Harris - arranger, guitar
- Ron Baker - bass guitar
- Eddie Levert - vocals, songwriter, producer (tracks 6, 7)
- Sammy Strain - vocals
- Walter Williams - vocals, producer (tracks 6, 7)
- Lenny Pakula - keyboards
- Leon Huff - keyboards, producer (tracks 1–3), piano, songwriter
- Earl Young - drums
- Don Renaldo - conductor, horn, strings
- Thom Bell - arranger, strings, producer (tracks 4, 5), songwriter
- Dennis Williams - arranger, producer (tracks 6, 7)
- Larry Washington - bongos, percussion
- Vincent Montana Jr. - percussion, vibraphone
- Tony Sellari - art direction
- Bobby Martin - arranger

== Charts ==
=== Weekly charts ===
Chart (1978)	Peak position
US Billboard 200	6
US Top R&B/Hip-Hop Albums (Billboard)	1

=== Year-end charts ===
Chart (1978)	Position
US Billboard 200	51
US Top R&B/Hip-Hop Albums (Billboard)	5

=== Singles ===
Year	Single	Chart positions	
Year	Single	US	US R&B
1978	"Brandy (I Really Miss You)"	79	21
1978	"Use ta Be My Girl"	4	1

== See also ==
- List of Billboard number-one R&B albums of 1978
