= Livin' for the Weekend (The O'Jays song) =

Single by The O'Jays

from the album Family Reunion
- B-side: "Stairway to Heaven"
- Released: February 1976
- Studio: Sigma Sound, Philadelphia, Pennsylvania
- Genre: R&B, Philly soul, disco
- Length: 2:50 (single edit); 6:35 (album version)
- Label: Philadelphia International
- Songwriter(s): Kenny Gamble, Cary Gilbert, Leon Huff
- Producer(s): Kenny Gamble & Leon Huff

The O'Jays singles chronology
"I Love Music" (1975)	"Livin' for the Weekend" (1976)	"Family Reunion" (1976)

"Livin' for the Weekend" is a song by American R&B vocal group The O'Jays, released as the second single from their 11th album, Family Reunion (1975). It spent two weeks at #1 on the R&B singles chart in the spring of '76. It was also successful on the pop charts, peaking at #20 on the Billboard Hot 100. The B-side of the single, "Stairway to Heaven," proved to be just as popular.

== Chart positions ==
Charts	Peak position
US Billboard Hot 100	20
US Billboard Hot Soul Singles	1
