= Heartbreaker (The O'Jays album) =

Studio album by the O'Jays
- Released: July 27, 1993
- Recorded: 1993
- Genres: R&B, soul
- Length: 50:47
- Label: EMI
- Producers: Gerald Levert, Edwin Nicholas

The O'Jays chronology
Emotionally Yours (1991)	Heartbreaker (1993)	Love You to Tears (1997)

Heartbreaker is an album by the American R&B group the O'Jays. It was released in 1993 on EMI.

The album peaked at No. 75 on the Billboard 200.

== Production ==
Gerald Levert, Eddie Levert's son, cowrote and produced two of the album's songs. Heartbreaker was the only album with Nathaniel Best, who had replaced Sammy Strain.

== Critical reception ==
Professional ratings
Review scores
Source	Rating
AllMusic	3/5 stars
Chicago Sun-Times	2.5/4 stars
The Encyclopedia of Popular Music	2/5 stars
The Indianapolis Star	3/4 stars

AllMusic wrote that "many numbers aren't much different from the classic material that made them superstars in the '70s; that's both part of the music's charm and something that might trouble fans hoping the group would experiment with the vocal arrangements as well as the production." The Washington Post thought that the album "makes up in savvy arrangements what it lacks in well-crafted lyrics, but its real appeal lies in the still smooth Philly soul harmonies and [Eddie] Levert's gritty testifying." The St. Petersburg Times wrote that "while the CD is filled with gorgeous harmonies and melodies, the vocal performances sometimes are almost spoiled by tinny-sounding mechanical tracks with programed electronic drums."

== Track listing ==
1. "Cryin' the Blues" (Edwin Nicholas, Gerald Levert) - 5:59
2. "One Wonderful Girl" (Alan Gordon) - 4:28
3. "Somebody Else Will" (Edwin Nicholas, Gerald Levert) - 6:27
4. "Show Me the Right Way" (Dwain Mitchell, Eddie Levert, Walter Williams) - 5:25
5. "Trouble" (Dwain Mitchell, Eddie Levert, Walter Williams) - 4:11
6. "Can't Let You Go" (Dwain Mitchell, Eddie Levert, Sherena Wynn, Walter Williams) - 4:10
7. "Decisions" (Dwain Mitchell, Eddie Levert, Sherena Wynn, Walter Williams) - 4:20
8. "No Can Do" (Dwain Mitchell, Eddie Levert, Sherena Wynn, Walter Williams) - 4:21
9. "Heartbreaker" (Dwain Mitchell, Eddie Levert, Sherena Wynn, Walter Williams) - 4:27
10. "He Loves You" (Dwain Mitchell, Eddie Levert, Walter Williams) - 7:59
