= Rock and Soul =

Rock and Soul may refer to:

- Rock'n Soul (Everly Brothers album), a 1965 album by the Everly Brothers
- Rock 'n Soul (Solomon Burke album), a 1964 album by Solomon Burke
- Rock 'n Soul Part 1, 1983 compilation album by Hall & Oates
