= Message in Our Music =

Single by The O'Jays

from the album Message in the Music
- B-side: "She's Only a Woman"
- Released: 1976
- Genre: Disco
- Length: 3:21 (single version); 6:20 (album version)
- Label: Philadelphia International
- Songwriter: Kenny Gamble & Leon Huff
- Producers: Kenny Gamble & Leon Huff

The O'Jays singles chronology
"Family Reunion" (1976)	"Message in Our Music" (1976)	"Darlin' Darlin' Baby (Sweet, Tender, Love)" (1976)

"Message In Our Music" was a hit song for the R&B vocal group The O'Jays in 1976 from their album Message in the Music. Written by famed songwriters Kenny Gamble and Leon Huff, it spent a week at number one on the R&B singles chart in October, 1976, and peaked at number forty-nine on the Billboard Hot 100 singles chart.

== Chart history ==
Chart (1976)	Peak position
Canada RPM Top Singles	100
U.S. Billboard Hot 100	49
U.S. Billboard Hot Soul Singles	1
