= Give the People What They Want (The O'Jays song) =

Single by The O'Jays

from the album Survival
- B-side: "What Am I Waiting For"
- Released: 1975
- Studio: Sigma Sound, Philadelphia, Pennsylvania
- Genre: R&B, Philly soul
- Length: 4:11
- Label: Philadelphia International
- Songwriter(s): Kenny Gamble & Leon Huff
- Producer(s): Kenny Gamble & Leon Huff

The O'Jays singles chronology
"Sunshine (Pt. 2)" (1974)	"Give the People What They Want" (1975)	"Let Me Make Love to You" (1975)

"Give the People What They Want" is a 1975 song written by Kenny Gamble & Leon Huff and performed R&B vocal group The O'Jays. Gamble & Huff also produced the track and was a release from the O'Jays album Survival.

== Charts ==
"Give the People What They Want" spent one week at number one on the R&B singles chart in the summer of 1975. It peaked at number 45 on the Billboard Hot 100.

Chart (1975)	Peak position
US Billboard Hot 100	45
US Billboard Hot Soul Singles	1

== Use in media ==
- The song was used in the King of the Hill season 12 episode "Trans-Fascism" over a montage of the Sugarfoot's Express truck competing with Rooster's Roost and evading the news crew.
- The song is currently being used by NBC's WCAU-TV-10 to promote the station's news and other programming. The chorus plays with no other voice-over, along with clips of action in the streets, and station on-air staff with slogans promoting programming. The campaign debuted on 12 February 2010, including a clip of Jay Leno at 11:35, after The Tonight Show with Conan O'Brien was off the air.
- The song is used as the intro theme music for former NBA player Jalen Rose's, and ESPN Employee David Jacoby podcast Jalen & Jacoby, for ESPN. The phrase has become Rose's unofficial catchphrase.
- The song was also used in a Samsung smartphone TV commercial in February 2017, and then an American Express commercial the following year.
- The song appears in the video game Grand Theft Auto IV in the fictional radio station International Funk 99.
- In 2022, Liam Gallagher finished his stadium concerts by playing the song over the PA speakers as he left the stage.
- On the 25th of August 2024, Liam Gallagher finished his set at Reading Festival and the song was played over the PA whilst a short video with the texts '27.08.2024' and '8am' was shown in the Oasis style font. It would late be announced that the band would be performing an array of shows in the UK and Ireland in 2025.

== Sampling ==
- This song is heavily sampled in EPMD's song "Give the People" from their 1990 album Business as Usual.

== Use in political campaigns ==
It was used as part of the regular playlist at campaign events for Barack Obama's 2008 presidential candidacy.
