= One Night Affair =

1969 song by The O'Jays

Single by The O'Jays

from the album The O'Jays In Philadelphia
- Released: 1969
- Studio: Sigma Sound, Philadelphia, Pennsylvania
- Genre: R&B, disco, funk, soul
- Length: 2:17
- Label: Neptune Records
- Composer(s): Kenny Gamble, Leon Huff
- Producer(s): Thom Bell, Bobby Martin

"One Night Affair" is a 1969 song by the O'Jays. It was released on the Neptune Records label. It is cited as one of the first disco songs.

== Chart performance ==
Chart (1969)	Peak position
US Billboard Hot 100	68
US Billboard Best Selling Soul Singles	15

== Jerry Butler version ==
"One Night Affair"

Single by Jerry Butler
- Released: 4 November 1972
- Genre: Soul, funk, disco
- Composer(s): Kenny Gamble, Leon Huff

In 1972, Jerry Butler released a cover of the song.

== Asha Puthli version ==
Asha Puthli recorded a cover of this song on her 1975 second solo album titled "She Loves to Hear the Music" released on the CBS Columbia Label.
