= Use ta Be My Girl =

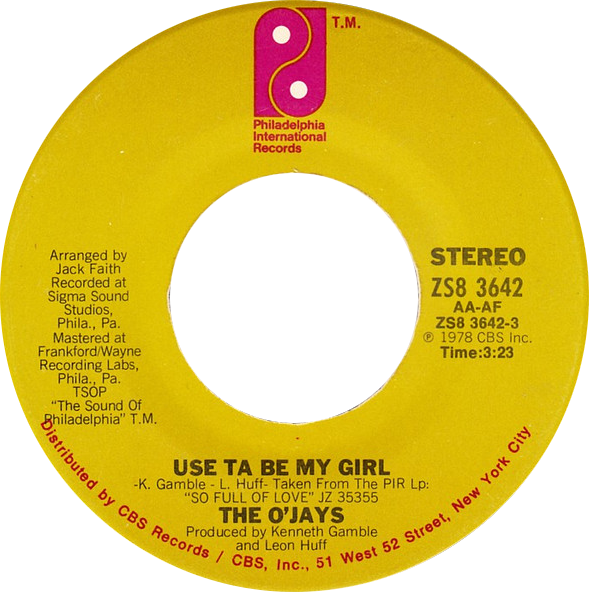
- One of side-A labels of the US single

Single by The O'Jays

from the album So Full of Love
- B-side: "This Time Baby"
- Released: March 1978
- Studio: Sigma Sound, Philadelphia, Pennsylvania
- Genre: Soul; disco; quiet storm
- Length: 3:23 (7" Version); 4:02 (Album Version)
- Label: Philadelphia International
- Songwriter: Kenny Gamble & Leon Huff
- Producers: Kenny Gamble & Leon Huff

The O'Jays singles chronology
"Work on Me" (1977)	"Use ta Be My Girl" (1978)	"Brandy" (1979)

"Use ta Be My Girl" is a song by R&B vocal group The O'Jays. Released from their hit 1978 album, So Full of Love, it became a crossover hit. The song spent five weeks at number one on the R&B singles chart. It also peaked at number four on the Billboard Hot 100 singles chart. "Use ta Be My Girl" became one of the biggest and most familiar hits by The O'Jays. The song has also been certified by the RIAA as a million-seller.

== Chart performance ==
=== Weekly charts ===
Chart (1978)	Peak position
Australia (Kent Music Report)	41
Canada RPM Top Singles	90
Canada RPM Adult Contemporary	28
Ireland (IRMA)	18
Netherlands	18
New Zealand (RIANZ)	5
UK Singles Chart	12
US Billboard Hot 100	4
US Cash Box Top 100	5
US Billboard Hot Soul Singles	1
US Billboard Adult Contemporary	21

=== Year-end charts ===
Chart (1978)	Rank
New Zealand	30
US Billboard Hot 100	42
US Cash Box	43
