= Love Train =

1972 single by the O'Jays

- Cover of the German and Dutch release of the single by Epic

Single by the O'Jays

from the album Back Stabbers
- B-side: "Who Am I"
- Released: December 20, 1972
- Recorded: Summer 1971 – 1972
- Studio: Sigma Sound, Philadelphia, Pennsylvania
- Genre: Proto-disco; pop
- Length: 2:59 (album version); 6:15 (extended version)
- Label: Philadelphia International
- Songwriters: Kenneth Gamble, Leon Huff
- Producers: Kenneth Gamble, Leon Huff

The O'Jays singles chronology
"992 Arguments" (1972)	"Love Train" (1972)	"Time to Get Down" (1973)

Music video
- "Love Train" (Official Soul Train Video) on YouTube

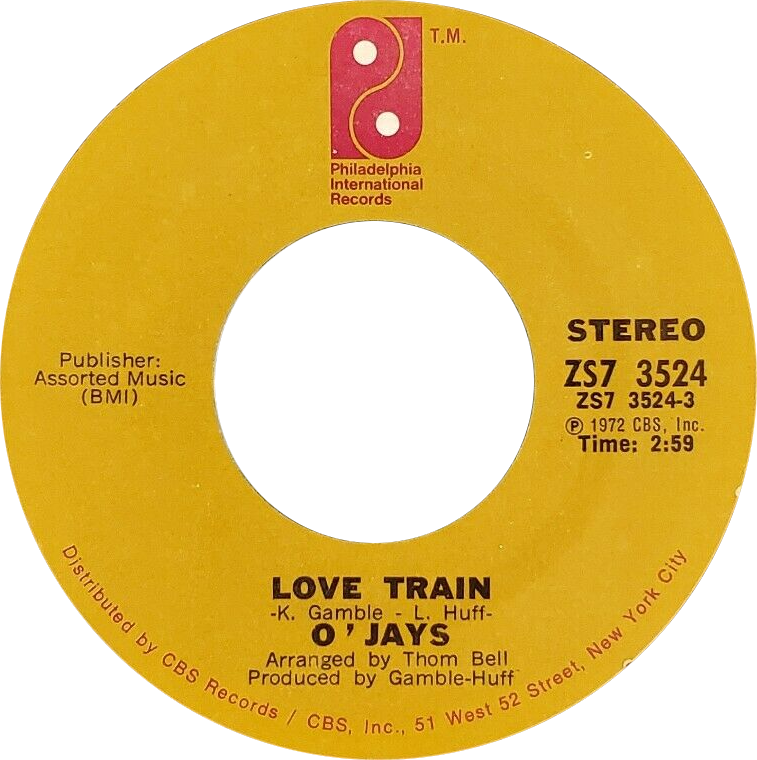
Side A of the US single

"Love Train" is a hit single by the O'Jays, written by Gamble and Huff for the O'Jays' 1972 album Back Stabbers. Recorded at Sigma Sound Studios in Philadelphia, the house band MFSB provided backing. The song has been considered one of the first disco songs.

"Love Train" entered the Billboard Hot 100's top 40 on January 27, 1973, the same day that the Paris Peace Accords were signed. The song's lyrics of unity mention a number of countries, including England, Russia, China, Egypt, and Israel, as well as the continent of Africa. It reached No. 1 on both the R&B Singles and the Hot 100 in February and March 1973, respectively, and No. 9 on the UK singles chart and was certified gold by the RIAA. It was the O'Jays' first and only number one record on the US pop chart.

The single was a 2006 inductee into the Grammy Hall of Fame.

== Reception ==
Record World said of the single release that the "tune chugs right along with a Gamble and a Huff" and could become the biggest hit from the Back Stabbers album.

== Music video ==
The music video shows a group of people forming a human chain near a railroad station, while at the same time, some railroad cars are shown in motion. Throughout the video, more people join in the chain, which they call the "Love Train". It was recorded in 1973.

== Charts ==
=== Weekly charts ===
Chart (1972–1973)	Peak position
Australia KMR	91
Canada RPM Top Singles	15
Ireland (IRMA)	19
UK singles chart	9
US Billboard Hot 100	1
US Billboard R&B	1
US Cash Box Top 100	1

=== Year-end charts ===
Chart (1973)	Rank
Canada	117
US Billboard Hot 100	32
US Cash Box Top 100	12

== Certifications ==
Region	Certification	Certified units/sales
United Kingdom (BPI)	Gold	400,000^{‡}
United States (RIAA)	Gold	1,000,000^{^}
^{^} Shipments figures based on certification alone.^{‡} Sales+streaming figures based on certification alone.

== Cover versions ==
In 2006, Mötley Crüe drummer Tommy Lee performed "Love Train" for the ending credits of Final Destination 3.

== In popular culture ==
In the 1998 film, The Last Days of Disco, the song is featured in the final scene and credits.

The song was featured in the popular long-running Coors Light series of commercials featuring the Silver Bullet Express train from approximately 2005 to 2011, returning as a Super Bowl and March Madness ad in 2024.

== See also ==
- List of anti-war songs
- List of Billboard Hot 100 number-one singles of 1973
