= Eddie Levert =

American singer (born 1942)

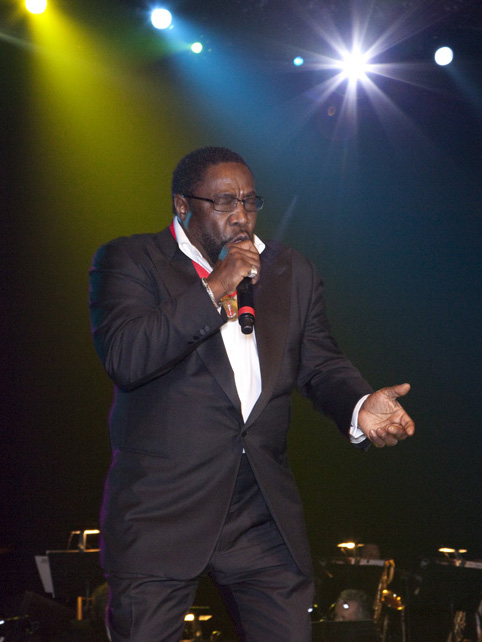
- Levert performing at the 2010 Alabama Music Hall of Fame concert

Background information
- Born: Edward Wills Levert; June 16, 1942 (age 84); Bessemer, Alabama, U.S.
- Genres: R&B; soul; gospel; disco
- Occupations: Singer; songwriter
- Years active: 1958–present
- Labels: EMI; Philadelphia Int'l; Columbia; Twenty Two Recordings

Edward Willis Levert (born June 16, 1942) is an American singer best known as the lead vocalist of the O'Jays. He is the father of sons Edward Jr (born 1964), Gerald (1966–2006) and Sean Levert (1968–2008) and daughter Ryan Levert (2002–2024).

== Biography ==
Levert was born in Bessemer, Alabama, and was raised in Canton, Ohio, where he moved at the age of six. He attended church regularly and eventually joined the church choir. As Levert continued singing into his teenage years, he became a recognized voice in the church choir, sang in school plays and performed regularly on a gospel radio show.

While at high school, he teamed up with classmates Walter Williams, William Powell, Bobby Massey and Bill Isles to form a group called the Triumphs. The Triumphs played locally in Canton opening for different acts, playing 'sock hops'. They traveled to Cincinnati to canvas King Records whose President Sid Nathan changed their name to The Mascots and signed them to his label. The Mascots' popularity grew as their music was broadcast on Cleveland radio stations.

In 1969, The O'Jays signed with Philadelphia International Records where they began to release records under the new label. The O'Jays later signed with EMI-Manhattan Records and Levert and Williams began co-writing and producing their own tracks. Their EMI debut album, "Let Me Touch You", went to number three R&B and included "Lovin' You", which became a number-one R&B hit in the summer of 1987.

In 1984, Levert's two sons Gerald and Sean, both still in high school, announced that they wanted to follow their father's musical background. They met Marc Gordon recording under the group name LeVert – four of their seven albums went platinum. In 1992 Eddie and son Gerald recorded "Baby Hold On to Me", which was a No. 1 R&B hit and reached No. 37 on the Pop charts.

In 2006, upon returning from a South African tour with sons Gerald and Sean, Eddie's son Gerald died due to interactions between his prescribed medications. In 2007, Eddie and son Gerald's album recorded in 2006, "Something to Talk About", was released followed by the publication of the book I Got Your Back, co-authored by Eddie and son Gerald. In 2008, Eddie's son Sean died as a result of being denied needed prescription medication by government officials in Ohio. Later in 2008, Eddie and his late son Gerald were presented with "Best Duo or Group" Image Award. In 2009, The O'Jays were awarded BET's "Lifetime Achievement Award" and Eddie Levert was honored with the "Heroes and Legends Pacesetter Award". On January 29, 2011, The O'Jays received the "Trumpet Lifetime Achievement Award". Throughout Eddie Levert's career, The O'Jays have released ten Gold Albums, with nine eventually going Platinum and ten No. 1 hits.

Levert is still performing and touring with The O'Jays, as well as performing as a solo artist.

== Albums ==
Year	Album	Peak chart positions		Certifications
Year	Album	US	US R&B	Certifications
1995	Father and Son (with Gerald Levert)	20	2	RIAA: Gold
2007	Something to Talk About	19	5	
2012	I Still Have It	—	43	
2016	Did I Make You Go Ooh	—	—	
"—" denotes releases that did not chart.				
