= Bunny Sigler =

American songwriter (1941–2017)

- Born: Walter Sigler; March 27, 1941; Philadelphia, Pennsylvania, U.S.
- Died: October 6, 2017 (aged 76) Philadelphia, Pennsylvania, U.S.
- Genres: Soul, R&B, pop, Northern soul
- Labels: Parkway, Gold Mind, Philadelphia International, Curtom

Walter "Bunny" Sigler (March 27, 1941 – October 6, 2017) was an American R&B singer, songwriter, multi-instrumentalist and record producer who did extensive work with the team of Kenny Gamble and Leon Huff, and was instrumental in creating the "Philly Sound" in the early 1970s.

== Career ==
Sigler was born on March 17, 1941, in Philadelphia, and was nicknamed "Bunny" by his family as a young child. He sang in churches, and joined several local doo-wop groups, including the Opals, in which he sang with his brother James Sigler, Ritchie Rome and Jack Faith. By the late 1950s, he had started performing in local venues as a singer and pianist, and he first recorded for the V-Tone Records label in 1959. Leon Huff then recommended him to record producers John Medora and Dave White at Cameo-Parkway Records. His second single for the Parkway label, a medley of two Shirley and Lee hits, "Let the Good Times Roll & Feel So Good", rose on both the national pop and R&B charts, reaching #20 R&B and #22 pop in 1967. The follow-up, another medley, this time of two doo-wop songs, "Lovey Dovey"/"You're So Fine", also reached the R&B chart in the same year.

After Cameo-Parkway folded, around 1970 Sigler began working as a songwriter with Kenny Gamble and Leon Huff at Philadelphia International Records. In partnership with writer Phil Hurtt, Sigler wrote songs for the O'Jays including "Sunshine" and "When the World Is at Peace". He also wrote songs solo and with Gamble, and his compositions were recorded by many of the Philadelphia International artistes. He discovered a group, Instant Funk, and began again recording as a singer. He had his first chart success for six years in 1973 with a remake of the Bobby Lewis hit "Tossin' and Turnin'" (#38 R&B, #97 pop), and had several further minor R&B chart hits on Philadelphia International in the mid-1970s, including his version of "Love Train", and "Keep Smilin'". He also released several albums in the mid-1970s, on which he was backed by the MFSB musicians as well as Instant Funk.

Sigler continued to work as a songwriter and producer for artistes including the Whispers, Ecstasy, Passion & Pain, Carl Carlton, Jackie Moore, Harold Melvin & the Blue Notes, The Roots, Billy Paul, Lou Rawls, Patti LaBelle, Stephanie Mills and Curtis Mayfield. He also appeared on "Soul Train" where he sang his song, "That's How Long I'll Be Loving You", and released a duo album with Barbara Mason. In 1977, he moved to the Gold Mind label, set up by MFSB musician Norman Harris and distributed by Salsoul Records. There, he had his biggest R&B hit, reaching #8 in early 1978 with "Let Me Party With You (Party, Party, Party)". He also continued to work with Instant Funk on their breakthrough hit "I Got My Mind Made Up (You Can Get It Girl)", and with other acts on Salsoul. In 1978, his recording with Loleatta Holloway, "Only You", reached #11 on the national R&B chart and #87 on the pop chart.

From the 1980s, Sigler continued to write and produce for musicians including Patti LaBelle, and Shirley Jones of the Jones Girls. He sang the 23rd Psalm at the ceremony awarding the Congressional Gold Medal to the Tuskegee Airmen on March 29, 2007, at the United States Capitol. He also co-wrote "The Ruler's Back", the opening song on the album The Blueprint by Jay-Z.

Sigler died of a heart attack on October 6, 2017, aged 76, in Philadelphia.

== Discography ==
=== Studio albums ===
- 1967: Let the Good Times Roll & Feel So Good (Parkway PS-50,000)
- 1974: That's How Long I'll Be Loving You (Philadelphia International)
- 1975: Keep Smilin' (Philadelphia International)
- 1976: My Music (Philadelphia International)
- 1977: Locked in This Position (with Barbara Mason)
- 1977: Let Me Party with You (Gold Mind)
- 1979: I've Always Wanted to Sing ... Not Just Write Songs (Gold Mind)
- 1980: Let It Snow (Sal-Soul)
- 2003: Let Me Love You Tonight (Grapevine Records)
- 2008: The Lord's Prayer (101 Distribution)
- 2012: From Bunny with Love and a Little Soul (Bun-Z Music & Records)
- 2012: When You're in Love at Christmas Time (Bun-Z Music & Records)
- 2015: Bundino (Bun-Z Music & Records)

=== Compilation albums ===
- 1996: The Best of Bunny Sigler: Sweeter Than the Berry (Sony/Legacy)
- 1998: Bunny Sigler (Sony Special Products)
- 2006: The Best of Philly Soul — Vol. 2 (That Philly Sound)
- 2007: A Soulful Tale of Two Cities (Soul Renaissance Records)

Songs performed by Sigler appear on 53 compilations

=== Singles ===
- 1965: "For Crying Out Loud" US Decca
- 1966: "Comparatively Speaking" US Decca
- 1966: "Will You Still Love Me Tomorrow" US Decca
- 1966: "Girl Don't Make Me Wait"
- 1967: "Let the Good Times Roll & Feel So Good" (#22 pop, #20 R&B)
- 1967: "Lovey Dovey / You're So Fine" (#86 pop)
- 1967: "Follow Your Heart" / "Can You Dig It"
- 1967: "There's No Love Left (In This Old Heart of Mine)"
- 1970: "Don't Stop Doing What You're Doing"
- 1970: "Where Do the Lonely Go"
- 1972: "Heaven Knows I've Changed"
- 1973: "Theme for Five Fingers of Death"
- 1973: "Tossin' and Turnin'" (#97 pop, #38 R&B)
- 1974: "Love Train (Part 1)" (#28 R&B)
- 1974: "Keep Smilin'" (#46 R&B)
- 1975: "Shake Your Booty"
- 1976: "My Music" (#98 R&B)
- 1977: "Let Me Party with You (Party, Party, Party)" (#43 pop, #8 R&B)
- 1977: "Locked in This Position" (with Barbara Mason)
- 1978: "I Got What You Need" (#42 R&B)
- 1978: "Only You" (with Loleatta Holloway) (#87 pop, #11 R&B)
- 1978: "Don't Even Try (Give It Up)" (#94 R&B)
- 1979: "By the Way You Dance (I Knew It Was You)" (#37 R&B)
- 1979: "Glad to Be Your Lover"
- 1986: "What Would You Do Without Love"
- 2001: "Are You a Freak (Like Me?)" (with Prince Dred)
- 2007: "Got to Give It Up"
- 2015: "When I Think of You"
- 2015: "Buttermilk and Cornbread"
- 2016: "Lavada"
