= The O'Jays =

American R&B group from Ohio

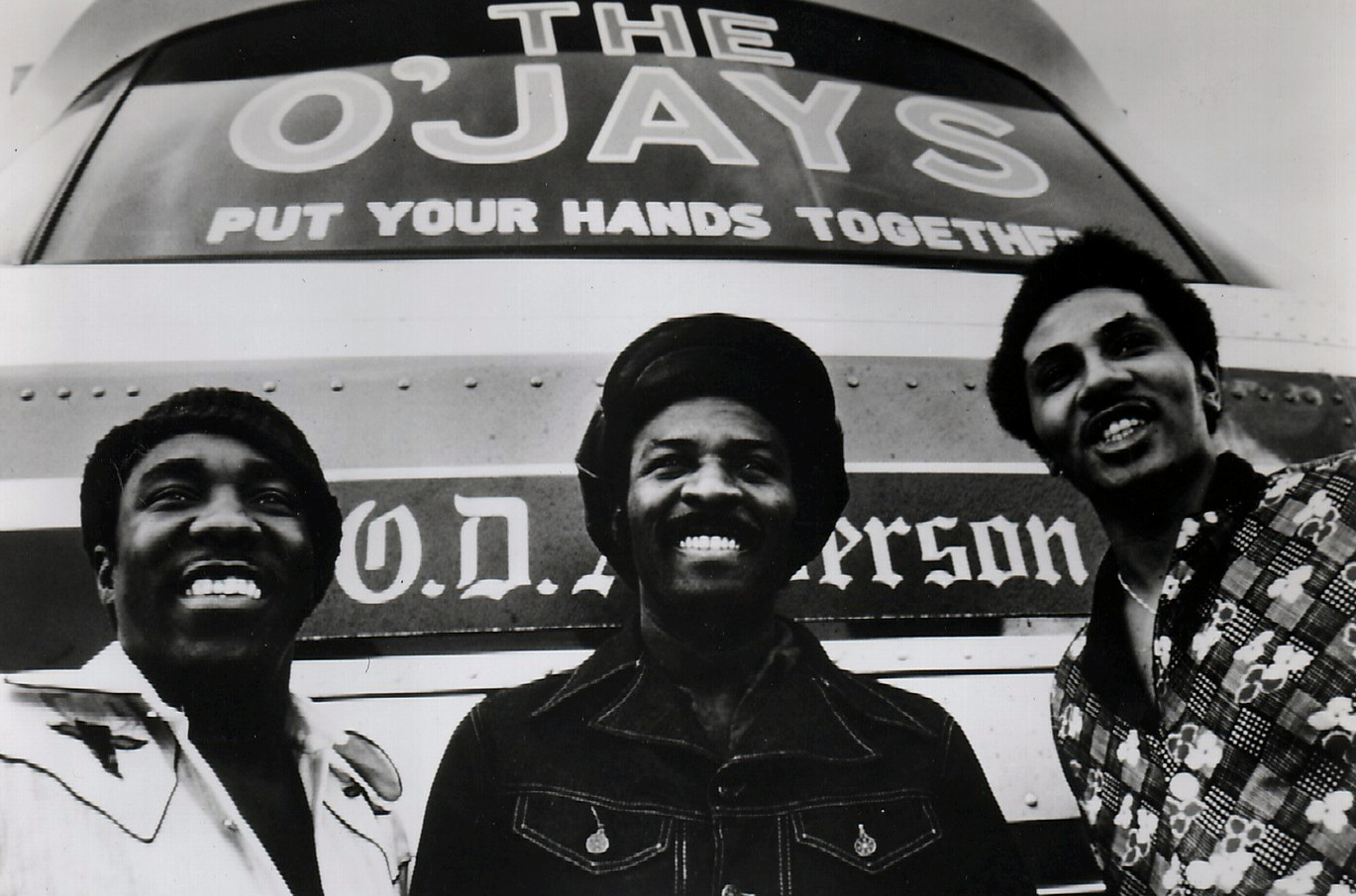
- The O'Jays in 1974. Left to right: Eddie Levert, Walter Williams and William Powell

Background information
- Also known as: The Triumphs, The Mascots
- Origin: Canton, Ohio, U.S.
- Genres: Philadelphia soul; progressive soul; disco
- Years active: 1958–present
- Labels: Minit, Philadelphia International, MCA
- Members: Eddie Levert; Walter Williams; Eric Grant
- Past members: William Powell; Bobby Massey; Bill Isles; Frank "Frankie" Little; Sammy Strain; Nathaniel Best
- Website: mightyojays.com

The O'Jays are an American R&B group from Canton, Ohio, formed in summer 1958 and originally consisting of Eddie Levert, Walter Lee Williams, William Powell, Bobby Massey, and Bill Isles. The O'Jays made their first chart appearance with the minor hit "Lonely Drifter" in 1963, but reached their greatest level of success once the producers Gamble & Huff signed them to their Philadelphia International label in 1971. With Gamble & Huff, the O'Jays (now a trio after the departure of Isles and Massey) emerged at the forefront of Philadelphia soul with "Back Stabbers" (1972), and topped the U.S. Billboard Hot 100 the following year with "Love Train". Several other U.S. R&B hits followed, and the O'Jays were inducted into the Vocal Group Hall of Fame in 2004, The Rock and Roll Hall of Fame in 2005, and the Rhythm and Blues Music Hall of Fame in 2013.

== History ==
The group was formed in Canton, Ohio, in 1958 while its members (Eddie Levert, Walter Lee Williams, William Powell, Bobby Massey, and Bill Isles) were attending Canton McKinley High School. Originally known as The Mascots, and then The Triumphs, the friends began recording with "Miracles" in 1961, which was a moderate hit in the Cleveland area. In 1963, they took the name 'The O'Jays', in tribute to Cleveland radio disc jockey Eddie O'Jay, who was part of the powerful management team of Frankie Crocker, Herb Hamlett, and O'Jay. In 1963, the group saw the release of their song "Lonely Drifter," their first entry on the Billboard Hot 100. The single peaked at number 93. Their debut album, Comin' Through, was released shortly thereafter.

Throughout the 1960s, the group continued to chart with minor hits such as "Lipstick Traces" (which they performed nationally on the syndicated television program Shivaree), "Stand In for Love," "Stand Tall," "Let It All Out," "I'll Be Sweeter Tomorrow," "Look Over Your Shoulder," "Deeper in Love with You," and "One Night Affair." However, while they issued dozens of singles throughout the decade, they never hit the U.S. top 40 (although "Lipstick Traces" made it to number 19 in Canada). On the R&B chart, the O'Jays were somewhat more prominent, but their only top 10 R&B single prior to 1972 was 1968's "I'll Be Sweeter Tomorrow."

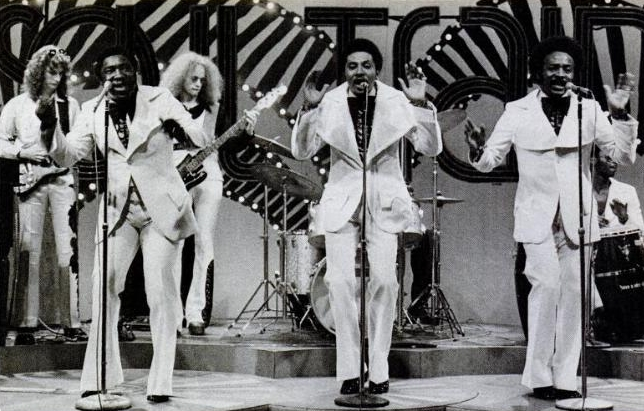
The O'Jays on Soul Train, 1974

In spite of their success as a touring group and on the R&B chart, the group had been considering quitting the music industry in 1972. Around that time, original members Bill Isles and Bobby Massey departed, leaving the group a trio. The remaining three original members, Eddie Levert, William Powell, and Walter Williams, continued recording together, and Gamble & Huff, a team of producers and songwriters with whom the O'Jays had been working for several years, signed them to their Philadelphia International label. Suddenly, the O'Jays released their first million-seller, "Back Stabbers," from the album of the same name. This album produced several more hit singles, including "992 Arguments," "Sunshine," "Time to Get Down," and the number 1 pop smash, "Love Train."

During the remainder of the 1970s, the O'Jays continued releasing hit singles, including "Put Your Hands Together" (Pop number 10), "For the Love of Money" (Pop number 9), "Give the People What They Want," "Let Me Make Love to You," "I Love Music" (Pop number 5), "Livin' for the Weekend," "Message in Our Music," and "Darlin' Darlin' Baby (Sweet Tender Love)." Original member William Powell died of cancer in 1977 at age 35.

After adding Sammy Strain (of Little Anthony and the Imperials), the O'Jays continued recording, though with limited success. In 1978, the group released "Use ta Be My Girl," which was their final top-five hit, though they continued placing songs on the R&B charts throughout the 1980s. The O'Jays also saw some success in the United Kingdom, where they scored nine singles on the UK Singles Chart between 1972 and 1983, including four of which became major hits, reaching the top 20 on that chart. Their 1987 album, Let Me Touch You, included the number one R&B hit "Lovin' You." The O'Jays never again achieved pop success. In 1992, Sammy Strain left the group and returned to the Imperials. Later in the 1990s, the group did little recording.

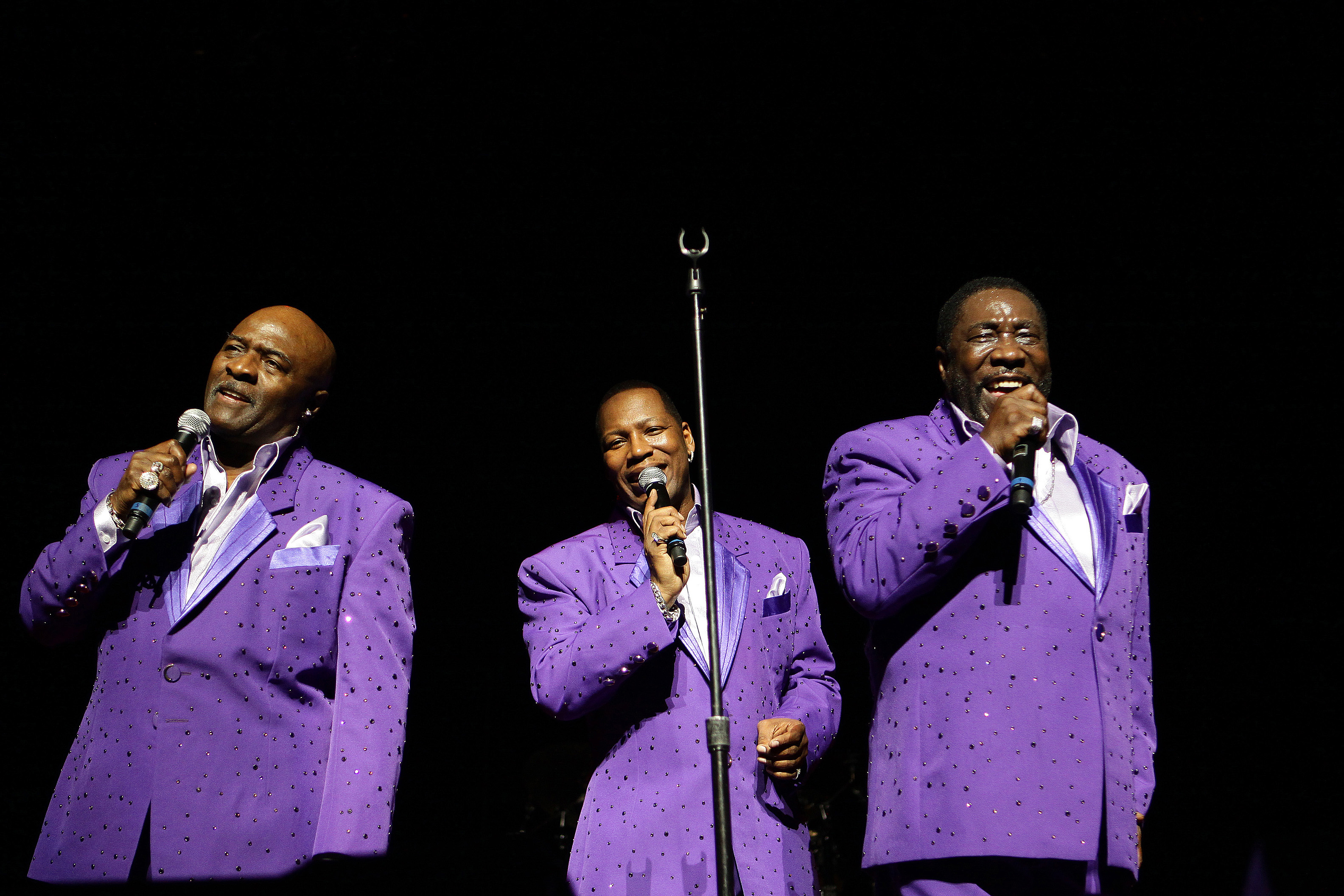
The O'Jays (Walter Williams, Eric Grant, and Eddie Levert) perform at the Arie Crown Theater in Chicago, April 2010.

On October 30, 2010, the group performed at Jon Stewart and Stephen Colbert's Rally to Restore Sanity and/or Fear in Washington, D.C. In Cleveland, Ohio, on August 17, 2013, the O'Jays were inducted into the National Rhythm & Blues Hall of Fame. The O'Jays are also two-time Grammy Hall of Fame Inductees for their songs "Love Train" (inducted 2006) and "For the Love of Money" (inducted 2016).

Bill Isles (born William Carvan Isles II in McAdenville, North Carolina) died on March 25, 2019, in Oceanside, California, at the age of 78.

== Original members ==
- Eddie Levert (born Edward Willis Levert, June 16, 1942, Bessemer, Alabama)
- Walter Lee Williams (born August 25, 1943, Canton, Ohio)
- William Powell (born January 20, 1942, Canton, Ohio; died May 26, 1977, Canton, Ohio)
- Bobby Massey (born March 9, 1942, Detroit, Michigan)
- Bill Isles (born January 4, 1941, McAdenville, North Carolina died March 25, 2019, Oceanside, California)

== Frank Little, Jr. ==
Frank Little, Jr.
- Born: August 1943; Cleveland, Ohio
- Disappeared: 1979 (aged 35–36); Cleveland, Ohio
- Status: Identified in December 2021 (Found on February 18, 1982)
- Died: c. 1979
- Cause of death: Homicide
- Other name: Frank "Frankie" Little
- Occupations: guitarist, songwriter
- Years active: early 1960s–late 1970s
- Children: 2

Frank "Frankie" Little Jr. (born August 1943 – disappeared c. 1979) was a guitarist and songwriter also known by the nickname Brother Rabbit.

Little was born in August 1943 to Frankie Little Sr. and La Verda Stone, who both worked as entertainers. His mother died when Frank was young, and he was raised by his father, aunt and sister. Little had many half-siblings but had one fully related brother, Johnny.

In the early 1960s, he joined the O'Jays. He worked with lead vocalist Eddie Levert, assisting with some of the writing for the group, including 1964's "Do the Jerk" (recorded by Frank Polk), 1964's "Oh, How You Hurt Me" and 1966's "Pretty Words". He is also credited with vocals on 1962's "Down at the Corner." According to Walter Williams, "Frankie was a guitarist and songwriter in the very early O’Jays. He came with us when we first ventured out of Cleveland and traveled to Los Angeles, but he also was in love with a woman in Cleveland that he missed so much that he soon returned back to Cleveland after a short amount of time."

Little married his wife, Precious P. Henderson, in California on June 16, 1965, and had a daughter. Little soon fell homesick and moved back to Cleveland in 1967, but on the day of his arrival, was drafted to Vietnam, and was unable to attend his recently deceased fathers funeral. After returning from Vietnam two years later, he and his brother opened stores right next to each other.

He had two children, a daughter who was born in the mid-1960s and died in 2012, a son born in 1974.

Little was last seen in the late 1970s in Cleveland, according to his son who claims he "vanished" from their East Cleveland apartment when he was five years old, and Frank Little was around thirty-six years old. At the time of his disappearance, he was living with a girlfriend. On February 18, 1982, a bag containing human remains was found by a sixteen-year-old boy buried under snow and dumped behind his mother's roofing-material factory in Twinsburg, Ohio. The boy claimed he was in the back of the building, when he saw a car pull up and dump the bag containing Little's remains. In December 2021, the remains were identified as those of Frankie Little. His death was ruled a homicide, but as of 2021 the persons responsible for his death are unknown.

== Discography ==
=== Top twenty albums ===
The following albums reached the top twenty on the United States Billboard 200 pop albums chart.

- 1972: Back Stabbers (US number 10)
- 1973: Ship Ahoy (US number 11)
- 1974: The O'Jays Live in London (US number 17)
- 1975: Survival (US number 11)
- 1975: Family Reunion (US number 7)
- 1976: Message in the Music (US number 20)
- 1978: So Full of Love (US number 6)
- 1979: Identify Yourself (US number 16)

=== Top twenty singles ===
The following singles reached the top twenty on either the United States Billboard Hot 100 or the United Kingdom's UK Singles Chart.

- 1972: "Back Stabbers" (US number 3; UK number 14; Canada number 39)
- 1973: "Love Train" (US number 1; UK number 9; Canada number 15)
- 1973: "Put Your Hands Together" (US number 10)
- 1974: "For the Love of Money" (US number 9)
- 1975: "I Love Music" (US number 5; UK number 13)
- 1976: "Livin' For The Weekend" (US number 20)
- 1978: "Use ta Be My Girl" (US number 4; UK number 12)

=== DVDs ===
- The O'Jays Live in Concert (2010)

== Gold and platinum records ==
Gold certifications indicating sales exceeding one million copies were awarded by the RIAA for the group's singles "Back Stabbers", "Love Train", "For the Love of Money", "I Love Music", and "Use ta Be My Girl". Additionally, gold certifications for sales exceeding 500,000 copies of the albums Back Stabbers, The O'Jays Live in London, Survival, Message in the Music, Travelin' at the Speed of Thought, and Emotionally Yours were also awarded. Platinum certifications signifying sales exceeding one million copies were awarded to Ship Ahoy, Family Reunion, So Full of Love, and Identify Yourself.

== Other awards ==
- Rock and Roll Hall of Fame (inducted 2005)
- National Rhythm & Blues Hall of Fame (inducted 2013)
- Vocal Group Hall of Fame (inducted 2004)
- Grammy Hall of Fame (two-time inductees) for songs "Love Train" (inducted 2006) and "For The Love Of Money" (inducted 2016)
- Numerous RIAA Gold and Platinum Awards (see above)
- National Rhythm & Blues Foundation Pioneer Award (awarded 1998)
- BET Awards Lifetime Achievement Award (awarded 2009)

== See also ==
- List of number-one hits (United States)
- List of artists who reached number one on the Hot 100 (U.S.)
- List of number-one dance hits (United States)
- List of artists who reached number one on the U.S. Dance chart
