= Gamble and Huff =

American songwriting and record production team

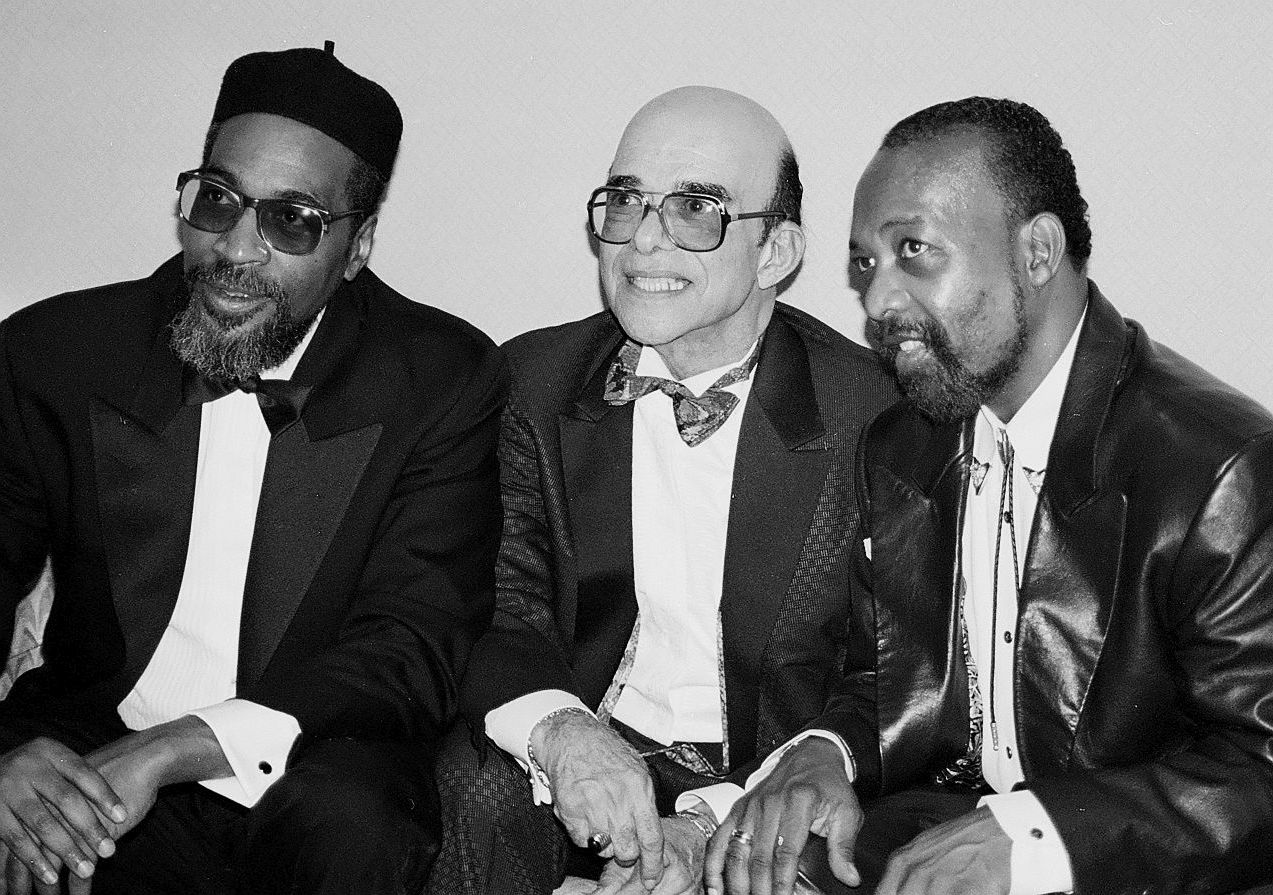
Gamble (left) and Huff (right), 1995

Kenneth Gamble (born August 11, 1943, Philadelphia, Pennsylvania) and Leon A. Huff (born April 8, 1942, Camden, New Jersey) are an American songwriting and production duo credited for developing the Philadelphia soul music genre (also known as Philly sound) of the 1970s. In addition to forming their own label, Philadelphia International Records, Gamble and Huff have written and produced 175 gold and platinum records, earning them an induction into the Rock and Roll Hall of Fame in the non-performer category in March 2008.

== History ==
=== Early years ===
Gamble's childhood in Philadelphia shaped his adult life: he recorded himself on various arcade recording machines, assisted the morning show DJs on WDAS, operated a record store, and sang with The Romeos. In 1964, before there was "Gamble & Huff" there was "Gamble & Ross". Gamble was discovered and managed by Jerry Ross when Gamble was only 17 years old and they collaborated for many years. Gamble teamed up with Leon Huff (keyboards) for the first time on a recording for Candy & The Kisses. Ross then signed Gamble to Columbia Records in 1963 as a solo recording artist, releasing "You Don't Know What You Got Until You Lose It". Gamble & Ross & Huff collaborated on the hit song "I'm Gonna Make You Love Me", originally recorded by Jay & The Techniques, who were a Jerry Ross group, and later covered by Dee Dee Warwick and later by Diana Ross & The Supremes and The Temptations.

In 1967 they produced their first Top 5 hit: "Expressway to Your Heart" by The Soul Survivors. In the spring of 1968, for their own Gamble Records label, they wrote and produced the top 10 hit "Cowboys to Girls" for the Philadelphia group the Intruders. They subsequently worked with Atlantic Records artists Archie Bell & the Drells, Wilson Pickett, Dusty Springfield, and The Sweet Inspirations, as well as with Mercury artists Jerry Butler and Dee Dee Warwick, scoring numerous hits along the way.

=== Philadelphia International ===
With a solid track record now behind them, Gamble and Huff formed Philadelphia International Records in 1971 as a rival to Berry Gordy and Motown. They originally approached Atlantic Records, which passed on the deal as being too expensive. CBS Records, headed at the time by Clive Davis, backed the venture and distributed Philadelphia International's records. Aided and abetted by in-house arrangers Thom Bell, Bobby Martin, and Norman Harris, Philadelphia International released a number of the most popular soul music hits of the 1970s, including "If You Don't Know Me by Now" by Harold Melvin & the Blue Notes, "Back Stabbers", "For the Love of Money", and "Love Train" by The O'Jays, as well as the Grammy-winning "Me and Mrs. Jones" by Billy Paul. According to an interview on BBC Radio 4 on June 28, 2006, Gamble and Huff were inspired to write "Me and Mrs. Jones" after seeing someone they knew who appeared to be involved in an affair, meeting a woman in a cafe frequented by the songwriters. In collaboration with Bell, Gamble and Huff also formed the music publisher Mighty Three Music.

Gamble and Huff's Philadelphia soul sound evolved from the simpler arrangements of the late-1960s into a style featuring lush strings, thumping basslines, and sliding hi-hat rhythms—elements that soon became the distinguishing characteristics of a new style of music called disco. By 1975, Philadelphia International and the Philadelphia soul genre it helped define had largely eclipsed Motown and the Motown Sound in popularity, and Gamble and Huff were the premier producers of soul.

Nearly all of the Philadelphia International records featured the work of the label's in-house band of studio musicians, MFSB (Mother Father Sister Brother). MFSB cut a number of successful instrumental albums and singles written and produced by the Gamble & Huff team and arranged by Bobby Martin including the 1974 number-one hit "TSOP (The Sound of Philadelphia)", now best known as the theme song from the American television show Soul Train.

=== Political activism ===
Throughout the 1970s, Gamble and Huff made music that addressed political and social issues faced by the African American community. Many of their songs articulated the theme of black pride and highlighted the Black Power Movement's struggle for power and self-determination. Representative examples include Billy Paul's "Am I Black Enough for You?" (1972), the O'Jays' "Give the People What They Want" (1975), and the star-studded "Let's Clean Up the Ghetto" (1977), the latter of which was the title track from an album that characterized Philadelphia International's broader political and social designs. Scholar James B. Stewart wrote of the album and initiative: "The record company's ability to mount this type of community empowerment venture, while functioning essentially as a component of CBS's black music department, is an interesting contrast to the more traditional style of corporate control of lyrical content ... The title song ... implores listeners to participate in a physical clean up effort 'because the ghetto is our home.' The titles of several of the other songs on the album convey the album's broader thrust including, 'Now Is the Time to Do It,' 'Year of Decision,' 'New Day, New World Comin',' and 'Save the Children.'" The album cover prominently displayed Gamble's message: "The only way we can clean up the physical ghetto is to first clean up the mental ghetto. With the help of almighty God, we will be able to turn this community into a positive system. Our first step is cleanliness, 'cause it's the closest thing to godliness." The album jacket also noted that all profits from the LP would be donated to charity for five years.

Gamble's "Clean Up The Ghetto" project, which involves the youth of blighted communities to help clean-up and repair damaged or neglected properties, started in Philadelphia, and has spread to Los Angeles, Atlanta, and Chicago with similar events being held throughout the country. Gamble has also contributed his time and energy to the T. J. Martell Foundation and The AMC Cancer Research Center and Hospital. He has served on the board of directors for the Philadelphia Music Foundation, which honors the artists, songwriters, and producers from Philadelphia. He founded the organization Universal Companies which has opened a restaurant, a bookstore, a mosque, low-income housing, and several charter schools. These buildings, mostly built by locally hired labor, have served as springboards to revitalizing neighborhoods. For example, in 2003 Gamble and Universal Companies partnered with others for a $100 million plan to construct and renovate 400 homes in south Philadelphia.

=== Later years ===
In 1975, Philadelphia International became involved in a payola-related scandal; Gamble was fined but Huff was not. By the late 1970s, however, the popularity of the Philadelphia soul sound began to decline. Disco had suffered a backlash, R&B was going back toward the ballad, and rock had returned to the American charts. Still, the label had its share of late 1970s success. Among the later hits were "Enjoy Yourself" by The Jacksons in 1976, and "Ain't No Stoppin' Us Now" by McFadden & Whitehead in 1979. One song they wrote, called "My Mood" was adopted in 1980 as the close of WRC's Friday Night 6pm newscasts. As of 2018, WRC was still using this music.

In 1982, Philadelphia International's biggest star, former Blue Notes singer Teddy Pendergrass, became paralyzed from the waist down in a car accident, and the future of the label came to be in doubt. That year, Philadelphia broke its ties with CBS and made a new deal with EMI. Although the hits had by now dried up, Gamble and Huff continued to write and produce for the label's artists.

1990 finally saw Gamble and Huff recognized with a Grammy Award for Best R&B Song, awarded for Simply Red's cover of the Blue Notes' 1972 hit "If You Don't Know Me By Now". Also in 1990, Mighty Three Music was acquired by Warner Chappell Music. In 1999, Gamble and Huff were honored with the Grammy Trustees Award, joining musical luminaries like Frank Sinatra, The Beatles, and Walt Disney. Their career output of over 3,000 songs places them among the most prolific professional songwriters of all time.

Today, Kenneth Gamble continues to write, often with Leon Huff, and Philadelphia International continues. He still lives in South Philadelphia, and remains active in his community. Gamble owns the shuttered Royal Theater and surrounding properties.

On September 19, 2005, Gamble and Huff were inducted into the Dance Music Hall of Fame for their outstanding achievements as producers at a ceremony held in New York City.

In 2008, Gamble and Huff were the first recipients of the newly created "Ahmet Ertegün Award" by the Rock and Roll Hall of Fame. The award replaces the former "non-performer" inductee category. On May 20, 2009, Gamble & Huff were named BMI Icons at the 57th annual BMI Pop Awards. Together, the duo has collected an astounding 86 BMI Pop and R&B Awards.

In May 2010, Kenneth Gamble and Leon Huff were each awarded an Honorary Doctorate of Music from Berklee College of Music. The ceremony was held at Boston University's Agganis Arena, where the songwriting duo gave the commencement address.

On March 16, 2012, the Philadelphia Inquirer published an obituary for Ruby Gamble, the 96-year-old mother of Gamble, in which he attributes his success to her influence.

"Our mother was extremely special," Kenny Gamble said. "She was the kindest person in our lives. More importantly, she was the inspiration for everything I have done in life, including creating the wonderful music that others have enjoyed around the world." "As the matriarch of the family, she was a spiritual person who devoted her life as one of Jehovah's Witnesses. Her kindness and peacefulness will never be forgotten."

In April 2014, Gamble & Huff was presented a tribute by TV One on their award show "The Trumpet Awards" which was the 22nd Annual Awards ceremony. Joe, Carl Thomas, Lyfe Jennings, SWV, and Billy Paul performed songs for the tribute. SWV performed "If Only You Knew"; with their lead singer Coko singing lead on the song. The song is one of Gamble & Huff's biggest hits produced.

In 2021, Gamble & Huff wrote the song "All in the Family Blues" for Tito Jackson's second album Under Your Spell.

In 2024, Gamble & Huff were awarded Doctor of Music degrees honoris causa by the University of Pennsylvania.

== Discography ==
=== Studio albums produced ===
Year	Album	Artist
1967	The Intruders Are Together	The Intruders
1968	Cowboys To Girls	The Intruders
1968	The Ice Man Cometh (non-PIR album)	Jerry Butler
1970	A Brand New Me (non-PIR album)	Dusty Springfield
1970	When We Get Married	The Intruders
1970	Wilson Pickett In Philadelphia (non-PIR album)	Wilson Pickett
1970	Now I'm a Woman (non-PIR album)	Nancy Wilson
1971	Gonna Take a Miracle (non-PIR album)	Laura Nyro and Labelle
1972	I Miss You	Harold Melvin & the Blue Notes
1972	Drowning in the Sea of Love (non-PIR album)	Joe Simon
1972	Back Stabbers	The O'Jays
1972	360 Degrees Of Billy Paul	Billy Paul
1973	Ship Ahoy	The O'Jays
1973	Love Is The Message	MFSB
1973	The Sound Of Philadelphia '73	Various Artists
1973	Black & Blue	Harold Melvin & the Blue Notes
1975	Dance Your Troubles Away	Archie Bell & the Drells
1975	Wake Up Everybody	Harold Melvin & the Blue Notes
1975	To Be True	Harold Melvin & the Blue Notes
1975	Universal Love	MFSB
1975	Philadelphia Freedom	MFSB
1975	Survival	The O'Jays
1975	Family Reunion	The O'Jays
1976	We Got the Rhythm	People's Choice
1976	Message in the Music	The O'Jays
1976	All Things in Time	Lou Rawls
1976	Jean Carn	Jean Carn
1976	The Jacksons	The Jacksons
1977	Goin' Places	The Jacksons
1977	Travelin' at the Speed of Thought	The O'Jays
1977	Teddy Pendergrass	Teddy Pendergrass
1977	Unmistakably Lou	Lou Rawls
1977	When You Hear Lou, You've Heard It All	Lou Rawls
1978	So Full of Love	The O'Jays
1978	Past, Present and The Futures	The Futures
1978	Life Is a Song Worth Singing	Teddy Pendergrass
1979	Identify Yourself	The O'Jays
1979	Teddy	Teddy Pendergrass
1979	Let Me Be Good to You	Lou Rawls
1979	Live! Coast to Coast	Teddy Pendergrass
1980	The Year 2000	The O'Jays
1980	TP	Teddy Pendergrass
1980	Sit Down and Talk to Me	Lou Rawls
1981	Get as Much Love as You Can	The Jones Girls
1981	The Spirit's in It	Patti LaBelle
1983	I'm in Love Again	Patti LaBelle
1984	Keep It Comin'	The Jones Girls

=== Singles produced ===
Title	Artist
"Expressway to Your Heart"	The Soul Survivors
"Cowboys to Girls"	The Intruders
"I Can't Stop Dancing"	Archie Bell & the Drells
"Only the Strong Survive"	Jerry Butler
"I'm Gonna Make You Love Me"	Dee Dee Warwick (later covered by Diana Ross & the Supremes and The Temptations)
"One Night Affair"	Jerry Butler
"(We'll Be) United"	The Intruders
"A Brand New Me"	Dusty Springfield
"Don't Let the Green Grass Fool You"	Wilson Pickett
"Silly, Silly Fool"	Dusty Springfield
"Slow Motion"	Johnny Williams
"Me and Mrs. Jones"	Billy Paul
"Regina"	Bunny Sigler
"The Bells"	Laura Nyro and Labelle
"Drowning in the Sea of Love"	Joe Simon
"If You Don't Know Me by Now"	Harold Melvin & the Blue Notes / Simply Red
"992 Arguments"	The O'Jays
"You're the Reason Why"	The Ebonys
"I Miss You"	Harold Melvin & the Blue Notes
"When the World's at Peace"	The O'Jays
"That's How Long I'll Be Loving You"	Bunny Sigler
"Back Stabbers"	The O'Jays
"Love Train"	The O'Jays (later covered by Bunny Sigler)
"The Love I Lost"	Harold Melvin & the Blue Notes
"Now That We Found Love"	The O'Jays
"Yesterday I Had the Blues"	Harold Melvin & the Blue Notes
"I'll Always Love My Mama"	The Intruders
"For the Love of Money"	The O'Jays
"Bad Luck"	Harold Melvin & the Blue Notes
"Don't Call Me Brother"	The O'Jays
"Zach's Fanfare (I Hear Music)"	MFSB
"Love Is the Message"	MFSB
"Am I Black Enough for You"	Billy Paul
"Sunshine"	The O'Jays
"When Will I See You Again"	The Three Degrees
"Livin' For the Weekend"	The O'Jays
"Wake Up Everybody"	Harold Melvin & the Blue Notes
"Enjoy Yourself"	The Jacksons
"I Could Dance All Night"	Archie Bell & the Drells
"I Love Music"	The O'Jays
"Love Epidemic"	The Trammps
"Stairway to Heaven"	The O'Jays
"Show You the Way to Go"	The Jacksons
"Do It Any Way You Wanna"	People's Choice
"My One and Only Love"	MFSB
"Rich Get Richer"	The O'Jays
"Hope That We Can Be Together Soon"	Harold Melvin & the Blue Notes
"Ooh Child"	Dee Dee Sharp
