= Philadelphia International Records =

- Parent company: Sony Music Entertainment
- Founded: 1971 (55 years ago)
- Founder: Kenneth Gamble, Leon Huff
- Defunct: 2001 (25 years ago)
- Distributor: Legacy Recordings (re-issues)
- Genre: Philadelphia soul; R&B
- Country of origin: United States
- Location: Philadelphia, Pennsylvania

Philadelphia International Records (PIR) was an American record label based in Philadelphia, Pennsylvania. It was founded in 1971 by songwriting and production duo Kenneth Gamble and Leon Huff along with their longtime collaborator Thom Bell. It was known for showcasing the Philadelphia soul music genre (also known as Philly soul) that was founded on the gospel, doo-wop and soul music of the time. This sound later marked a prominent and distinct era within the R&B genre. During the 1970s, the label released a string of worldwide hits that emphasized lavish orchestral instrumentation, heavy bass and driving percussion.

Some of their most popular and best selling acts included the O'Jays, Harold Melvin & the Blue Notes, Teddy Pendergrass, MFSB, Billy Paul, Patti LaBelle and Lou Rawls. Between 1971 and the early 1980s, the label released more than 170 gold and platinum records.

Philadelphia International Records had been mostly defunct since 1987 and finally shut down in 2001. As of 2026, Sony Music Entertainment owns all rights to the Philadelphia International Records catalogue, which completely secured in 2014.

== Beginning and success ==
Kenneth Gamble and Leon Huff, the founders of Philadelphia International Records, met in 1964 while they were both playing as session musicians for various labels, including Philadelphia based Cameo-Parkway Records, whose building would later become home to Philadelphia International Records' recording studio. In 1965, Huff joined Gamble's band, the Romeos, a popular moniker at the time, by replacing future Philadelphia International Records producer and arranger Thom Bell on piano. Gamble and the Romeos had seen little success playing for their label, Arctic Records, and split up soon after.

When the Romeos disbanded, Gamble and Huff went on to start one of the first iterations of Philadelphia International Records (which they named Excel and Gamble) after a visit to Motown Records in Detroit to scope out the Motown setup. The success of their biggest signing, the Intruders, brought attention to Gamble and Huff, which allowed them to create Neptune Records in 1969. Neptune Records, a more ambitious project for the duo, was financed by Chess Records, and allowed them to sign later Philadelphia International Records artists the O'Jays and the Three Degrees. When Chess Records changed ownership in 1969, Neptune Records folded. With the collapse of Neptune Records, Gamble and Huff transferred their signed artists to a new project, Philadelphia International Records. Looking to attract new black acts to their label, but without the in-house knowhow, Columbia Records was convinced to sign an exclusive production contract with Gamble and Huff's new Philadelphia International Records.

The label was set up in connection with Mighty Three/Assorted Music, the music publishing company run by Gamble, Huff and another Philadelphia producer, Thom Bell, to showcase their songs.

The label's major hits included: "TSOP (The Sound of Philadelphia)" by MFSB, featuring the Three Degrees, 1974 (which was later used as one of the theme tunes for the TV dance-music show Soul Train); "Ain't No Stoppin' Us Now" by McFadden & Whitehead (writers and producers with the label), 1979; "Back Stabbers" and "Love Train" by the O'Jays, 1972/3; "If You Don't Know Me By Now" and "The Love I Lost" by Harold Melvin & the Blue Notes, 1972/3; "Me and Mrs. Jones" by Billy Paul, 1972; "When Will I See You Again" by the Three Degrees, 1974; and "You'll Never Find Another Love Like Mine" by Lou Rawls, 1976.

The label had a distribution deal with CBS Records until 1984. Distribution of the catalog from 1976 onward was taken over by EMI Records, but CBS continued to distribute material recorded up to 1976. In 2007, Sony's Legacy Recordings regained the rights to Philadelphia International's full catalog and the following year, PIR/Legacy released a box set titled Love Train: The Sound of Philadelphia.

Most of the music released by the label was recorded and produced at Sigma Sound Studios in Philadelphia, with chief engineer and later studio owner Joe Tarsia recording many of the sessions. More than 30 resident studio musicians, known collectively as MFSB ("Mother Father Sister Brother"), were based at this studio and backed up most of the recordings. Some of these musicians also acted as arrangers, writers or producers for Philadelphia International as well as for other labels recording in the city. They included Bobby Martin, Norman Harris, Thom Bell, Ronnie Baker, Vince Montana and, later, Jack Faith and John Usry.

Gamble and Huff worked as independent producers with a series of artists in the late 1960s and early 1970s, including Jerry Butler, Wilson Pickett and Dusty Springfield. They also produced the Jacksons' first two albums for Epic/CBS after the group had left Motown in 1976. The first, titled The Jacksons, featured the platinum-selling single "Enjoy Yourself," and a second album, Goin' Places, followed in 1977. Although on CBS subsidiary Epic, both albums and the singles also carried a Philadelphia International logo.

In 1965, Gamble and Huff started an independent label, Excel Records. It was soon renamed Gamble Records and in 1972, was folded into Philadelphia International as a subsidiary. In 1974, the subsidiary's name was changed to TSOP Records, taken from the title of the 1974 hit single "TSOP (The Sound of Philadelphia." Artists for Excel/Gamble/TSOP included Dee Dee Sharp, Archie Bell & the Drells and the People's Choice, who had a top 10 single on TSOP in 1976 with "Do It Any Way You Wanna." Later signings to the Philly International roster in the 1980s and 1990s included Patti Labelle, the Stylistics, Phyllis Hyman and the Dells.

Between 1973 and 1975, Gamble and Huff also distributed a boutique label called Golden Fleece, set up by musicians Norman Harris, Ronnie Baker and Earl Young, which released the second album by the Trammps. Gamble and Huff also launched a short-lived subsidiary called Thunder Records. Created by Thom Bell, it only had two singles: Derek & Cyndi's "You Bring Out the Best in Me/I'll Do the Impossible for You," which was produced by Bell, and Fatback Band member Michael Walker's "I Got the Notion, You Got the Motion," produced by his brother and Spinners member Philippe Wynne.

== Later period ==
By the mid-1980s, Philadelphia International Records had ended the distribution deal that they had with Columbia. The label was soon after picked up by Capitol/EMI Records. They continued to make hits, including Shirley Jones' "Do You Get Enough Love," but their most successful years were behind them.

In the 1990s, Philadelphia International launched a new subsidiary, Uncensored Records. Featuring Damon and No Question, the label releases hip hop music. Philadelphia International now largely concentrates on licensing its music catalog worldwide and has issued few new recordings since the mid-1980s when Gamble and Huff wound down their studio work together.

In 1989, Gamble and Huff were awarded their first Grammy Award. Simply Red's cover of "If You Don't Know Me By Now," written by Gamble and Huff, won the Grammy Award for Best R&B Song. In 1999, Gamble and Huff were awarded the Lifetime Achievement Grammy from the National Academy of Recording Arts and Sciences. In 2008, the duo was inducted in the Rock and Roll Hall of Fame in the non-performer category, joining their band the O'Jays, who were inducted in 2005.

In November 2009, PBS aired a two-part special, Love Train: The Sound of Philadelphia, that focuses on Gamble and Huff and the family of Philadelphia International Records artists. The concert was shot before a live audience on June 7, 2008, at the Borgata Hotel and Casino in Atlantic City, and showcased TSOP artists.

In February 2010, fire swept through parts of the offices on Philadelphia's Broad Street. The building was previously the home of another iconic part of the city's musical heritage, Cameo-Parkway Records, based there during the 1950s and 1960s, and has become a tourist attraction. The fire was started deliberately by a man who had broken into the offices while so intoxicated by alcohol that he had no later recollection of the crime.

In August 2011, in honor of the 40th anniversary of the company, Philadelphia International Records launched TSOP Soul Radio, an online radio station that airs music and interviews from the Gamble and Huff catalog.

The building that housed Philadelphia International Records located on Broad and Spruce Streets was damaged by arson in 2010 and was effectively shut down. It was sold to local developer Dranoff Properties in 2014. On April 18, 2015, demolition started on the building. Dranoff Properties announced plans to build an SLS International Hotel at the site of the building.

Gamble and Huff have written more than 3,000 songs during their careers. They continue to write songs together from their homes in South Philadelphia.

== Philly soul ==
Philadelphia soul, or Philly soul, is a form of soul music that emanated from Philadelphia during the mid-1960s. It provided a smoother alternative to the deep soul of the 1960s while maintaining the soul and emotion of popular R&B of the time. Philadelphia International Records was one of the most successful labels to capitalize on this new genre with acts such as the O'Jays and Teddy Pendergrass.

Philly soul is known for its incorporation of lush string arrangements along with penetrating brass, and often tells very personal and emotional stories. The world-renowned Philadelphia Orchestra's string section was often employed to play on many of Philadelphia International Records' tracks. Philly soul is often considered a producer's genre, the essence of the genre coming mostly from Gamble, Huff, Bell, and the other producers within PIR. Philly soul, with its driving rhythms, later became an inspiration for the disco craze of the 1970s.

== Discography ==
Catalog numbers from 1971 to 1985 are part of CBS Records' overall numbering system, and therefore are discontinuous. Albums released from 1986 to 1990 were part of Capitol/EMI catalog numbering system. Catalog numbers for albums released after 1991 are from Philadelphia International's distribution deal with Zoo Entertainment.

Catalog	Album	Artist	Year
KZ 30580	Going East	Billy Paul	1971
KZ 31648	I Miss You	Harold Melvin & Blue Notes	1972
KZ 31712	Back Stabbers	O'Jays	1972
KZ 31793	360 Degrees of Billy Paul	Billy Paul	1972
KZ 31794	Dick Jensen	Dick Jensen	1973
ZX 31991	Save the Children	Intruders	1973
KZ 32046	MFSB	MFSB	1973
KZ 32118	Ebony Woman	Billy Paul	1973
KZ 32119	Feelin' Good at the Cadillac Club	Billy Paul	1973
KZ 32120	The O'Jays in Philadelphia (originally released in 1970 on Neptune Records)	O'Jays	1973
KZ 32131	Super Hits	Intruders	1973
KZ 32404	Spiritual Concept	Spiritual Concept	1973
KZ 32406	The Three Degrees	Three Degrees	1973
KZ/ZQ 32407	Black And Blue	Harold Melvin & Blue Notes	1973
KZ/PZ/PZQ 32408	Ship Ahoy	O'Jays	1973
KZ 32409	War Of The Gods	Billy Paul	1973
KZ 32419	The Ebonys	Ebonys	1973
KZ/ZQ 32707	Love is the Message	MFSB	1973
KZ 32713	The Sound Of Philadelphia '73	Various Artists	1973
KZ 32859	That's How I'll Be Loving You	Bunny Sigler	1974
KZ 32952	Live in Europe	Billy Paul	1974
KZ/PZQ 32953	The O'Jays Live In London	O'Jays	1974
KZ/PZ 33148	To Be True	Harold Melvin & Blue Notes	1975
KZ 33150	Survival	O'Jays	1975
KZ 33152	Potpourri	Thad Jones & Mel Lewis	1975
KZ 33153	Reality	Monk Montgomery	1974
KZ 33154	Boogie Down U.S.A.	People's Choice	1975
PZ 33157	Got My Head on Straight	Billy Paul	1975
PZ 33158	Universal Love	MFSB	1975
KZ 33162	International	Three Degrees	1975
KZ 33249	Keep Smilin'	Bunny Sigler	1975
PZ/PZQ 33807	Family Reunion	O'Jays	1975
PZ/PZQ 33808	Wake Up Everybody	Harold Melvin & Blue Notes	1975
PZ 33839	Happy 'Bout The Whole Thing	Dee Dee Sharp	1976
PZ 33840	The Three Degrees Live	Three Degrees	1975
PZ 33841	Could It Be Magic	Anthony White	1976
PZ 33843	When Love Is New	Billy Paul	1975
PZ/PZQ 33845	Philadelphia Freedom	MFSB	1975
PZ 33957	All Things in Time	Lou Rawls	1976
PZ 33958	Travelin' In Heavy Traffic	Don Covay	1976
PZ 34079	Life On Mars	Dexter Wansel	1976
PZ 34122	From North Philly (Live)	Dap 'Sugar' Willie	1976
PZ 34123	Unemployment Blues	Force Of Nature	1976
JE/PE 34229	The Jacksons	Jacksons	1976
PZ 34232	Collectors' Item: All Their Greatest Hits!	Harold Melvin & Blue Notes	1976
PZ 34238	Summertime	MFSB	1976
PZ 34245	Message in the Music	O'Jays	1976
PZ 34267	My Music	Bunny Sigler	1976
PZ 34323	Where Will You Go When The Party's Over	Archie Bell & the Drells	1976
PZ 34346	Bicentennial Poet	Jean-Claude T.	1976
PZ 34358	Get Down With The Philly Jump	Instant Funk	1976
PZ 34389	Let 'Em In	Billy Paul	1976
JZ34390	Teddy Pendergrass	Teddy Pendergrass	1977
PZ 34394	Jean Carn	Jean Carn	1977
PZ 34437	What Color Is Love	Dee Dee Sharp	1977
PZ 34487	What the World Is Coming To	Dexter Wansel	1977
PZ 34488	Unmistakably Lou	Lou Rawls	1977
PZ 34658	End Of Phase I	MFSB	1977
PZ 34659	Let's Clean Up The Ghetto	Various Artists	1977
PZ 34684	Travelin' at the Speed of Thought	O'Jays	1977
ZX 34728	Disco Champs	Trammps	1977
JE/PE 34835	Goin' Places	Jacksons	1977
PZ 34855	Hard Not To Like It	Archie Bell & the Drells	1977
PZ 34923	Only The Strong Survive	Billy Paul	1977
PZ 34940	Philadelphia Classics	Various Artists	1977
PZ 34985	Voyager	Dexter Wansel	1978
PZ 34986	Happy To Be With You	Jean Carn	1978
PGZ 35024/Z 2-35024	The O'Jays: Collectors' Items	O'Jays	1977
JZ35036	When You Hear Lou, You've Heard It All	Lou Rawls	1977
JZ35095	Life Is a Song Worth Singing	Teddy Pendergrass	1978
JZ/PZ 35355	So Full of Love	O'Jays	1978
JZ35363	Turn Me Loose	People's Choice	1978
JZ35458	Past, Present And The Futures	Futures	1978
JZ35509	Rush Hour	Bobby Rush	1978
JZ35510	Nothing Says I Love You Like I Love You	Jerry Butler	1978
JZ35516	MFSB: The Gamble & Huff Orchestra	MFSB	1978
PZ 2-35517	Live	Lou Rawls	1978
JZ35756	First Class	Billy Paul	1979
JZ35757	The Jones Girls	Jones Girls	1979
JZ35758	Edwin Birdsong	Edwin Birdsong	1979
JZ35800	McFadden & Whitehead	McFadden & Whitehead	1979
FZ36003	Teddy	Teddy Pendergrass	1979
JZ/PZ 36006	Let Me Be Good to You	Lou Rawls	1979
JZ36007	Michael Pedicin Jr.	Michael Pedicin Jr.	1979
JZ36024	Time Is Slipping Away	Dexter Wansel	1979
FZ36027	Identify Yourself	O'Jays	1979
JZ36036	Frantique	Frantique	1979
JZ36096	Strategy	Archie Bell & the Drells	1979
JZ36097	The Force	Force	1979
JZ36196	When I Find You Love	Jean Carn	1979
JZ36294	Live! Coast to Coast	Teddy Pendergrass	1979
JZ/PZ 36304	Sit Down and Talk to Me	Lou Rawls	1979
JZ36313	The Harris Machine	Norman Harris	1980
Z 2-36314	Best of Billy Paul	Billy Paul	1980
JZ36370	Dee Dee	Dee Dee Sharp	1980
JZ36413	The Best Love	Jerry Butler	1980
JZ36414	Greetings Of Peace	Futures	1981
JZ36745	TP	Teddy Pendergrass	1980
JZ36758	Here to Create Music	Leon Huff	1980
JZ36767	At Peace with Woman	Jones Girls	1980
JZ36774	Shades of Blue	Lou Rawls	1980
FZ/PZ 37380	The Spirit's in It	Patti Labelle	1981
FZ37491	It's Time for Love	Teddy Pendergrass	1981
FZ37627	Get as Much Love as You Can	Jones Girls	1981
FZ37683	Live On Stage	Various Artists	1982
FZ37684	Best of Philadelphia International	Various Artists	1982
FZ37955	1982	The Stylistics	1982
FZ37999	My Favorite Person	O'Jays	1982
FZ38118	This One's For You	Teddy Pendergrass	1982
FZ/PZ 38518	When Will I See You Again	O'Jays	1983
FZ38539	I'm in Love Again	Patti Labelle	1983
FZ38555	Keep It Comin'	Jones Girls	1984
FZ38646	Heaven Only Knows	Teddy Pendergrass	1983
FZ39251	Greatest Hits	O'Jays	1984
FZ39252	Greatest Hits	Teddy Pendergrass	1984
PZ 39254	Philadelphia International Dance Classics, Vol. I	Various Artists	1984
PZ 39255	Philly Ballads, Volume I	Various Artists	1984
FZ39285	Classics	Lou Rawls	1984
FZ39367	Love And More	O'Jays	1984
FZ40020	Patti	Patti Labelle	1985
ST-53015	Love Fever	The O'Jays	1985
ST-53028	The Whitehead Brothers	Kenny & Johnny	1986
ST-53029	Living All Alone	Phyllis Hyman	1986
ST-53031	Always in the Mood	Shirley Jones	1986
ST-53036	Let Me Touch You	O'Jays	1987
11006-1	Prime of My Life	Phyllis Hyman	1991
11008-1	Universe	Universe	1991
11023-1	I Salute You	The Dells	1992
11040-1	I Refuse to Be Lonely	Phyllis Hyman	1995
30902	Forever with You	Phyllis Hyman	1998

== See also ==
- List of record labels
