= Philadelphia soul =

Musical genre

- Other names: Philly soul; The Philadelphia sound; Phillysound; TSOP
- Stylistic origins: Soul; funk; rhythm and blues; big band; baroque pop; Philly music
- Cultural origins: Late 1960s, Philadelphia, Pennsylvania, United States
- Derivative forms: Disco; smooth jazz

Regional scenes
- Philadelphia

Philadelphia soul, sometimes called Philly soul, the Philadelphia sound, Phillysound, or The Sound of Philadelphia (TSOP), is a genre of late 1960s–1970s soul music characterized by funk influences and lush string and horn arrangements. The genre laid the groundwork for the emergence of disco later in the 1970s by fusing the R&B rhythm sections of the 1960s with the pop vocal tradition, and featuring a more pronounced jazz influence in its melodic structures and arrangements. Fred Wesley, trombonist with the J.B.'s and Parliament-Funkadelic, described the Philadelphia soul sound as "putting the bow tie on funk."

== Style ==
Due to the emphasis on sound and arrangement and the relative anonymity of many of its artists, Philadelphia soul is often considered a producers' genre. Songwriters and producers Bunny Sigler, Kenny Gamble, and Leon Huff are credited with developing the genre.

Other notable Philadelphia soul songwriters and producers included Bobby Martin, Thom Bell, Linda Creed, Norman Harris, Dexter Wansel, and McFadden & Whitehead of Gamble and Huff's Philadelphia International Records, who worked with a stable of studio musicians to develop the unique Philadelphia sound. Many of these musicians would also record as MFSB, which had a hit with the seminal Philadelphia soul song "TSOP (The Sound of Philadelphia)" in 1974. Written and produced by Gamble and Huff, "TSOP" also became the theme song for the musical variety show Soul Train.

Notable session musicians of the Philadelphia sound were bassist Ronald Baker, guitarist Norman Harris and drummer Earl Young (B-H-Y), who also worked as a songwriting and production team and recorded as the Trammps. These three were the base rhythm section for MFSB and created a sub-label of Philadelphia International Records called Golden Fleece, distributed by CBS Records (now Sony Music). Soon after, Harris created the Gold Mind label in conjunction with Salsoul Records. Gold Mind's roster included First Choice, Loleatta Holloway, and Love Committee, all of whom would feature Baker/Harris/Young productions of their material. Their 1976 hit by Double Exposure, "Ten Percent", was the first commercial 12-inch single.

Philadelphia soul was popular throughout the 1970s, and it set the stage for the styles of disco and R&B that would emerge later in the decade. The style also influenced many other Philadelphia acts, such as Hall and Oates, the Roots, Vivian Green, Jill Scott, and Musiq Soulchild. David Bowie's 1975 album Young Americans was partially recorded at Philadelphia's Sigma Sound Studios and influenced by Philadelphia soul.

== See also ==
- Philadelphia International Records
- Sigma Sound Studios
- Rock and Soul (disambiguation)
- Progressive soul
