= Ebony Woman =

Studio album by Billy Paul
- Released: 1970
- Recorded: 1969
- Studio: Sigma Sound, Philadelphia, Pennsylvania
- Genre: Soul, Philadelphia soul
- Length: 36:29
- Label: Neptune
- Producer: Kenny Gamble & Leon Huff

Billy Paul chronology
Feelin' Good at the Cadillac Club (1968)	Ebony Woman (1970)	Going East (1971)

Alternative cover
- Album cover used for 1973 re-release by Philadelphia International Records KZ 32118, featuring model/singer/actress Grace Jones in one of her first professional modelling jobs

Ebony Woman is an album by soul singer Billy Paul. The album was produced by Kenny Gamble and Leon Huff, arranged by Stanley Johnson and Bobby Martin, and engineered by Joe Tarsia. On its original Neptune Records release in 1970 the LP reached number 12 on the Billboard soul charts and number 183 on the pop charts. The song "Let's Fall in Love All Over" was released as a single but failed to chart. The album was re-released with new cover art in 1973 on Philadelphia International Records reaching number 186 on the pop chart and number 43 on the soul charts. Big Break Records remastered the album for its 2012 re-release on CD.

== Release and critical reaction ==
Professional ratings
Review scores
Source	Rating
AllMusic	2/5 stars
Chris Wells	2/5 stars
Pitchfork	6.4/10

Billy Paul originally recorded the song "Ebony Woman" in 1959 and it was released as a single on the New Dawn label. The song was resurrected and re-cut as the title track for an album which Paul and his producers Kenny Gamble and Leon Huff wanted to make a statement with. Specifically, Paul's debut Feelin' Good at the Cadillac Club was a conventional jazz album with sparse production that failed to make the impact they hoped it would. Paul recalled the shift in direction: "We decided to do something with a more up-to-date sound, with more musicians. Something that would venture a bit into R&B but without me losing my sound. We spent a lot of time workin it out and came up with the album called Ebony Woman, which came out on Neptune." Paul mixed jazz and soul; ballads with mid-tempo and upbeat numbers; and covers with originals—a formula he would repeat on subsequent albums. The album's modest chart success was buoyed by its considerable appeal in Detroit, home of Motown.

Ed Williams, Program Director for WLIB in New York City, wrote the liner notes that appear on the back cover of the album:

After nearly four hundred years of toil and strife "EBONY WOMAN" is finally on her way. No longer does she have to wait until nightfall to be queen. She is a great symbol of strength and courage. As she fittingly assumes her proper place in the universe, her honor is shared with both Morris Bailey, the perceptive author of Ebony Woman and Billy Paul, the artist who depicts her so tenderly.

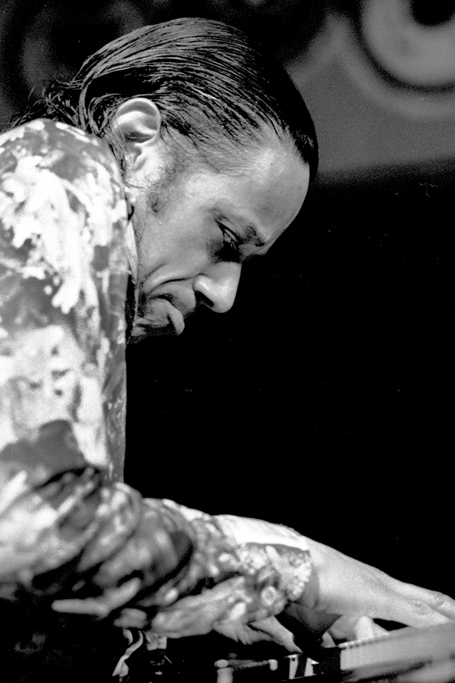
Horace Silver recorded "Psychedelic Sally" as an instrumental but when Billy Paul said that he wanted to record it, Silver gave Paul the lyrics.

Billy Paul knows the blues--he's lived them. For him the blues is as much a part of his heritage as a part of the dues he's had to pay. At 12, he appeared as a regular on the Paul Whiteman Amateur Hour. Turning professional at age 16 he then made appearances with the late great Charlie Parker and Dinah Washington, and Leslie Uggams--to name a few. In the Armed Forces he was with the Army Symphony Orchestra and has also appeared with such greats as Eddie Harris, Cedar Walton, and Leroy Wright.

Billy, as a contemporary and aware personality is naturally concerned with growth and development. He digs the challenge of taking on new material (which include the new fashions seen on the album cover which were furnished by the New Breed Ltd. in N.Y.C.) like "Let's Fall in Love All Over", written by Bobby Martin of Neptune Records. Psychedelic Sally, another tune of particular interest was originally recorded by Horace Silver as an instrumental. Horace Silver, who takes all credit for writing this tune, has given "Psychedelic Sally" to Billy Paul who brings it on with full fashion.

Each experience is part of Billy Paul and so is each song, because he sings about life. His ability to communicate straight from the heart shows how he utilizes every moment of his life and submits each added dimension to his versatile music vocabulary. He sings about heartbreak in "Traces", joy in "Windy" and about life in "Everyday People".

With this album and the aid of a fine manager, Al Richardson (of Strate Ahead Productions Ltd.), Billy Paul and his trio, (consisting of Stanley Johnson, pianist, Sherman Ferguson, percussionist, and James Glenn, Bassist; three very bright and talented musicians) are emerging as a vital force in every aspect of the music world.

Right on Paul! Right on Ebony Woman! There's a world out there and she's yours....

Ed Williams,
Program Director
Radio Station WLIB, N.Y.
In collaboration with:
Frani Schwartz
Earl Shelton
Al Richardson

Author John A. Jackson explained how the album's struggles were necessarily tied to the fortunes, or lack thereof, of Gamble & Huff's independent record label Neptune Records:

"The pop music business was undergoing a period of corporate consolidation, making it more difficult, of not impossible, for an independent record company to survive. Unlike the early 1960s, when independent labels could wheel and deal for airplay, five major record manufacturers (Columbia, Warner-Seven Arts, RCA Victor, Capitol-EMI, and MGM) now controlled more than half of the pop marketplace. Proof of Gamble & Huff's growing impotence within that structure was evinced by their attempt to boost Neptune's anemic album catalog. Although Billy Paul's second album, a jazz-oriented collection of songs with heavier orchestration and a decidedly more soulful sound than exhibited on his first album, managed to penetrate the R&B charts, it was doomed by Neptune's misfortune. By the summer of 1970, the label was history."

Specifically, Neptune was distributed by Chess Records and when owner Leonard Chess died, Neptune was forced to close shop.

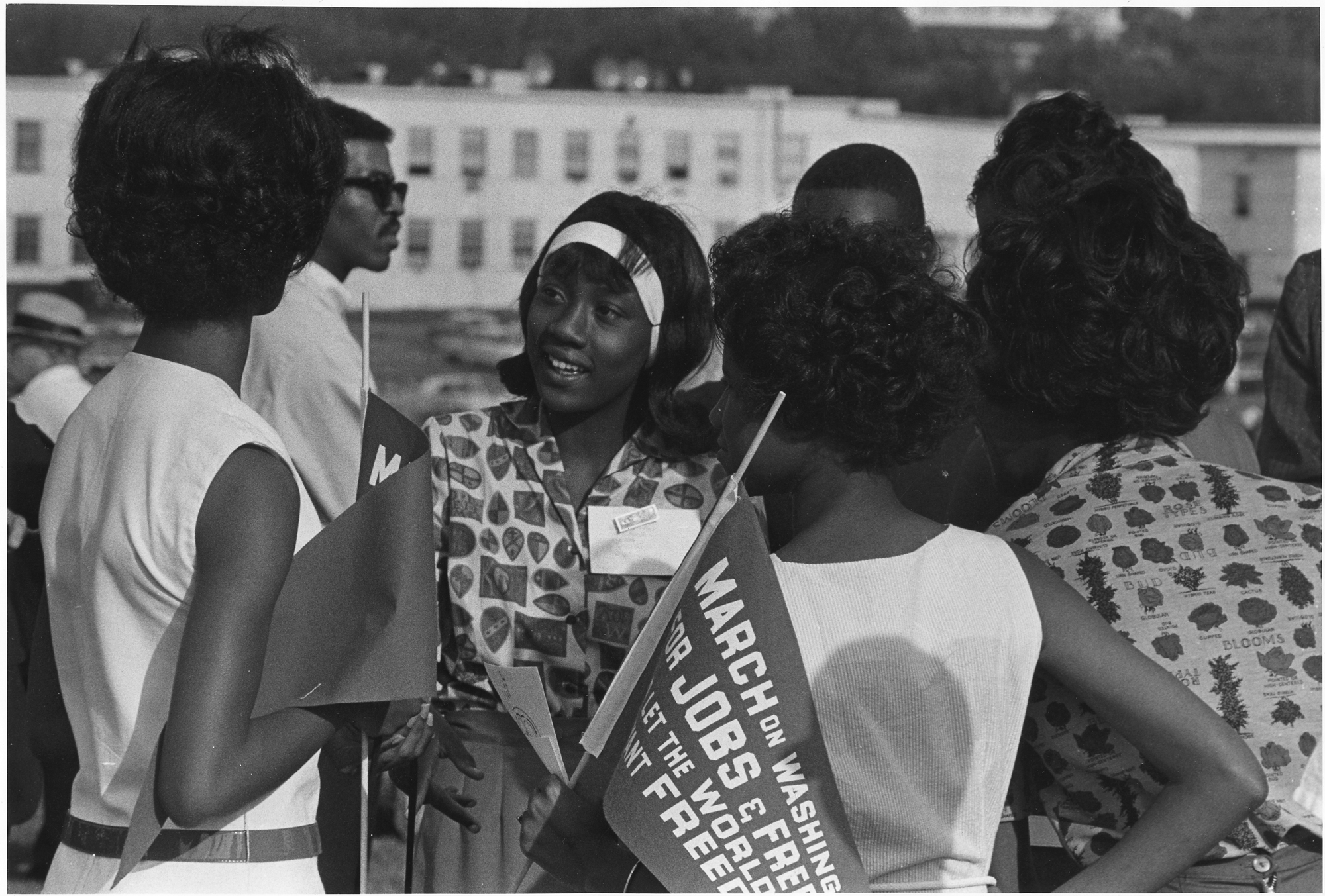
Young women at the Civil Rights March on Washington for Jobs and Freedom, 1963.

But Paul continued to record for Gamble & Huff's new label Philadelphia International Records and following the massive success of "Me and Mrs. Jones" and the 360 Degrees of Billy Paul album, Gamble & Huff decided to reissue Paul's first two albums. When asked in 1973 about a follow-up to 360 Degrees, Paul replied:

"I have honestly been too busy doing shows across the country to get settled into thinking about a new album, it's as simple as that. That's why I think they have just re-leased a couple of my earlier albums again. You remember the old Ebony Woman and Live At The Cadillac Club albums? Well, they have repackaged them and put them out again. People have been asking for my earlier albums since the 360 Degrees album and since they weren't available any longer, the company felt it to be worthwhile to put them out again. Plus, of course, there wasn't a new album to go with! Do I still like those old albums? Well, yes, I do, really, but they don't really hold up against say the 360 Degrees album because I'm into a different thing now, you see. But, musically, I really believe I did some of my best work then — I still think the Ebony Woman album is one of my very best."

AllMusic's Ron Wynn called the album "good, though uneven" giving it two out of five stars.

Chris Wells also gave the album two of five stars noting that the title track for the album is "by far its best track – a gorgeous, superbly sung ballad, a paean to the African-American female in a time of civil rights and social and political consciousness. Unfortunately a lot of the rest isn’t up to much. Basically, it’s covers all the way...Paul investing lots of effort to no great purpose. True, Billy’s own contributions reveal him to be a singer of character and individuality, albeit one in need of some strong material to call his own."

On the album's 2012 reissue, Joe Marchese of The Second Disc called it a "must-have reissue.... an album that's most worthy of reassessment and reissue especially during this, PIR's 40th anniversary year."

== Track listing ==
Side 1

1. "Ebony Woman" (Morris Bailey) – 3:52
2. "Mrs. Robinson" (Paul Simon) – 4:31
3. "Windmills of Your Mind" (Alan and Marilyn Bergman, Michel Legrand) – 8:00
4. "Everyday People" (Sylvester Stuart) – 3:55

Side 2

1. "Let's Fall in Love All Over" (Robert Martin) – 3:51
2. "Windy" (Ruthann Friedman) – 2:50
3. "Psychedelic Sally" (Horace Silver) – 2:58
4. "Traces" (Buddy Buie, J. R. Cobb, Emory Gordy, Jr.) – 4:01
5. "Proud Mary" (John Fogerty) – 2:23

== Personnel ==
- Billy Paul – lead and backing vocals
- Stanley Johnson – piano, arrangements
- Sherman Ferguson – percussion
- James Glenn – bass
- Bobby Martin – arrangements on "Ebony Woman" and "Let's Fall in Love All Over"

Technical

- Joe Tarsia – engineer
- Dick Fowler – album design
- Mastered at Frankford/Wayne Recording Labs
- Ed Lee, Hiroshi Morishima – design (1973 PIR reissue)
- Don Hunstein – photography (1973 PIR reissue)
- Nick Robbins – remastering from 1st generation tapes at Sound Mastering in London for BBR 2012 reissue

== Charts ==
1970 chart performance for Ebony Woman
Chart (1970)	Peak position
Billboard Pop Albums	183
Billboard Top Soul Albums	12

1973 chart performance for Ebony Woman
Chart (1973)	Peak position
Billboard Pop Albums	186
Billboard Top Soul Albums	43
