= Going East =

Studio album by Billy Paul
- Released: 1971
- Recorded: 1971
- Studio: Sigma Sound, Philadelphia, Pennsylvania
- Genre: Soul, Philadelphia soul
- Length: 40:37
- Label: Philadelphia International
- Producer: Kenny Gamble & Leon Huff

Billy Paul chronology
Ebony Woman (1970)	Going East (1971)	360 Degrees of Billy Paul (1972)

Going East is an album by soul singer Billy Paul. The album was arranged by Bobby Martin, Lenny Pakula and Thom Bell.

== Reception ==
Professional ratings
Review scores
Source	Rating
Allmusic	4/5 stars
Pitchfork	8.0/10

Released in 1971, this would be Paul's Philadelphia International Records debut after recording his first two albums for Kenny Gamble and Leon Huff's Neptune and Gamble labels. Gamble recalled:

"We really wanted to get a big hit on Billy. The problem was finding a balance between his natural jazz style and what was going down in soul music. The Ebony Woman album for Neptune had started getting Billy into a commercial groove and got a lot of favorable reaction from the industry. So for Billy's next album, Goin' East, we extended the concept further. We took in outside influences--the Beatles, the Eastern thing--but we kept it rhythmic and we didn't try to smother Billy. We nearly had a hit with "Magic Carpet Ride" from the album."

Paul's 10:21 live version of "East" appears on the 2011 Legacy CD Golden Gate Groove: The Sound of Philadelphia Live in San Francisco 1973 - a record company event recorded on 27 June 1973 at the Fairmont Hotel. Paul and other PIR acts were backed by MFSB which featured 35 musicians including Leon Huff on organ. Paul's performance of "Me and Mrs. Jones" (8:34) from the event also appears on the album.

== Track listing ==
1. "East" - (Tyrone W. Brown) 6:46
2. "(If You Let Me Make Love to You Then) Why Can't I Touch You?" - (Charles Courtney, Peter Link) 2:42
3. "This Is Your Life" - (Jimmy Webb) 4:16
4. "Jesus Boy (You Only Look Like a Man)" - (Moh Jakke) 4:17
5. "Magic Carpet Ride" - (J. Cohn, R. Green, C. Makem) 5:19
6. "I Wish It Were Yesterday" - (Bobby Martin, Lee Phillips) 3:50
7. "Compared to What" - (Gene McDaniels) 5:20
8. "Love Buddies" - (Kenny Gamble, Leon Huff) 3:40
9. "There's a Small Hotel" - (Lorenz Hart, Richard Rodgers) 4:27

== Personnel ==
- Billy Paul - lead and backing vocals
- Norman Harris, Roland Chambers - guitar
- Eddie Green - piano
- Vince Montana - vibraphone
- Tyrone Brown - bass
- Norman Farrington - drums
- Tony Williams - flute, saxophone
- Robert Crippen - congas
- Charles Jules, Gerald Roberts - shekere percussion
- Don Renaldo and his String Section - strings
- Sam Reed and his Horns - horns
- Bobby Martin (tracks: B2 to B5), Lenny Pakula (tracks: A1), Thom Bell (tracks: A2 to B1) - string and horn arrangements

== Charts ==
Chart (1971)	Peak position
Billboard Pop Albums	197
Billboard Top Soul Albums	42 (1972)
