= Live in Europe (Billy Paul album) =

Live album by Billy Paul
- Released: 1974
- Recorded: December 1973
- Genre: Soul, Philadelphia soul
- Length: 30:56
- Label: Philadelphia International
- Producer: Bobby Martin

Billy Paul chronology
| War of the Gods (1973) | Live in Europe (1974) | Got My Head on Straight (1975) |

Professional ratings
Review scores
| Source | Rating |
|---|---|
| AllMusic | 2/5 stars |

Live in Europe is an album by soul singer Billy Paul. The album was produced by Bobby Martin and arranged by Billy Paul and Caldwell McMillan. It was recorded at Hammersmith Odeon, London and Central Hall, Chatham, England in December 1973. Released in 1974, this album reached #10 on the Billboard Soul Album chart and #187 on the Billboard Pop album chart.

== Release and critical reception ==
Following his 1973 European tour, Billy Paul taped an episode of Soul Train on January 20, 1974. Stephen McMillian wrote: "During Billy's interview with Don [Cornelius], he mentioned that he had returned from a European tour with the O'Jays and The Intruders, stating that the response was great and very receptive. 'The most amazing thing is to see people who can’t understand your language but they enjoy your music and the sound,' Billy told Don. Several of the songs he performed on the London leg of the European tour were released on his wonderful live album entitled Billy Paul Live in Europe."

On its release in 1974, Billboard noted in its June 22 issue: "The five songs on the album average eight minutes in length, but the time is taken up by extended singing, concentrating on separate parts of the material, rather than a lot of empty rapping. The excitement at Paul's London debut is palpable. Best cut: 'Brown Baby.' Dealers: Can display in tandem with new O'Jay live LP cut at same hall."

AllMusic's Ron Wynn wrote: "Paul was not a great live vocalist either as a jazz or soul singer, something that was evident on this mid-'70s set. No matter how polished or well-rehearsed the backing band, Paul's flaws couldn't be covered as smoothly in a concert setting, and they're revealed along with his strengths -- timing, a good delivery, and decent range and interpretative skills."

== Track listing ==
All tracks composed by Kenny Gamble and Leon Huff; except where indicated

Side 1

1. "War of the Gods Introduction-Brown Baby" – 9:11
2. "Thanks for Saving My Life" – 4:19

Side 2

1. "Me and Mrs. Jones" (Kenny Gamble, Leon Huff, Cary Gilbert) – 8:48
2. "Your Song" (Bernie Taupin, Elton John) – 8:41

Note: digital versions of the album divide the LP's first track: "War of the Gods Introduction" (2:00) and "Brown Baby" (7:09); the live version of "Me and Mrs. Jones" appears in a slightly longer form (9:04) as a bonus track on digital versions of the studio album 360 Degrees of Billy Paul (1972).

== Personnel ==
- Arranged By – Billy Paul, Caldwell McMillan
- Art Direction – Ed Lee
- Engineer – Bob Hall
- Engineer, Remix – Jay Mark
- Liner Notes – John E. Abbey
- Photography By – Urve Kuusik
- Producer – Bobby Martin
- Mobile Recording facilities provided by The Rolling Stones and The Manor
- Remixed At – Sigma Sound Studios
- Mastered At – Frankford/Wayne Recording Labs

== Charts ==
| Chart (1974) | Peak position |
|---|---|
| Billboard Pop Albums | 187 |
| Billboard Top Soul Albums | 10 |
