= Feelin' Good at the Cadillac Club =

Studio album by Billy Paul
- Released: 1968
- Recorded: 1968
- Studio: Virtue Recording Studios, Philadelphia, Pennsylvania
- Genre: Soul, Philadelphia soul
- Label: Gamble Records
- Producer: Billy Paul

Billy Paul chronology
Feelin' Good at the Cadillac Club (1968)	Ebony Woman (1970)

Alternative cover
- Album cover used for 1973 re-release by Philadelphia International Records KZ 32119.

Feelin' Good at the Cadillac Club is the debut album by soul singer Billy Paul. The album was produced by Billy Paul and released by Kenny Gamble and Leon Huff's Gamble Records in 1968. The Toots Thielemans song "Bluesette" was released as a single but failed to chart as did the album. The LP was re-released with new cover art in 1973 on Philadelphia International Records but again failed to chart. Big Break Records remastered the album for re-release on CD in 2014 with new liner notes and an interview with Billy Paul.

== Release and critical reaction ==
Professional ratings
Review scores
Source	Rating
Allmusic	3/5 stars

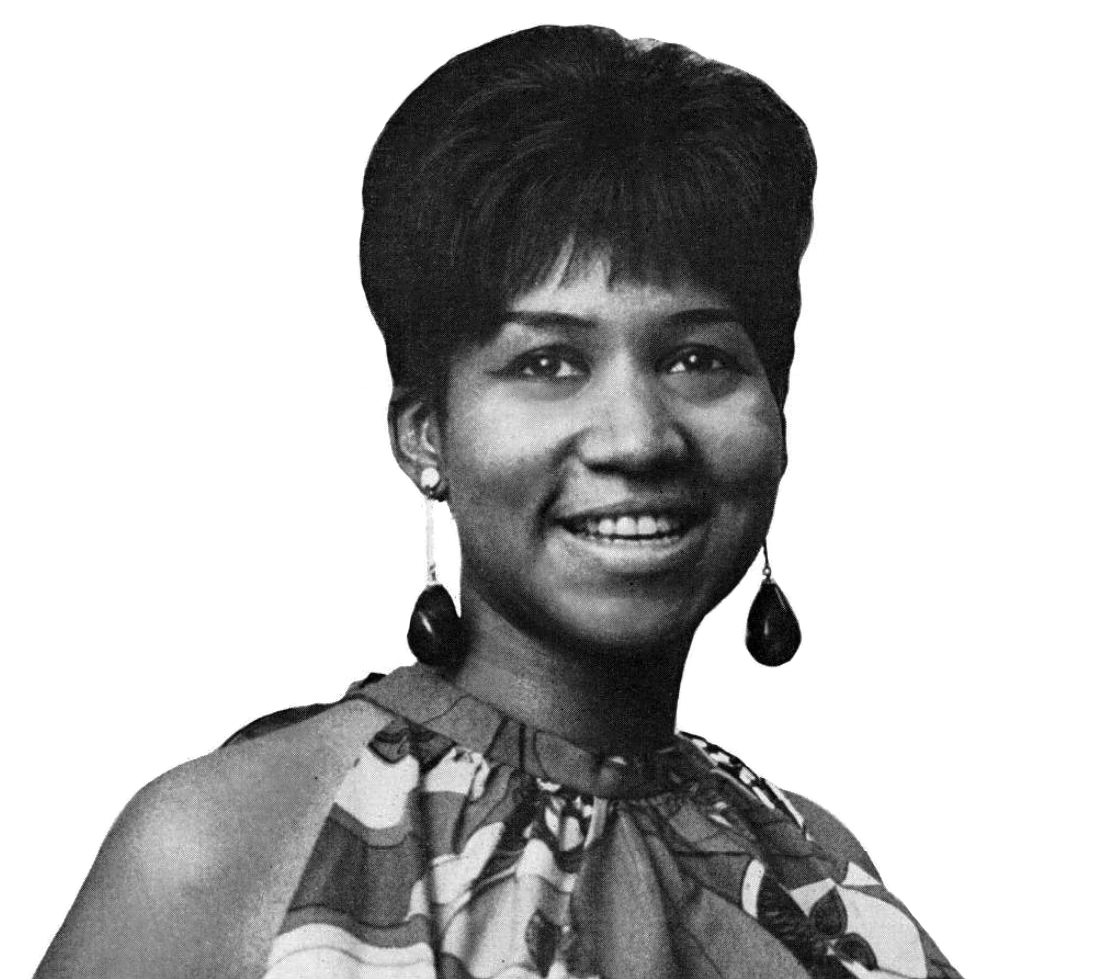
Aretha Franklin was one of the many entertainers who played at Benjamin and Ruth Bynum's Cadillac Club in North Philadelphia. Billy Paul's debut album is named after the venue.

Despite its title, the album is not a live recording but a studio creation based on Paul's live act, which he regularly performed at Philadelphia's Cadillac and other clubs. Paul recalled: "[The Cadillac] was a famous, famous club. Aretha Franklin worked there. Me and George Benson used to work there all the time." Located at 3738 Germantown Ave. in North Philadelphia, the Cadillac opened in 1965 and was run by Benjamin and Ruth Bynum before becoming the Impulse Discothèque in 1977. Benjamin booked the entertainers, Ruth handled the finances, and their two young sons Robert and Benjamin Jr. worked at the club. Benjamin Jr., who with his brother followed in their parents' footsteps and ran their own jazz club Zanzibar Blue from 1990-2007 and collaborated with Gamble & Huff on The Sound of Philadelphia (TSOP) nightclub and restaurant, recalled how as a young boy he met entertainers like Gladys Knight & the Pips who regularly visited the family's house when they were in town to play at the Cadillac: "Most times I was in bed. Mostly I look at pictures and remember stories about how my mother pierced Aretha Franklin's ears for the evening. But I don't honestly even remember how old I was when that happened."

Paul had been somewhat of a child prodigy singing in jazz clubs and cutting a handful of singles in the 1950s. Toward the end of the 1960s, Paul and his wife and manager Blanche Williams had invested $365 of their own money toward recording a Billy Paul album. One night in 1967 at Philadelphia's Sahara club on 15th and South Streets, Kenny Gamble caught Paul's show. Gamble recalled: "I got talking to Billy about coming to Gamble Records. Billy had gone and recorded a few things on himself and he wanted three more sides to make an album. So we went in the studios and cut three things and we put them on the album Feelin' Good at the Cadillac Club. Paul recalled their meeting: "I was singing in a jazz club called the Sahara. He had a record shop on South St & Philly - right round the corner and I was singing with a trio at the Sahara club on Friday, Saturday and Sunday. He came over and said 'I am starting a record company and I would like to sign you.' Low [sic] and behold I took all the material I sung every weekend and I did an album in three and a half hours – a whole album. I had this album, and I produced it – me and my wife. And we gave him this album called Feelin' Good at the Cadillac Club to help start the record company and that was the album that helped start it up." The finished work was the second album on Gamble & Huff's new label (the first was The Intruders debut LP).

The LP's original liner notes were an early attempt to market Paul as more than simply a one-dimensional jazz vocalist:

"'Soul' is a word that has probably taken more of a beating in the past five years than most of the words in the English language have taken during the past one-hundred years. And still, no one has come up with a generally accepted definition of the term. Billy Paul says, 'Soul is just being me,' and I think that's the one definition I can accept without reservation.

In trying to analyze the electrifying style of Billy Paul, the closest one can come to breaking it down is to say that the style is simply him - emotional, urgent, compelling and the sound of the times with a definite intertexture of the gospel mode.

From the very beginning, Billy was always fascinated by the phrasings and seemingly limitless range of horns. It makes a lot of sense, because one of the first things that strikes a listener hearing him for the first time is the horn-like quality of his voice, particularly in the way he phrases the lyric. This is undoubtedly why musician Cecil Payne said that Billy Paul sounds 'just like a flute.'

From the frenetic pace of Toots Thielemans' jazz standard, "Bluesette," to the haunting approach of "Somewhere," Billy Paul runs the gamut of versatility. "Feeling Good," a big production number, is notable for the dominating figure created by the piano, drums and bass which makes for an almost hymnal effect.

"Just in Time," which starts off with Billy accompanied only by bassist Bill Collick, gives the whole group an opportunity to have a ball, as do "That's Life," "Billy Boy," "Don't Think Twice," and "Missing You."
But easily, the top number on this album has got to be "On a Clear Day." Arranged by pianist Stanley Johnson (as are all the numbers) "Clear Day" has been given an unusual Latin background, and so startling is the effect that one cannot help wondering why it was never done before.

All in all, an auspicious introduction to a new and exciting talent, Billy Paul - a young man who will probably be making fine albums, like this one, forever.

Joe Hunter
WHAT-FM RADIO

Philadelphia, Penna.

In its February 10, 1968 issue, Billboard listed the album as one of its "New Action LP's". Yet neither the album, nor its single "Bluesette" / "Somewhere" (Gamble G-232), drew much attention. Author John A. Jackson suggested that the problem was less with the music than with the inherent difficulty independent labels faced in promoting their artists: "Gamble and Huff fared no better marketing Billy Paul's light jazz vocals than they did with their underachieving soul artists. His debut album went virtually unnoticed."

As they did with Ebony Woman Gamble & Huff decided to reissue this album after the success of "Me and Mrs. Jones" and the 360 Degrees of Billy Paul album. The LP's new liner notes were written by music journalist Jean-Charles Costa:

With his brilliant hit single, "Me and Mrs. Jones," soaring across the national airwaves, Billy Paul is finally getting the kind of national acceptance that he so rightfully deserves. Fellow artists like Nancy Wilson have been aware of Billy's talents for quite a while, and it's to everybody's benefit that his smash single and best-selling album, 360 Degrees of Billy Paul, have thrust his vocal gifts into the national spotlight. His perfectly defined and totally supple singing style, a unique amalgam of jazz, pop, and R&B influences, embodies a potential that transcends even his biggest hits.
Unlike other artists, records are only part of the Billy Paul story. His warm and intense personal appearances are highlighted by an improvisational brilliance that matches his innovative sense of phrasing. Feelin' Good at the Cadillac Club is an exciting studio-"live club date" recording combination, produced by Billy Paul, that conveys the total energy flow that he generates every time he steps out onto a stage. When you sing contemporary material with the kind of honesty and commitment that Billy Paul does, you have to be able to carry it off "live." This breakthrough LP typifies his ability to do just that...and more.

Allmusic's Ron Wynn gave the album three out of five stars and said: "Paul might have been successful in jazz; if he emerged in the '80s or '90s doing this kind of supper-club/cabaret fare, he would immediately be routed into the adult contemporary and Quiet Storm market and probably be a huge hit.

On the album's 2014 reissue, Joe Marchese of The Second Disc noted: "Though it’s far from a typical 'soul' album, one listen reveals just how much soul always resided within Billy Paul."

== Track listing ==
Side 1

1. "Billy Boy" - (Traditional) 2:43
2. "Missing You" - (Kenny Gamble) 2:45
3. "Bluesette" - (Norman Gimbel, Jean Thielmans) 3:05
4. "On a Clear Day (You Can See Forever)" - (Alan Jay Lerner, Burton Lane) 4:39
5. "Just in Time" - (Betty Comden, Adolph Green, Jule Styne) 3:56

Side 2

1. "That's Life" - (Dean Kay, Kelly Gordon) 4:05
2. "Don't Think Twice, It's All Right" - (Bob Dylan) 2:03
3. "Feeling Good" - (Leslie Bricusse, Anthony Newley) 8:30
4. "Somewhere" - (Leonard Bernstein, Stephen Sondheim) 3:37

== Personnel ==
- Billy Paul - vocals, producer
- Stanley Johnson - piano, arrangements
- Norman Fearrington - drums
- Bill Collick - bass

Technical

- Nick Robbins - remastering from 1st generation tapes at Sound Mastering, London for BBR 2012 reissue
