= When Love Is New =

When Love is New

Studio album by Billy Paul
- Released: November 1975
- Recorded: 1975
- Studio: Sigma Sound, Philadelphia, Pennsylvania
- Genre: Soul, Philadelphia soul
- Length: 37:33
- Label: Philadelphia International
- Producer: Kenny Gamble & Leon Huff

Billy Paul chronology
Got My Head on Straight (1975)	When Love is New (1975)	Let 'Em In (1976)

Professional ratings
Review scores
Source	Rating
Allmusic	3/5 stars

When Love is New is an album by soul singer Billy Paul. It was produced by Kenny Gamble & Leon Huff; arranged by Bobby Martin, Dexter Wansel, Norman Harris, and Jack Faith; and engineered by Joe Tarsia. Released in December 1975, it reached #139 on the Billboard Pop Album chart and #17 on the Soul chart. It includes the singles "Let's Make a Baby" which hit #83 on the Pop singles chart, #18 on the Soul chart, and #30 in the UK and "People Power" which reached #82 on the Soul chart and #14 on the U.S. Dance chart. The album was reissued on CD in 2010 by the U.K.'s Edsel Records. This was the final album where Paul was backed by MFSB, the house band of Philadelphia International Records (PIR).

== Release and critical reaction ==
Both the album's front and back cover show Paul laying down in a relaxed, happy pose -- evocative of the LP's title about new love.

The album was released in November 1975. Its first single, "Let's Make a Baby" performed well, breaking into the Hot 100 Pop charts and Soul top-twenty. It was also a top-40 hit in the U.K. "People Power" was Paul's second single from the album and his first and only Dance hit.

In his 3 January 1976 column for Billboard, Tom Moulton noted: "Without a doubt, the music of Philadelphia is the strongest influence on the disco market these days. A quick glimpse : The O'Jays with their recent No. 1 disco audience response record in "I Love Music" (PIR); the Mighty Clouds of Joy's current No. 1 disco record "MIGHTY HIGH" (ABC); Harold Melvin & the Blue Notes, the Salsoul Orchestra and Archie Bell & the Drells all with songs on the disco listing; and Billy Paul and Dee Dee Sharp both with records fast gaining acceptance at the club level. Indications are, too, that the city's musical influence is going to continue well through 1976.

Stephen McMillian called the album "fantastic" and recounted Paul's Soul Train appearance on 4 April 1976 to promote it:

He opened with the album’s title tune, an outstanding classic romantic ballad. As he performed, the entire set was dark to set the right proper mood and atmosphere with the exception of a spotlight on Billy, who wore a white suit and black hat. It’s an underrated track and is one of the best love songs ever recorded.

Later during the interview, Don [Cornelius] asked Billy if he was gratified over the success of the When Love Is New album. Billy replied that he was, due to the fact that he had a chance to write some songs for the album, including “Let the Dollar Circulate.” Don asked who wrote the controversial tune on the album “Let’s Make A Baby,” to which Billy answered Kenny Gamble and Leon Huff. The mere title of that song brought laughter among Billy, Don and the Soul Train Gang due to its suggestive title. He spoke of the concerts he had done recently with MFSB (Mother Father Sister Brother), chiefly his concert in New York’s Carnegie Hall which was very successful.

Billy then performed the uptempo, thumping “People Power,” a great song about solidarity among the human race. Billy closed with the aforementioned “Let’s Make A Baby.” Unlike what most people think of the song’s title, the song is a gentle, beautiful ballad about a married couple coming together to “be fruitful and multiply” and make children and raise them with wisdom and knowledge. Some critics at the time thought the song was promoting fornication and out-of-wedlock children, but that wasn’t the case at all. It was simply a beautiful and tender tune about procreation.

Allmusic's Andrew Hamilton reviewed the title track: "One of Kenny Gamble and Leon Huff's classiest numbers, it speaks of the joys of love in its embryonic stage -- when it's new. A standard in waiting, it reminds of '50s and '60s MOR songs done by Tony Bennett, Vic Damone, Nat King Cole, and others. Bennett detested most pop/rock songs, dismissing them as junk, but would have enjoyed wrapping his golden vocal chords around this warmer. Billy Paul gives a good account on the 1975 release with a deliberate articulation of the thoughtful, heartfelt lyrics.

Hamilton said of "Malorie": "sounds like a song suited for the big-band singers of the '40s and '50s. The light airy swinger features Paul displaying his jazz pipes -- scatting, jiving, exhorting -- as he raves about some damsel, accompanied by timely female vocals."

On the 2010 Edsel CD reissue, Joe Marchese of The Second Disc said: "While not featuring any hits the magnitude of his majestic 'Me and Mrs. Jones,' the goods are still delivered by writer/producers Gamble and Huff and arrangers including Dexter Wansel."

== Track listing ==
All tracks composed by Kenny Gamble & Leon Huff; except where indicated

Side 1

1. "People Power" - (Gene McFadden, John Whitehead, Victor Carstarphen) - 4:18
2. "America (We Need the Light)" - (Billy Paul, Donald Level, Kenny Gamble) - 5:20
3. "Let the Dollar Circulate" - (Billy Paul, Donald Level) - 4:58
4. "Malorie" - (Edward Osborne) - 3:46

Side 2

1. "When Love is New" - 5:28
2. "I Want 'Cha Baby" - 6:18
3. "Let's Make a Baby" - 7:11

== Personnel ==
- Billy Paul - lead and backing vocals, producer on "Let the Dollar Circulate"
- Dexter Wansel - keyboards, synthesizers, arranger on "People Power"
- Norman Harris - guitar, arranger on "I Want 'Cha Baby"
- Bobby Eli, Bunny Sigler, David Bay, Roland Chambers - guitar
- Eddie Green, Leon Huff - piano
- Vincent Montana, Jr. - vibraphone
- Anthony Jackson, Ron Baker - bass
- Earl Young, Norman Farrington - drums
- Don Renaldo - horns, strings
- Larry Washington - congas
- Lenny Pakula - organ
- Carla Benson, Evette Benton, Barbara Ingram - backing vocals
- Bobby Martin - arranger on "America (We Need the Light)", "Let the Dollar Circulate", "When Love is New" and "Let's Make a Baby"
- Jack Faith - arranger on "Malorie"

Technical

- Joe Tarsia - engineer
- Jim Gallagher, Mike Hutchinson - assistant engineers
- Carl Barile, Ed Lee - design
- Don Hunstein - photography

== Charts ==
Albums

Chart (1976)	Peak position
Billboard Pop Albums	139
Billboard Top Soul Albums	17

Singles

Year	Single	Chart positions			
Year	Single	U.S. Billboard Hot 100	US Soul	US Dance	UK
1976	"Let's Make a Baby"	83	18	—	30
1976	"People Power"	—	82	14	—

== See also ==
- List of number-one R&B albums of 1976 (U.S.)
