= Am I Black Enough for You? =

Am I Black Enough for You? may refer to:

- Am I Black Enough for You? (album), an album by Schoolly D
- "Am I Black Enough for You?" (song), a 1972 song by Billy Paul
