= Got My Head on Straight =

Album by Billy Paul

Studio album by Billy Paul
- Released: 1975
- Recorded: 1974
- Studio: Sigma Sound, Philadelphia, Pennsylvania
- Genre: Soul, Philadelphia soul
- Length: 44:34
- Label: Philadelphia International
- Producer: Kenny Gamble & Leon Huff

Billy Paul chronology
Live in Europe (1974)	Got My Head on Straight (1975)	When Love is New (1975)

Professional ratings
Review scores
Source	Rating
Allmusic	3/5 stars

Got My Head on Straight is an album by soul singer Billy Paul. It was produced by Kenny Gamble & Leon Huff, arranged by Bobby Martin and Lenny Pakula, and engineered by Joe Tarsia. Released in 1975, it reached #140 on the Billboard Pop Album chart and #20 on the Soul chart. It includes the singles "Be Truthful to Me" #37 R&B; "Billy's Back Home" #52 R&B; and "July, July, July, July" which did not chart.

== Recording, release and critical reaction ==
As was customary with most PIR acts, MFSB completed the backing tracks for the album prior to Paul overdubbing the vocals in fall 1974.

Prior to the album's release, the single "Be Truthful to Me" was issued in late 1974. While the single did crack the top forty on the soul charts, it failed to cross over to the pop charts.

The album was well received on its release in early 1975. In its February 8, 1975 issue, Billboard noted: "After a lull in activity, Paul has come up with one of his most together efforts to date. The singing is trademarked and the orchestrations and material fit in nicely. His voice is totally enchanting and many of these cuts should break out. Some of them will get disco play. Best cuts: 'Black Wonders Of The World,' 'Billy's Back Home,' 'When It's Your Time To Go,' 'Be Truthful To Me,' Everything Must Change.' Dealers: In-store play will sell records and the packaging is beautiful."

Allmusic's Andrew Hamilton said of "Black Wonders of the World": "Above a moody but robust track that features a strident synthesizer, African drums, and Hammond organ chords, a geeked Billy Paul turns professor and lectures about the many black (people) wonders of the world, including Martin Luther King, Mahalia Jackson, Eli Whitney, Jimi Hendrix, Jackie Robinson, John Coltrane, and Billie Holiday."

Despite the enthusiasm, neither the album nor any of the singles were able to reach a broad audience. Author John A. Jackson noted that the results were "disappointing" to Paul and everyone involved due to the LP's failure to "regenerate the brief crossover success he experienced two years earlier."

== Track listing ==
All tracks composed by Kenny Gamble & Leon Huff; except where indicated

Side one

1. "July, July, July, July" - 5:30
2. "Billy's Back Home" - (Dexter Wansel) - 4:33
3. "I've Got So Much to Live For" - 4:51
4. "Black Wonders of the World" - (Kenny Gamble, Leon Huff, Billy Paul, John Whitehead, Gene McFadden) - 8:02

Side two

1. "Enlightenment" - 4:53
2. "When It's Your Time to Go" - 5:02
3. "Be Truthful to Me" - (Kenny Gamble, Leon Huff, John Whitehead, Gene McFadden) - 3:08
4. "Everything Must Change" - (Bernard Ighner) - 5:23
5. "My Head's on Straight" (Kenny Gamble, Leon Huff, Billy Paul) - 3:12

== Personnel ==
- Billy Paul - lead and backing vocals
- Dexter Wansel - keyboards, synthesizers
- Bobby Eli, Bunny Sigler, David Bay, Norman Harris, Roland Chambers - guitar
- Eddie Green, Leon Huff - piano
- Vincent Montana, Jr. - vibraphone
- Anthony Jackson, Ron Baker - bass
- Earl Young, Norman Farrington - drums
- Don Renaldo - horns, strings
- Larry Washington - congas
- Lenny Pakula - organ
- Carla Benson, Evette Benton, Barbara Ingram - backing vocals

== Charts ==
Albums

Chart (1975)	Peaks
Billboard Pop Albums	140
Billboard Top Soul Albums	20

Singles

Year	Single	Peaks
Year	Single	US Soul
1974	"Be Truthful to Me"	37
1975	"Billy's Back Home"	52
1975	"July, July, July, July"	—
