= Traces (song) =

Single by Classics IV

from the album Traces
- B-side: "Mary, Mary Row Your Boat"
- Released: January 1969
- Recorded: 1968
- Genre: Soft rock; blue-eyed soul; pop
- Length: 2:45
- Label: Imperial
- Songwriters: Buddy Buie, J. R. Cobb, Emory Gordy Jr.
- Producer: Buddy Buie

Classics IV singles chronology
"Stormy" (1968)	"Traces" (1969)	"Everyday With You Girl" (1969)

"Traces" is a 1968 song by the American rock band Classics IV. Released as a single in January 1969, the cut served as the title track off the album of the same name. Written by Buddy Buie, J. R. Cobb, and Emory Gordy Jr., the song peaked at No. 2 on 29 March 1969 on the Hot 100, as well as No. 2 on the Easy Listening music charts, making it the highest-charting single by the Classics IV.

"Traces" was listed at 32 in BMI's Top 100 Songs of the Century.

== Chart history ==
Chart (1969)	Peak position
Canada RPM 100	2
Canada RPM Adult Contemporary	1
U.S. Billboard Hot 100	2
U.S. Billboard Easy Listening	2

== Cover versions ==
- Jane Morgan, on her 1969 LP of the same name, as well as releasing it as a single that same year.
- "Traces" is the opening track on Bert Kaempfert & His Orchestra's album Traces of Love (1969).
- The Lettermen recorded it as a part of a medley, which also featured the song "Memories" (1969); they recorded a standalone version as well.
- Mel Torme (1969), on the album Rains Drops Keep Falling on my Head.
- Andre Kostelanetz recorded an instrumental version on a 1969 album of the same name.
- Hugo Montenegro on his 1969 album Moog Power.
- Soul singer Billy Paul, on his 1970 album Ebony Woman.
- Liberace (instrumental) on his 1970 album A Brand New Me.
- Harry James on his 1976 album The King James Version (Sheffield Lab LAB 3).
- Gloria Estefan covered the song in 1994.
- Guilherme Arantes recorded "Traces" in 1995.
