= War of the Gods =

War of the Gods may refer to:

- War of the Gods (album), a 1973 album by soul singer Billy Paul
- "War of the Gods" (Battlestar Galactica), a two-part episode of the 1978 television series Battlestar Galactica
- War of the Gods (comics), a 1991 DC Comics crossover/miniseries, written by George Pérez, celebrating the 50th anniversary of Wonder Woman
- Theomachy, divine conflicts in Greek mythology
- "War of the Gods", a song by Amon Amarth, on the album Surtur Rising
- War of the Gods (novel), a fantasy & science-fiction novel by Poul Anderson
