= 360 Degrees of Billy Paul =

Studio album by Billy Paul
- Released: 1972
- Recorded: 1972
- Studios: Sigma Sound, Philadelphia, Pennsylvania
- Genres: Soul, Philadelphia soul
- Length: 44:45 (original LP)
- Label: Philadelphia International
- Producer: Kenny Gamble and Leon Huff

Billy Paul chronology
Going East (1971)	360 Degrees of Billy Paul (1972)	War of the Gods (1973)

Professional ratings
Review scores
Source	Rating
AllMusic	4/5 stars
Creem	B−
Echoes	3/5 stars
Džuboks	(favorable)
Pitchfork	8.5/10

360 Degrees of Billy Paul is an album by soul singer Billy Paul. It was produced by Kenny Gamble and Leon Huff and arranged by Bobby Martin, Lenny Pakula and Norman Harris. Released in 1972, it includes the Grammy Award-winning number 1 pop and soul single "Me and Mrs. Jones" and its follow-up "Am I Black Enough for You?" which reached number 29 on the soul chart and number 79 on the pop chart. The album was expanded and remastered by Big Break Records for compact disc in 2012 with three bonus tracks, new liner notes by Andy Kellman, and new quotes from Billy Paul.

== Release and critical reception ==
The LP's original liner notes were written by Louise Williams from WDAS (AM) Radio: "A star is someone very special, talented, warm, human and personal and an outstanding performer. In the lineup of stars, Billy Paul was rejected because he is super warm, super human, super personal and a super performer; in short, Billy Paul is a super star. If you haven't discovered him yet, you will whenever you listen to this album, especially the selection "Me and Mrs. Jones" – and don't forget I told you so." Kenny Gamble was similarly enthusiastic in discussing how Paul's sound developed over the years from the early club jazz of Feelin' Good at the Cadillac Club (1968) to the merging of jazz and soul on Going East (1971): "and then we did Billy's 360 Degrees album and it all came together with "Me & Mrs. Jones."

During his appearance on Soul Train in October 1972, Paul was asked by host Don Cornelius whether he had a jazz background. Paul used the opportunity to promote his new album and highlight its diverse styles: “That's very correct. I've been singing since I was 11. At 16 I was working with Charlie Parker. He's one of the giants. Coming from a jazz background it was one of the greatest things to happen for any singer because of the fact I took an interest at heart but learned to build on it. When I say that I just didn't want to be labeled as a jazz singer but like my new album, the one that "Me & Mrs. Jones" is on, it's called 360 Degrees of Billy Paul and that means I'm covering all of the territories."

In its November 25, 1972, issue, Billboard wrote: "Billy Paul, already a giant in the jazz field has exploded into an even greater soul and pop star via his single "Me and Mrs. Jones" spotlighted in this delightful package. Other standouts in this Gamble-Huff production are "Brown Baby," "Am I Black Enough for You" and Al Green's "Let's Stay Together" all making this a winner in the pop, soul and jazz markets."

Andrew Hamilton of Allmusic noted the album's decided shift in Paul's musical direction: "Paul's first album for Philadelphia International was straight club jazz; sales were slow. This time, Gamble & Huff gave Paul material strong enough to make his sophomore release a viable commercial entity."

Joe Marchese of The Second Disc called it "one of the mightiest albums ever produced by Kenneth Gamble and Leon Huff."

Chris Wells of Echoes said: "This 1972 set is the first Billy Paul album that most people heard, it being the one that produced Me & Mrs. Jones as lead single. It's amongst his best too, for it also includes the superb mid-tempo Philly roller Brown Baby, a tribute to the kids who took part in the civil rights marches, the eight-minute epic I'm Just A Prisoner, a Gamble-Sigler-Hurtt song that Billy confesses reminded him of a stretch behind bars his step-dad did, and the funky follow-up to Mrs Jones, Am I Black Enough For You?"

== Track listing ==
1. "Brown Baby" – (Kenny Gamble, Leon Huff) – 4:41
2. "I'm Just a Prisoner" – (Kenny Gamble, Phil Hurtt, Bunny Sigler) – 8:05
3. "It's Too Late" – (Carole King, Toni Stern) – 4:39
4. "Me and Mrs. Jones" – (Kenny Gamble, Leon Huff, Cary Gilbert) – 4:52
5. "Am I Black Enough for You?" – (Kenny Gamble, Leon Huff) – 5:22
6. "Let's Stay Together" – (Al Green, Al Jackson Jr., Willie Mitchell) – 6:31
7. "Your Song" – (Elton John, Bernie Taupin) – 6:36
8. "I'm Gonna Make It This Time" – (Jean Lang, Bunny Sigler) – 4:28

2012 CD bonus tracks

9. "Me and Mrs. Jones" (Single Version) – 4:45
10. "Am I Black Enough for You?" (Single Version) – 3:19
11. "Me and Mrs. Jones" (Live Version – from Live in Europe) – 9:04

== Later releases ==
This album was reissued on the Super Audio CD format in September 2018 by UK label Dutton Vocalion, remastered in both stereo and Surround Sound from the original analogue tapes by Michael J. Dutton and released in a 2-disc set with Paul's 1973 album War Of The Gods. The Surround Sound portions of the discs feature the Quadraphonic mixes of both "360 Degrees Of Billy Paul" and "War Of The Gods", made available for the first time in over 40 years.

== Personnel ==
- Billy Paul – lead and backing vocals
- Bobby Eli, Bunny Sigler, David Bay, Norman Harris, Roland Chambers – guitar
- Eddie Green, Leon Huff – piano
- Vincent Montana Jr. – vibraphone
- Anthony Jackson, Ron Baker – bass
- Earl Young, Norman Farrington – drums
- Don Renaldo – horns, strings
- Larry Washington – congas
- Lenny Pakula – organ
- Carla Benson, Evette Benton, Barbara Ingram – backing vocals

Technical

- Kenny Gamble and Leon Huff – producers
- Joe Tarsia – engineering
- Ed Lee – cover design
- Don Hunstein – front cover photo
- Robert Davis – back cover photo

== Charts ==
=== Albums ===
Chart (1973)	Peak position
US Billboard Pop Albums	17
US Billboard Top Soul Albums	1
US R&B/Hip-Hop Catalog Albums (Billboard)	7

== Certifications ==
Region	Certification	Certified units/sales
United States (RIAA)	Gold	500,000^{^}
^{^} Shipments figures based on certification alone.

Singles

Year	Single	Chart positions	
Year	Single	U.S. Billboard Hot 100	US Soul
1972	"Me and Mrs. Jones"	1	1
1973	"Am I Black Enough for You?"	79	29

== See also ==
- List of number-one R&B albums of 1973 (U.S.)
