= Bluesette =

1963 single by Toots Thielemans

- 1964 7" vinyl single cover

Single by Toots Thielemans

from the EP The Main From The Mountain
- B-side: "The Mountain Whistler"
- Released: 1963
- Recorded: 1962
- Label: ABC-Paramount Records
- Songwriter: Toots Thielemans

Bluesette is a jazz standard, composed by Toots Thielemans. First recorded by Toots Thielemans in 1962, with lyrics added by Norman Gimbel, the song became an international hit. It has since been covered by over one hundred artists.

Thielemans received Grammy Award nominations for Best Instrumental Theme in 1964 and Best Jazz Instrumental Solo in 1992 for the song.

In 2000, Bluesette was inducted in the Radio 2 Hall of Fame.

== Selected cover versions ==
=== Instrumental version ===
- Chet Atkins – for his album Progressive Pickin' (1964)
- Tito Puente and his orchestra – (1966)
- Ray Charles – for his album My Kind of Jazz (1970)
- Tony Mottola – included in the album Tony Mottola's Guitar Factory and released as a single (1970)
- Hank Jones – included in the album Bluesette (1979)
- Bobby Enriquez – in the album Live! in Tokyo (1982)
- Laurel Harned - in her performance on @SiccasGuitars channel - (2024)

=== Vocal version, with lyrics by Norman Gimbel ===
- Vikki Carr – for her album Discovery! Miss Vikki Carr (1964)
- Sarah Vaughan – a single release in 1964
- Chet Atkins – for his album Progressive Pickin' (1964)
- Johnny Mathis (1965) (The Complete Global Albums Collection#Singles and Unreleased, Vol. Two)
- The Four Tops – for the album On Top (1966)
- Billy Paul for his album Feelin' Good at the Cadillac Club (1968), as well as single release in 1969
- Sue Raney (1969) – later included in the compilation album Breathless (1997)
- Quincy Jones – for his album Mellow Madness (1975)
- Mel Tormé and Buddy Rich – for the album Together Again: For the First Time (1978)
- Nicole Croisille (1987) – included in the album Jazzille/Jazzy
- Connie Evingson – included in the album Some Cats Know (1999)
