= War of the Gods (album) =

Studio album by Billy Paul
- Released: October 12, 1973
- Recorded: 1973
- Studios: Sigma Sound, Philadelphia, Pennsylvania
- Genres: Soul, Philadelphia soul
- Length: 38:28
- Label: Philadelphia Records
- Producer: Kenny Gamble & Leon Huff

Billy Paul chronology
360 Degrees of Billy Paul (1972)	War of the Gods (1973)	Live in Europe (1974)

Professional ratings
Review scores
Source	Rating
Allmusic	4/5 stars

War of the Gods is an album by soul singer Billy Paul. The album was produced by Kenny Gamble and Leon Huff and arranged by Bobby Martin and Lenny Pakula. Released in 1973, the album reached number 12 on the Billboard soul chart and number 110 on the pop chart. The single "Thanks for Saving My Life" was a top 40 hit, reaching number 37 on the pop chart and was a top-10 soul record reaching number 9. In 2012, Big Break Records remastered and reissued the album on CD with bonus tracks and new liner notes.

== Release and critical reception ==
The outer gatefold image of War of the Gods depicts the full artwork, normally unseen if only the front cover is visible.

The inner gatefold image of War of the Gods depicts Billy Paul on a rocky landscape dressed in colorful garb. Like the front/outer gatefold cover, this image suggests that the music will have a transporting, other-worldly quality.

The white-label, promo only single of "War of the Gods (Part II)" was issued to radio only and has never been made commercially available.

A departure from Paul's previous work, War of the Gods contains only six songs, nearly all of which are extended psychedelic soul song suites fusing jazz, soul, funk, Latin, rock, and pop. In the new liner notes for the 2012 reissue, Paul calls it "the best album I've ever done in my life."

Stephen McMillian recounted Paul's appearance on Soul Train to promote the album:

Billy returned to Soul Train on its January 20, 1974 taping to perform 'Thanks For Saving My Life' and an uptempo danceable tune entitled 'The Whole Town's Talking' from War of the Gods. 'Super smooth Billy,' as Don [Cornelius] referred to him in his introduction of the singer, looked dapper in grey suit and grey hat with the brim of the hat slightly tilted down. During Billy's interview with Don, he mentioned that he had returned from a European tour with The O'Jays and The Intruders, stating that the response was great and very receptive. 'The most amazing thing is to see people who can't understand your language but they enjoy your music and the sound,' Billy told Don."

In addition to the hit single "Thanks for Saving My Life," the album's title track was released as a white label, promo-only single in two different, shorter forms. "War of the Gods (Part I)" was the A-side at 5:37 while "War of the Gods (Part II)" was the B-side at 4:42 (PIR single AE7-1080, 1973). The A-side is included as a bonus track on the BBR 2012 reissue. Also, "The Whole Town's Talking" was issued as a single in the UK (PIR single S 2225, 1974) and that shortened version of the album track also appears on the 2012 reissue as does the 4:00 single version of "I Was Married" (PIR single 3538, 1973).

In 2012, Paul called the album's title track his favorite of his own songs: "It's very spiritual, and it tells people about war. Me and Marvin Gaye were tight and he did 'What's Going On.' I said to him I have to do my version and I went for it. Things that had happened in my life had affected me, and I wanted to tell the world how important it was, how important people were and most importantly how important God was. If anything the song is even more important and relevant today. A lot of my songs have had that effect."

Joe Marchese of The Second Disc provided a detailed review of the BBR reissue, concluding: "Though War of the Gods isn't one of the singer or label's most accessible albums, it's doubtless one of the most provocative and passionate."

== Track listing ==
All tracks composed by Kenny Gamble and Leon Huff, except where indicated.

Side A

1. "I See the Light" – (Kenny Gamble, Leon Huff, Bunny Sigler) 6:13
2. "War of the Gods" – 10:07

Side B

1. "The Whole Town's Talking" – 4:46
2. "I Was Married" – (Kenny Gamble, Leon Huff, Cary Gilbert, Joannie Arc) – 7:19
3. "Thanks for Saving My Life" – 2:58
4. "Peace Holy Peace" – 6:53

CD Bonus tracks (2012 reissue)

1. "War of the Gods (Part I)" (Single Version) – 5:37
2. "The Whole Town's Talking" (Single Version) – 2:45
3. "I Was Married" (Single Version) (Kenny Gamble, Leon Huff, Cary Gilbert, Joannie Arc) – 4:00

== Later releases ==
This album was reissued on the Super Audio CD format in September 2018 by UK label Dutton Vocalion, remastered in both stereo and Surround Sound from the original analogue tapes by Michael J. Dutton and released in a two-disc set with Paul's 1972 album 360 Degrees Of Billy Paul. The Surround Sound portions of the discs feature the Quadraphonic mixes of both "War Of The Gods" and "360 Degrees Of Billy Paul", made available for the first time in over 40 years.

== Personnel ==
- Billy Paul – lead and backing vocals
- Bobby Eli, Bunny Sigler, David Bay, Norman Harris, Roland Chambers – guitar
- Eddie Green, Leon Huff – piano
- Vincent Montana, Jr. – vibraphone
- Anthony Jackson, Ron Baker – bass
- Earl Young, Norman Farrington – drums
- Don Renaldo – horns, strings
- Larry Washington – congas
- Lenny Pakula – organ
- Carla Benson, Evette Benton, Barbara Ingram – background vocals
- The Dandridge Choral Ensemble – vocals on "Peace Holy Peace"
- Roger Hane – cover artwork

== Charts ==
Chart (1974)	Peak position
Billboard Pop Albums	110
Billboard Top Soul Albums	12

=== Singles ===
Year	Single	Chart positions		
Year	Single	U.S. Billboard Hot 100	US Soul	UK
1974	"Thanks for Saving My Life"	37	9	33
