= Zanzibar Blue =

Jazz club in Philadelphia

Zanzibar Blue was a jazz club located in Philadelphia, Pennsylvania. Known for its live jazz each night and for Sunday brunch, it branded itself as "Philadelphia's Premier Jazz Club". Owned by brothers Robert and Benjamin Jr. Bynum, the club was located in Center City, Philadelphia below the Bellevue on the Avenue of the Arts. Zanzibar Blue opened in 1990 on 11th Street, between Spruce and Pine Streets and later moved to the Bellevue in 1996. The club closed on April 29, 2007, Robert Bynum stating, "we didn't think it was in our best interests to renew [the lease]. We'd rather own [our] building than lease." WJJZ, Philadelphia's smooth jazz radio station broadcast Sunday brunches from Zanzibar Blue, and performers such as Lou Rawls, Chick Corea and Chuck Mangione have played there.
