= Am I Black Enough for You? (song) =

Single by Billy Paul

from the album 360 Degrees Of Billy Paul
- B-side: "I'm Gonna Make It This Time"
- Released: 1973
- Studio: Sigma Sound, Philadelphia, Pennsylvania
- Genre: R&B, Philly soul
- Length: 3:19
- Label: Philadelphia International
- Songwriter(s): Kenny Gamble, Leon Huff
- Producer(s): Kenny Gamble and Leon Huff

Billy Paul singles chronology
"Me and Mrs. Jones" (1972)	"Am I Black Enough for You?" (1973)	"Thanks for Saving My Life" (1973)

"Am I Black Enough for You?" is a 1972 soul song written by Kenny Gamble and Leon Huff and recorded by Billy Paul for his album 360 Degrees of Billy Paul on Philadelphia International Records. Released as a single in April 1973 it failed to replicate the chart success of Paul's previous number-one smash "Me and Mrs. Jones", instead reaching #79 on the Billboard pop chart and #29 on the soul chart.

== Release and reception ==
This up-tempo funk song with a political message was a considerable departure for audiences expecting the smooth balladry of Paul's previous single, although that track dealt with the social issue of adultery. AllMusic's Andrew Hamilton said that the song "fit in with the times of overt black consciousness, a social message moved along by a perky bongo and clavinet-dominated beat, and well-spaced, brassy horn hits."

We're gonna move on up, one by one
We ain't gonna stop 'till the work gets done
Am I black enough for you?

-Lyrics from "Am I Black Enough For You?"

In his 2005 article "Message in the Music: Political Commentary in Black Popular Music from Rhythm and Blues to Early Hip Hop," Professor James B. Stewart wrote: "The Black Power Movement and the emphasis on black pride arising in the mid-1960s and blossoming in the early 1970s inspired several Defiant Challenge commentaries that incorporated Black Power ideological elements. Representative songs articulating the theme of black pride include James Brown's 'Say It Loud' (1969) and Billy Paul's 'Am I Black Enough for You?'.... Gamble and Huff's lyrics emphasize the need for listeners to continue struggling until the goals have been achieved and to be steadfast in embracing their black identity, as expressed in the turn of phrase, 'stay Black enough for you'."

And while the song may have been empowering to the African American community, white audiences did not embrace it. Author John A. Jackson questioned Kenny Gamble's choice to issue this "unlikely," "inadvisable" single on the heels of "Me and Mrs. Jones" calling it "confrontational...a defiant paean to black pride and resolve.... [with] an oppositionist attitude." At the time, Paul explained the choice in a 1973 interview:

"Well, I have to be honest. This wasn't the one that I really wanted. But the company felt I had to get over to the black audience this time round. And there can be no arguing about that — the record is one of the top sellers in the black areas and one of the most requested records around the stations. I don't really think anybody expected it to be a pop hit — that's reserved for the next one, which is the one I wanted all along — 'Brown Baby'."

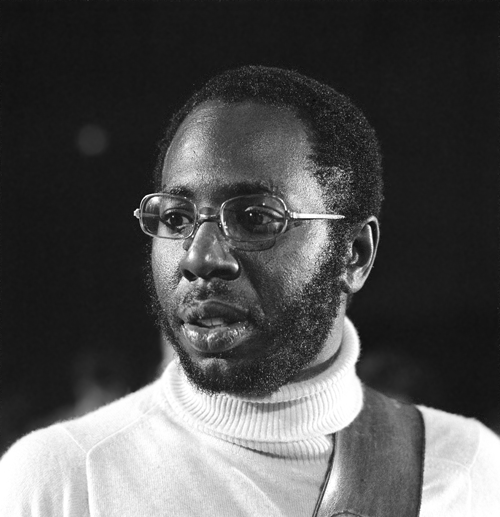
African American artists such as Curtis Mayfield (pictured) and Billy Paul were blackballed by white, mainstream radio for the content of their music.

Jackson noted that "the song's inciting title and subject matter resulted in limited airplay" and the result was nothing short of a "fiasco" for Paul's career, which never recovered.

If "Me and Mrs. Jones" suggested that Paul was a talent on the path to rivaling Curtis Mayfield and Marvin Gaye, "Am I Black Enough for You?" quickly dispelled any of such notions in the minds of many. Journalist Stephen McMillian wrote: "'Am I Black Enough For You,' was deemed militant by pop radio stations and it had been said that his music was blackballed thereafter (a similar fate happened to Curtis Mayfield's music on pop radio after the mega success of the Super Fly movie soundtrack)." In his review of the 2012 reissue of 360 Degrees of Billy Paul, Joe Marchese noted: "Less commercially successful [than 'Me and Mrs. Jones'] was the driving 'Am I Black Enough for You?' also from Gamble and Huff. Today, the singer regrets the decision to have the funky track follow 'Mrs. Jones,' despite its potent message and smoking production."

While Paul may have regretted the choice to use the song as the follow-up to a #1 pop hit, he does not regret the song in general. He reflected on the song after a Swedish filmmaker produced a feature-length documentary about the song and his life (see below):

"I am very popular in Sweden and this film maker Göran, he liked ‘Am I Black Enough’. ‘Am I Black Enough ‘is popular in Sweden, and the funny thing about it is ‘Am I Black Enough’ is more popular now than before and more popular among white people too. And that’s the good thing about it. When it first came out I had reservations right after ‘Me & Mrs Jones.’ But now it has caught up with time, and I thought it was a good title for the film. I thought it hit on the points of me being good friends with Martin Luther King. The music was timely you know, everything fitted - the civil rights area. Everything fitted very well."

Paul regularly performed the song live, but not necessarily for reasons one might expect. He explained in a 2012 interview: "'Am I Black Enough' is now one of the most requested songs by white people."

=== Chart performance ===
Year	Chart positions	
Year	U.S. Billboard Hot 100	US Soul
1973	79	29

== Covers and use in popular culture ==
Jamaican reggae group The Chosen Few covered the song in 1973. It was produced by Derrick Harriott.

Rapper Schoolly D sampled the song on a track of the same name on his Jive Records album Am I Black Enough for You (1989). The sample appears at 1:51 and throughout.

The shows Soul Train and One Hit Wonderland and 1989 movie King of New York used the song.

The song was the subject of a documentary of the same name, about Paul, which was released in 2009. It received mixed and positive reviews.
