= Billy Paul =

American soul singer (1934–2016)

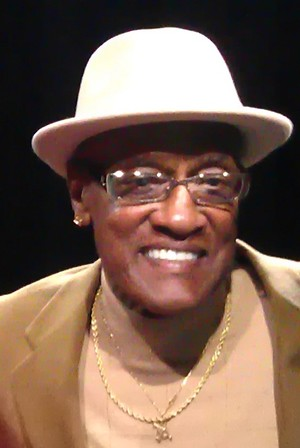
- Paul in 2012

Background information
- Born: Paul Williams; December 1, 1934; Philadelphia, Pennsylvania, U.S.
- Died: April 24, 2016 (aged 81) Blackwood, New Jersey, U.S.
- Genres: Soul; R&B; jazz; disco
- Occupation: Singer
- Years active: 1952–2016
- Website: billyp7.wixsite.com/soul-artist

Paul Williams (December 1, 1934 – April 24, 2016), known professionally as Billy Paul, was an American soul singer, known for his 1972 No. 1 single "Me and Mrs. Jones". His 1973 album and single War of the Gods blends his more conventional pop, soul, and funk styles with electronic and psychedelic influences.

He was one of the many artists associated with the Philadelphia soul sound created by Kenny Gamble, Leon Huff, and Thom Bell. Paul was identified by his diverse vocal style, which ranged from mellow and soulful to low and raspy. Questlove of the Roots equated Paul with Marvin Gaye and Stevie Wonder, calling him "one of the criminally unmentioned proprietors of socially conscious post-revolution '60s civil rights music."

== Life and career ==
=== Early years ===
Paul was raised in North Philadelphia. His love of music began at a young age, listening at home to his family's music collection.

He recalled: "That's how I really got indoctrinated into music. My mother was always...collecting records and she would buy everything from Jazz at Philharmonic Hall to Nat King Cole." He began singing along and tried to emulate the records he heard: "I always liked Nat King Cole. I always wanted to go my own way, but I always favored other singers like Dinah Washington, Sarah Vaughan, Ella Fitzgerald – I loved Ella Fitzgerald. There are so many of them. Nina Simone was one of my favorites – Johnny Mathis, They all had a style, a silkiness about them.... I wanted to sing silky, like butter – mellow. I wanted to sing mellow you know what I mean. One of my favorites is Jessie Belvin – they used to call him Mr. Easy. A lot of people forgot about him you know – Sam Cooke is another one of my favorites."

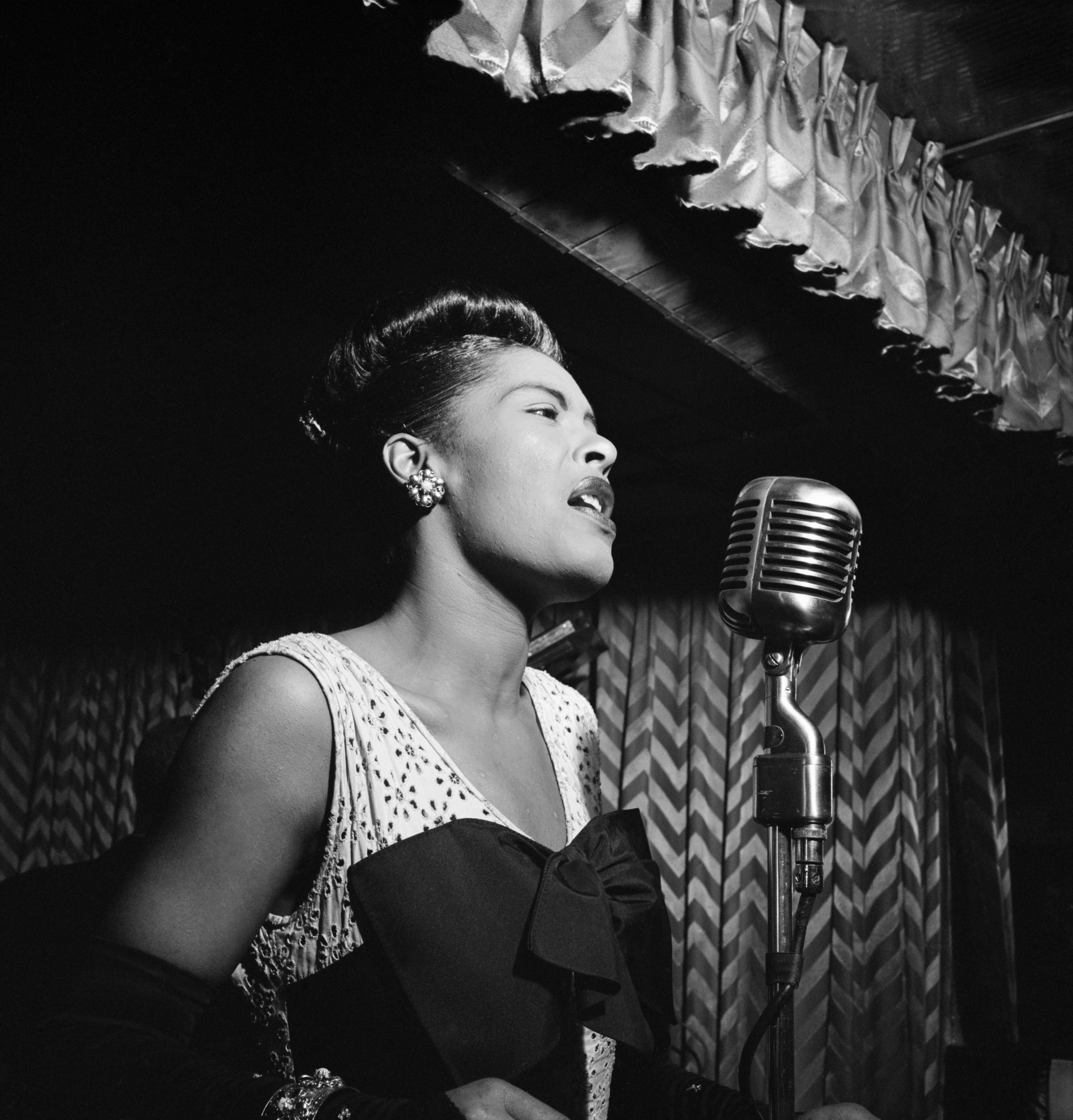
Billy Paul was heavily influenced by jazz vocalist Billie Holiday.

Paul explained why he was particularly influenced by female jazz singers: "I think the reason behind that is because of my high range. The male singers who had the same range I did, when I was growing up, didn't do much for me. But put on Nina Simone, Carmen McRae or Nancy Wilson, and I'd be in seventh heaven. Female vocalists just did more with their voices, and that's why I paid more attention to them." Perhaps the female vocalist who had the most impact on him was Billie Holiday, whom he called "a BIG influence". He began developing a vocal style that would eventually incorporate traces of jazz, R&B, and pop.

He began his singing career at the age of 11, appearing on local radio station WPEN, then owned by the local Philadelphia Bulletin newspaper. He attended the West Philadelphia Music School and the Granoff School of Music for formal vocal training. He recalled: "Well you know, it was something that my mum would say I needed, holding my notes you know, and delivering my notes. It gave me assurity, cos my mother was 100% behind me and it created the style and uniqueness of Billy Paul. All my life I wanted to sound like myself, I never wanted to sound like anybody else. How that occurred was cause I always wanted to be a saxophone player....I took my uniqueness and treated it like a horn, which created a good style for me."

When I was 16, I played the Club Harlem in Philly and I was on the same bill as Charlie Parker. He died later that year. I was there with him for a week and I learned what it would normally take two years to pick up. Bird told me if I kept struggling I'd go a long way, and I've never forgotten his words.

— Billy Paul

Paul's popularity grew and led to appearances in clubs and at college campuses nationally. He changed his name from Paul Williams to Billy Paul so as to avoid any confusion with other artists such as songwriter Paul Williams and saxophonist Paul "Hucklebuck" Williams. He explained: "I had Jules Malvin, who was like my play father. He was my manager at the time. He took me up to the Apollo and I warmed the Apollo for six weeks and that's where he gave me the name Billy Paul. I didn't question it."

=== First recordings ===
In 1952, he traveled to New York City and entered the recording studio for Jubilee Records. Backed by Tadd Dameron on piano and Jackie Davis on the Hammond organ, Paul released his first single that April: "Why Am I" with "That's Why I Dream" as the B-side (Jubilee Records 5081, both written by Bernard Sacks and B. Sidney Zeff). Billboard reviewed the tracks favorably, saying of "Why Am I" that it was "Expressive warbling of a moody ballad, by the label's new 16-year-old chanter", and of "That's Why I Dream": "Organ and piano lend the singer a hand in this slow-paced etching of a romantic number".

In June 1952, Paul released his second single – this time collaborating with the Buddy Lucas Orchestra – "You Didn't Know", backed with "The Stars Are Mine" (Jubilee Records 5086). Billboard was again positive, saying about "You Didn't Know" – "Billy Paul, new young singer, makes an impressive bow on the label with a strong performance of a weeper ballad which should pick up spins and plays. The Lucas ork furnishes okay backing. A good disk" and about "The Stars Are Mine" – "Paul sings this new tune more quietly, over a smooth ork reading. Side is not as exciting as flip and tune is not as strong." A few weeks later, Jubilee took out an ad in Billboard to promote their artists in anticipation of the annual NAMM Show – the music industry trade convention put on by the National Association of Music Merchants (NAMM). Jubilee plugged Paul's latest single and noted: "He's New – He's Hot!" Despite Jubilee's efforts, none of the tracks by the young singer made the charts.

=== Army years and resumption of professional career ===
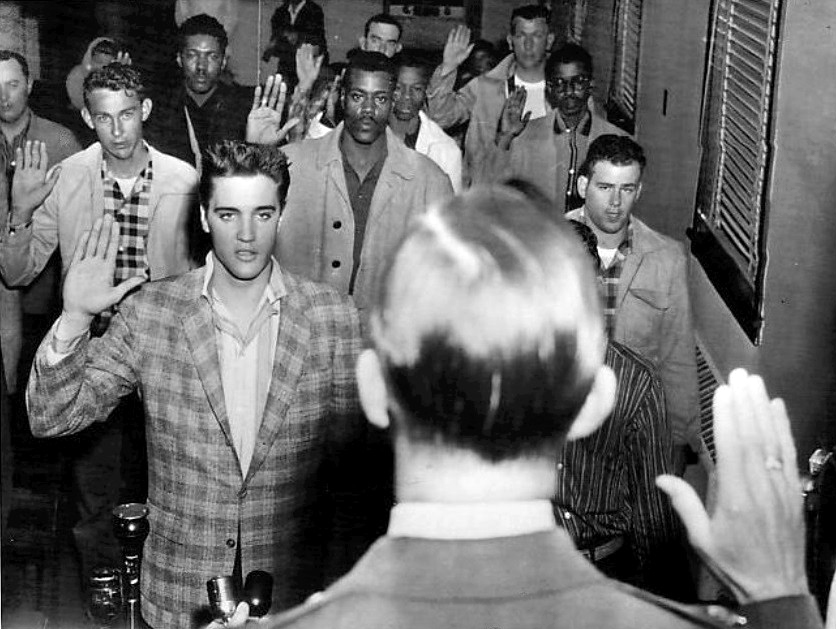
Billy Paul served with Elvis Presley and a number of other musicians in post-World War II Germany.

Paul's career took an unexpected turn when he was drafted into the Armed Services. He recalled:

I went in, in 1957, and I was stationed with Elvis Presley and Gary Crosby – Bing Crosby's son. We were in Germany and we said we're going to start a band, so we didn't have to do any hard work in the service. We tried to get Elvis to join but he wanted to be a jeep driver. So me and Gary Crosby, we started it and called ourselves the Jazz Blues Symphony Band. Some famous people came out of that band; Cedar Walton, Eddie Harris and we toured all over Germany. Elvis didn't wanna join us. I used to see him every day but he drove the jeep for the Colonel. He didn't want to join our band. He wanted to get away from music for a while, while he was in the service you know.

Paul and the other members of the 7th Army Band, including Don Ellis, Leo Wright and Ron Anthony, used the service to further their musical careers as best they could—careers they knew would continue once they returned to civilian life. Paul said: "I sang in the service, I sang with a jazz band. So when I came out I sang Jazz, going to clubs and so forth.

Paul also did some boxing in the Army – a sport he had grown up with, as he explained in a 2012 interview: "Yeah we had a gym and all my friends from my neighborhood were boxers. Even during my army days I boxed as well as singing. Actually I still go to the gym; both me and my wife have trainers... Miles Davis would always say: 'Come to the gym! I'm gonna beat your ass!' Then one time I got hit too hard and I said no I'm going to sing!... That made my mind up."

After his discharge, Paul formed a jazz trio with hard bop pianist Sam Dockery and bassist Buster Williams. In 1959 he joined the New Dawn record label and released the single "Ebony Woman" backed with "You'll Go to Hell" (New Dawn 1001), both written by Morris Bailey Jr. In 1960, Paul recorded "There's a Small Hotel" (Finch 1005, written by Rodgers and Hart), backed with "I'm Always A Brother" (Finch 1006, written by Leon Mitchell and Charles Gaston). None of these songs charted, but Paul would resurrect and re-record both "Ebony Woman" and "There's a Small Hotel" in later years.

I always saw myself as a solo artist.

— Billy Paul

Paul was a brief stand-in for one of the ailing Blue Notes, with Harold Melvin. Paul remembered: "Well, I didn't want to dance so Harold Melvin fired me (laughs). I had a six month stay with the Flamingos – I was with The Flamingos for a while." It was around this time that Paul established a lifelong friendship with Marvin Gaye—both singers filling in with other groups. Paul recalled: "I was one of the Blue Notes at one time and Marvin Gaye was in the Moonglows.... We were such good friends. We never did a record together and that would have been one of my dreams. And you know what one of my fascinations is? What we would be doing if he were here today. I think about Marvin every day. The love I have for this man is unbelievable. We were close, we were like brothers. When I would go on the road out in California, he would go round to the house – he and Blanche (Billy's wife) [would] make sure Blanche's mother would take her insulin because she was a diabetic. I would heavily depend on him to make sure she ate and took her insulin. That's how close we were. You know sometimes, even today. I wake up and hope it was a dream, but it's real – it's real you know."

=== Philadelphia soul years ===
In 2012, Paul was asked how important the city of Philadelphia was to him and what the Philly sound is: "It's very very important to me. I was born here and so many great and influential artists come from here as well. Its a city of its own and has its own sound. I think what makes it different is the drama; you know how they say everyone marches to their own beat? Well I think Philly has its own beat as well, and it's distinctive. It sounds easy, but it's hard to play."

==== Neptune and Gamble releases ====
Paul and his wife and manager Blanche Williams were in the process of recording his debut album when they met Kenny Gamble. Paul recalled:

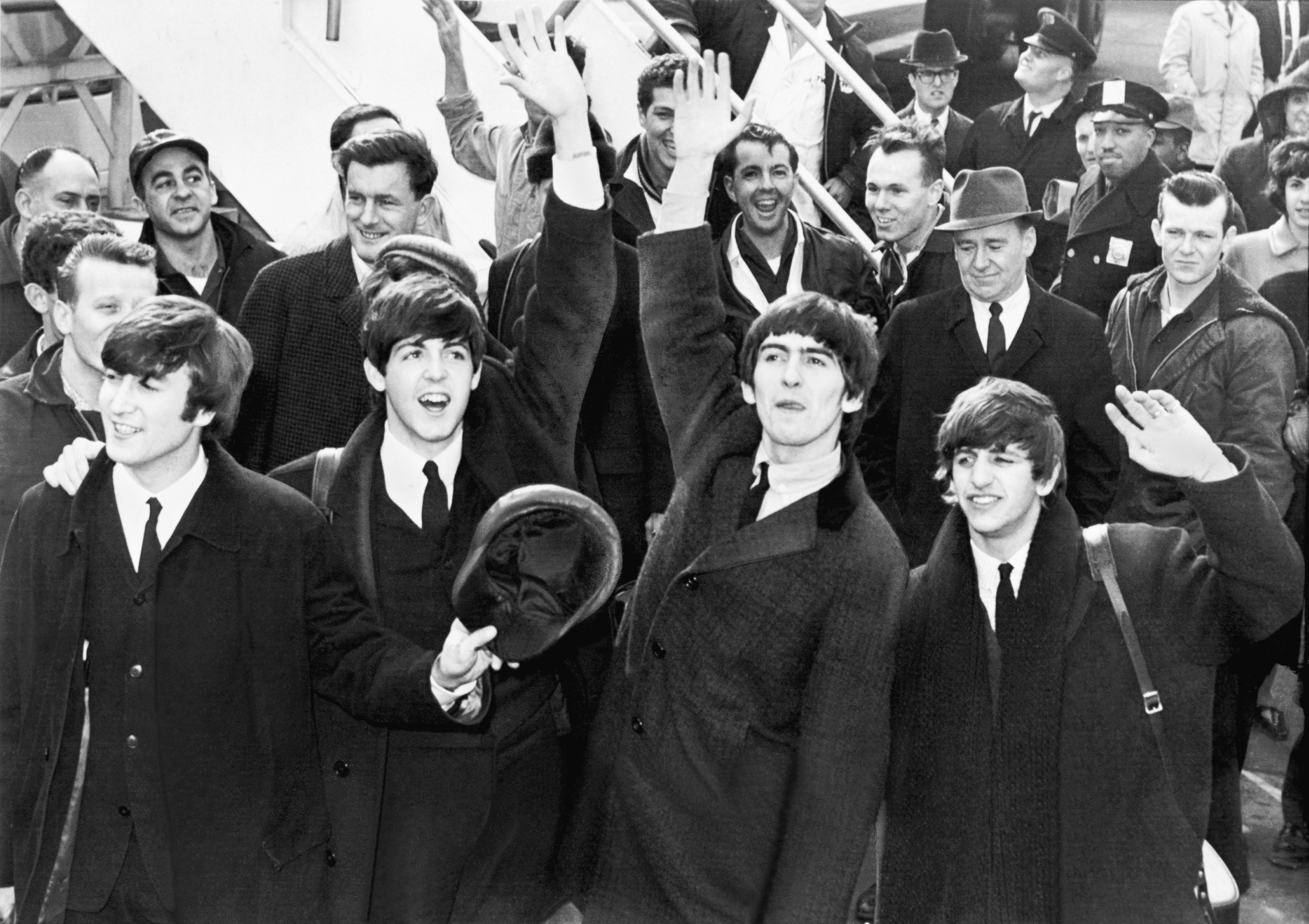
Billy Paul cited the Beatles as the key influence on his musical growth from jazz to other musical genres.

I was singing in a jazz club called the Sahara. He had a record shop on South St & Philly – right round the corner and I was singing with a trio at the Sahara club on Friday, Saturday, and Sunday. He came over and said 'I am starting a record company and I would like to sign you.' Low [sic] and behold I took all the material I sung every weekend and I did an album in three and a half hours – a whole album. I had this album, and I produced it – me and my wife. And we gave him this album called Feelin' Good at the Cadillac Club to help start the record company and that was the album that helped start it up. I was singing totally Jazz then, but when I heard the Beatles and heard the gospel influence and everything I just said: 'I can make jazz with R&B.' That transition came when The Beatles came out to America. When I heard The Beatles that was my turning point. They were like my mentors. You know the funny thing about that, when I heard (Billy sings) 'I Wanna Hold Your Hand', at first I said these guys are like a flash in the pan. But the second album when they started doing all this, I had to like take all that back. John Lennon – one of the greatest writers in the world.

Paul's debut album Feelin' Good at the Cadillac Club was released in 1968 on the Gamble label. Largely a collection of jazz covers of songs popularized by others, it was a studio album that attempted to recreate the feel of Paul's live club performances. Neither the single "Bluesette" nor the album reached the charts. The album was re-released in 1973.

Paul's second LP, Ebony Woman (1970), was a more commercial release on Gamble & Huff's Neptune label. Paul cut a new version of his 1959 single and made it the title track. Gamble & Huff were firmly in control of the production. Merging jazz and soul, the LP achieved some modest success reaching No. 12 on the Billboard soul chart and No. 183 on the pop chart.

==== Philadelphia International releases ====
After Neptune folded, Gamble and Huff started their third label – Philadelphia International Records (PIR) – and brought Paul with them. Gamble and Huff signed a distribution deal with Clive Davis and CBS Records.

Going East (1971) was the first Billy Paul album released on the Philadelphia International Records label, making full use of the label's regular group of ace musicians MFSB at Sigma Sound Studios. As they had done on the previous LP, Gamble and Huff sought to find the balance between Paul's jazz roots and the funky soul that they hoped would bring mainstream success. Paul nearly reached the charts with the single "Magic Carpet Ride" (cover of the 1968 Steppenwolf hit) and the album climbed to No. 42 on the Billboard soul chart and No. 197 on the pop chart.

The good thing about Gamble and Huff is, nobody sounded alike, everybody had their own sound and that was the distinctive part that kept coming.

— Billy Paul

===== "Me and Mrs. Jones" and international fame =====
With each album, Gamble and Huff were moving closer to realizing the sound they envisioned for Billy Paul, and they achieved it with the 1972 album 360 Degrees of Billy Paul and the single "Me and Mrs. Jones". Both the album and song received commercial and critical acclaim.

"Me and Mrs. Jones" was a No. 1 hit for the last three weeks of 1972, selling two million copies (platinum single status), and went on to win Paul a Grammy Award. The gold album and platinum single broke the artist on world charts, including the United Kingdom, where the single entered the Top 20 of the UK Singles Chart, reaching No. 12 in early 1973. In the years since then, the song has been covered numerous times, most notably by The Dramatics in 1974, Freddie Jackson in 1992 and Michael Bublé in 2007. Paul recalled the Grammy win and the song's overall success: "Oh man! I was up against Ray Charles, I was up against Curtis Mayfield, I was up against Isaac Hayes. I was in the Wilberforce University in Ohio, I had to go do a homecoming – my wife and her mother went. And when I see Ringo Starr call my name, I said Ohhh... Yeah... The most sobering thing is to have a number one record across the whole entire world in all languages. It's a masterpiece, it's a classic."

The song was PIR's first No. 1. In addition, the label was enjoying considerable success with their other artists, including the O'Jays and Harold Melvin & the Blue Notes. Paul remembered the atmosphere at the label: "It was like a family full of music. It was like music round the clock, you know."

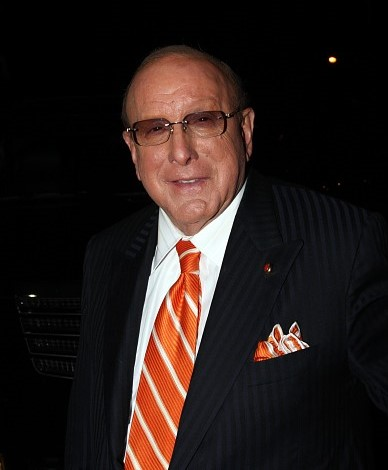
Music executive Clive Davis has consistently praised Paul's recording of "Am I Black Enough for You?"

===== "Am I Black Enough" controversy =====
Paul's massive success was short-lived. The follow-up single – "Am I Black Enough for You?" – failed to reach the heights of "Mrs. Jones", with the song's Black Power political message proving too much for mainstream radio's taste. There was much controversy surrounding the choice to release this track as the follow-up to a cross-over smash hit.

In a 1977 interview, Paul made plain that he opposed the choice from the beginning:

I think though that a lot of mistakes were made at the time. The biggest one was releasing 'Am I Black Enough For You' straight after 'Mrs. Jones'. People weren't ready for that kind of a song after the pop success of 'Mrs. Jones'. They were looking for a sequel or at least something that wasn't provocative. You'll remember at the time that I told you I was 100% against it and history has proven me right. But though it was a company mistake, I'm still satisfied with both CBS and Philadelphia International. However if I had released a different track I may have reached the heights of Michael Jackson.

Decades later, Paul was more philosophical about the song: "That was what I had with 'Am I Black Enough.' I wanted – I'm gonna make it this time and come out. I think it's true to the audience, cos they look for something to come out compared to Mrs. Jones and that was Clive Davis' idea to do that. I think it was Kenny and Clive Davis, but I think it was mostly Clive Davis." For his part, Davis has said that he opposed releasing the song as a single. Still, Davis called it an "all time great record, all time great performance". Gamble, the co-writer and producer of the track, said the song "was great and Billy sounded great doing it". Paul reflected: "Well you know... For a long time I was angry about it, I had a bit of a letdown. Now the song is ahead of its time. I feel as though I let the song down when I went into my darkness. I feel like I abandoned the song. And I'm still going to get to the bottom of 'Am I Black Enough'."

We're gonna move on up
One by one
We ain't gonna stop
Until the work is done

— Billy Paul, "Am I Black Enough for You?"

Ultimately, 360 Degrees of Billy Paul reached No. 1 on the Billboard soul chart and No. 17 on the pop chart. Despite the disappointment over the chart performance of "Am I Black Enough", there was no reason to believe that he could not replicate the album's success or reach even greater heights. In May 1973, while still promoting 360 Degrees of Billy Paul, he was asked about a follow-up LP: "I'm afraid that there will be something of a delay. As of right now, there are two sides actually completed. I have to tell you about one of them — Kenny and Leon wrote it especially and it's a definite single at some point. It's called 'I Was Married' and I honestly think it will be bigger than 'Me and Mrs. Jones'. But for me, there are still two singles from the 360 Degrees album — 'Brown Baby' and 'I'm Just a Prisoner'. But, we are starting to work on the album more seriously from May 15." Despite Paul's enthusiasm, neither "Brown Baby" or "I'm Just a Prisoner" were released in U.S., although "Brown Baby" was issued in the UK but failed to chart.

"Me and Mrs. Jones" was such a huge hit that Gamble and Huff decided to re-release Paul's first two albums, Feelin' Good at the Cadillac Club and Ebony Woman. Reissued in 1973, both albums featured new cover art and were a boon to new fans hungry for Billy Paul product who had already purchased his first two PIR LPs. Still, neither reissue was terribly successful, with only Ebony Woman re-entering the album charts at No. 186 Pop and No. 43 Soul.

Paul's next album, War of the Gods, was the follow-up to 360 Degrees of Billy Paul and was issued in November 1973. Unique in Paul's catalog, it contains lengthy psychedelic soul, song suites and marked a conceptual and musical advance for Paul that did not go unrecognized by critics and fans. And while the LP and its singles enjoyed some success, Paul was unable to repeat the kind of wide impact he had with his previous album and "Mrs. Jones". The War of the Gods single "Thanks for Saving My Life", backed with "I Was Married" as the B-side, was a top-40 hit, reaching No. 37 on the pop chart and a top-10 soul record, reaching No. 9. It also reached No. 33 in the UK.

Paul's 1973 European tour with the O'Jays and the Intruders spawned his first true live album: Live in Europe. Recorded in London and released in 1974, it reached No. 10 on the Billboard Soul Album chart and No. 187 on the pop chart.

Got My Head on Straight was released in 1975 and was an attempt to return to the successful formula of 360 Degrees of Billy Paul. A collection of jazzy, soulful, funky, pop songs, it reached No. 140 on the Billboard Pop Album chart and No. 20 on the Soul chart. It included the singles "Be Truthful to Me" (No. 37 R&B); "Billy's Back Home" (No. 52 R&B); and "July, July, July, July", which did not chart. Despite the attempted return to form, the lack of mainstream success was a major disappointment to Paul, Gamble and Huff, and everyone at PIR.

===== Jesse Jackson controversy =====
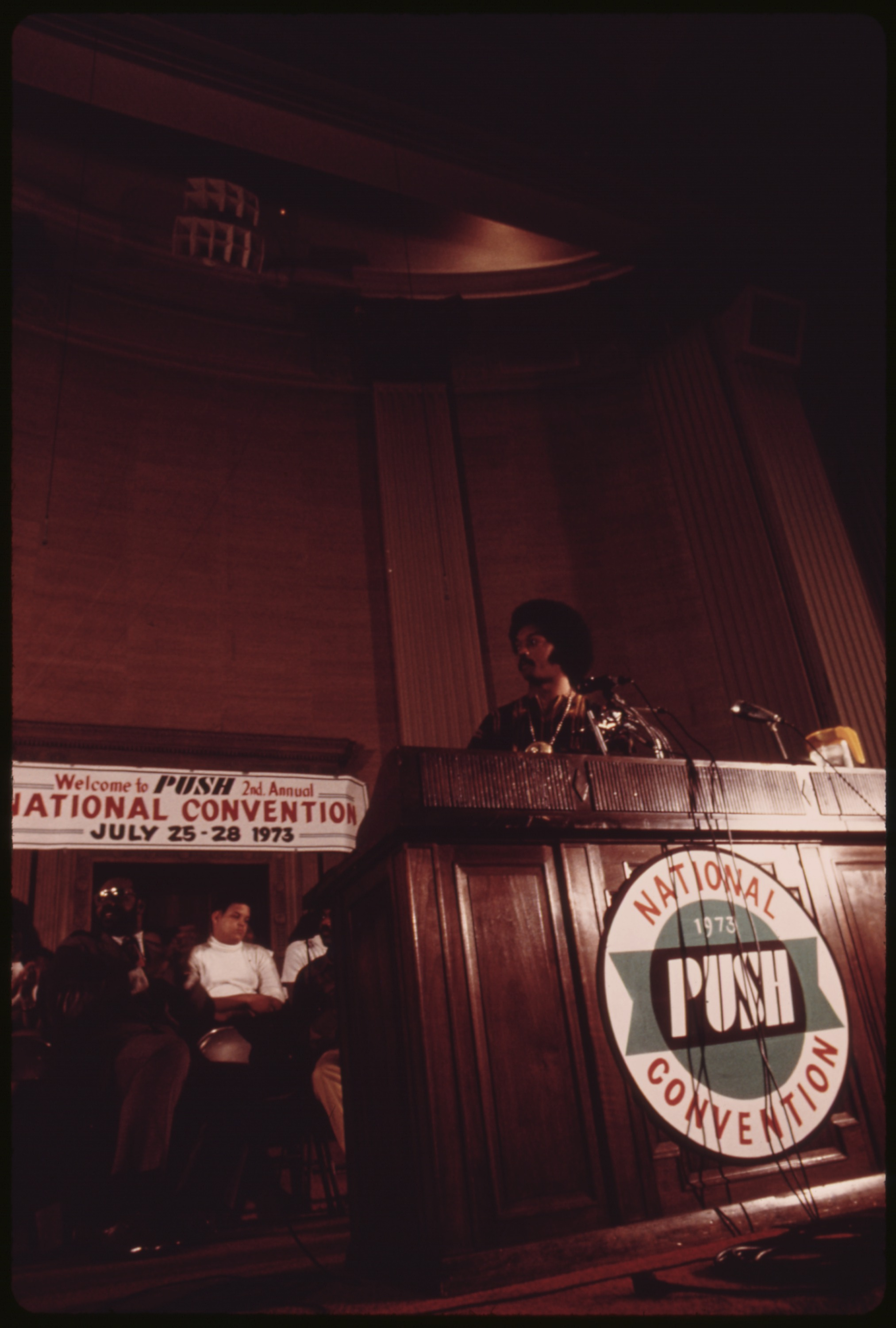
Paul was twice embroiled in controversy with Reverend Jesse Jackson, over the content of his songs.

His album When Love Is New followed in the same vein as its predecessor and had a similar fate. Released in December 1975, it reached No. 139 on the Billboard Pop Album chart and No. 17 on the Soul chart. It included the singles "Let's Make a Baby", which hit No. 83 on the Pop singles chart (the last record of Paul's to make that chart), No. 18 on the Soul chart and No. 30 in the UK, and "People Power", which reached No. 82 on the Soul chart and No. 14 on the U.S. Dance chart.

Come on, come on, let's make a baby
Oh, baby, come on, come on
Let's bring another life into this world
A little boy, a little girl
Take my hand while we walk slowly to the room
Can't you see tonight I'm gonna make sweet, sweet love to you?
.... Let's put wisdom in his head
So he'll never look back, he'll look straight ahead
We'll teach him the truth and understand the meaning of it all
So he can walk around with his head held tall

— Billy Paul, "Let's Make a Baby"

"Let's Make a Baby" proved controversial and there were calls to ban or alter the track because of its supposed obscene or negative message. Jesse Jackson and Operation PUSH led the movement against this song and others such as Hall & Oates's "Rich Girl" and the Four Tops' "Catfish". The campaign was waged locally, with individual stations making their own choices about how to handle the matter. For example, leading R&B station WWRL in New York City played "Let's Make a Baby" but decided not to announce its title. Other stations went so far as to alter the lyrics. Privately, several black disc jockeys described the controversy as "Jessie's phony crusade against sex on the air." The disc jockeys – who refused to allow their names to be used for fear of reprisals – accused Jackson of being "absolutely dishonest" about the campaign, with one popular radio personality making reference to Richard Pryor's 1975 appearance at one of Jackson's events:

This man suddenly discovered sexy recordings when several of our black recording artists began to stop performing for nothing at his annual Black Expos. Remember, this is the same Jackson who presented at one of his Black Expos the filthiest recording comedian in show business. And that comedian was filthy that night at the Amphitheater. It got so bad that parents and their children could be seen leaving the place.

The disc jockeys further pointed out that Jackson was not critical of other artists, such as Roberta Flack and the Brothers Johnson, who had similarly suggestive songs like "Jesse" and "Get the Funk Out of My Face" but who were supporters of Operation PUSH. Several radio veterans were convinced that Jackson's actions were little more than a publicity stunt, calling it "just another of his gimmicks, which he will soon drop for another, just to stay in the news."

For his part, Jackson responded:

We have not...leveled 'blasts at Billy Paul.' We have carefully and consciously avoided 'blasts' at specific entertainers and instead have focused on specific records – of which Billy Paul's 'Let's Make a Baby' is only one in a whole series, increasingly explicit and dominant in a market almost exclusively directed at children....Love and romance are part of life and we are not suggesting that these subjects should be 'censored' in record lyrics. Our appeal has been directed toward pornographic lyrics that degrade human sexuality rather than uplifting the human spirit. The lyrics change in Billy Paul's record was decided upon independently by WVON radio. Mr. Paul has not protested to WVON about the change. The allegation that we have 'suddenly discovered sexy records' because artists have stopped performing for nothing at PUSH EXPO is patently false....The fact that several artists performed at EXPO who have songs we find objectionable is further evidence that our concerns are directed not at the artist but at the record.

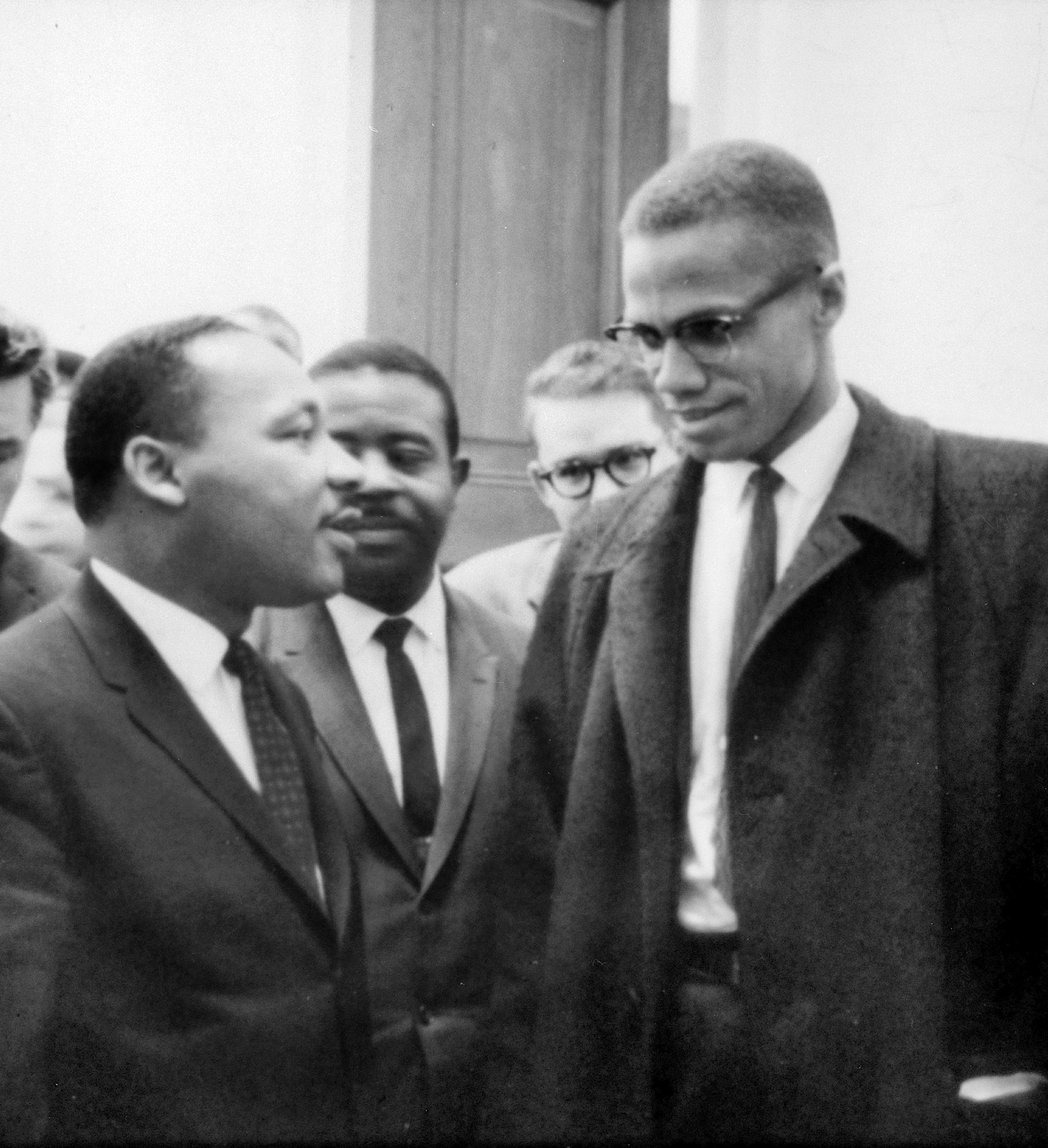
Billy Paul paid homage to fallen civil rights leaders including Martin Luther King Jr. and Malcolm X in his version of Paul McCartney's 1976 hit "Let 'Em In".

Surprisingly, the controversy only escalated with the release of Paul's next album, Let 'Em In in late 1976. The title track was a funky soul version of Paul McCartney's No. 3 U.S. hit from earlier that summer. While McCartney's version was heavy on personal references and comparatively light on political figures, Billy Paul's version turned the formula on its head to become a kind of civil rights anthem – albeit one with a personal touch due to the mention of his recently deceased twin sister Pauline Williams. As where McCartney only obliquely refers to "Brother John" (John Lennon or brother-in-law John Eastman or John F. Kennedy) and "Martin Luther" (the martyred civil rights leader or the 16th-century theologian), Billy Paul's version is far more explicit in reciting a list of deceased civil rights leaders (Elijah Muhammad, Malcolm X, Martin Luther King Jr., John F. Kennedy, Robert F. Kennedy, Medgar Evers, and Louis Armstrong). Furthermore, interspersed with Billy Paul's verses are memorable passages of speeches by Malcolm X and King.

Pauline Williams, Was my twin
Elijah and Malcolm, Still our friends
Brother Martin, We can't forget John
Bobby and Medgar, Louis Armstrong!

— Billy Paul, "Let 'Em In"

Yet, just as they had done with "Let's Make a Baby", WVON – Chicago's oldest black-oriented radio station – altered the song. This time an engineer at the station spliced in a parts of a speech by Jesse Jackson as a substitute for parts of King's speech. Chicago Tribune columnist Gary Deeb said the station "mutilated" the song, doing so in order to solidify ties with Jackson, and called the whole episode "simply ridiculous". Paul was furious and said that he had the "shock of my life" when he learned of the alteration.

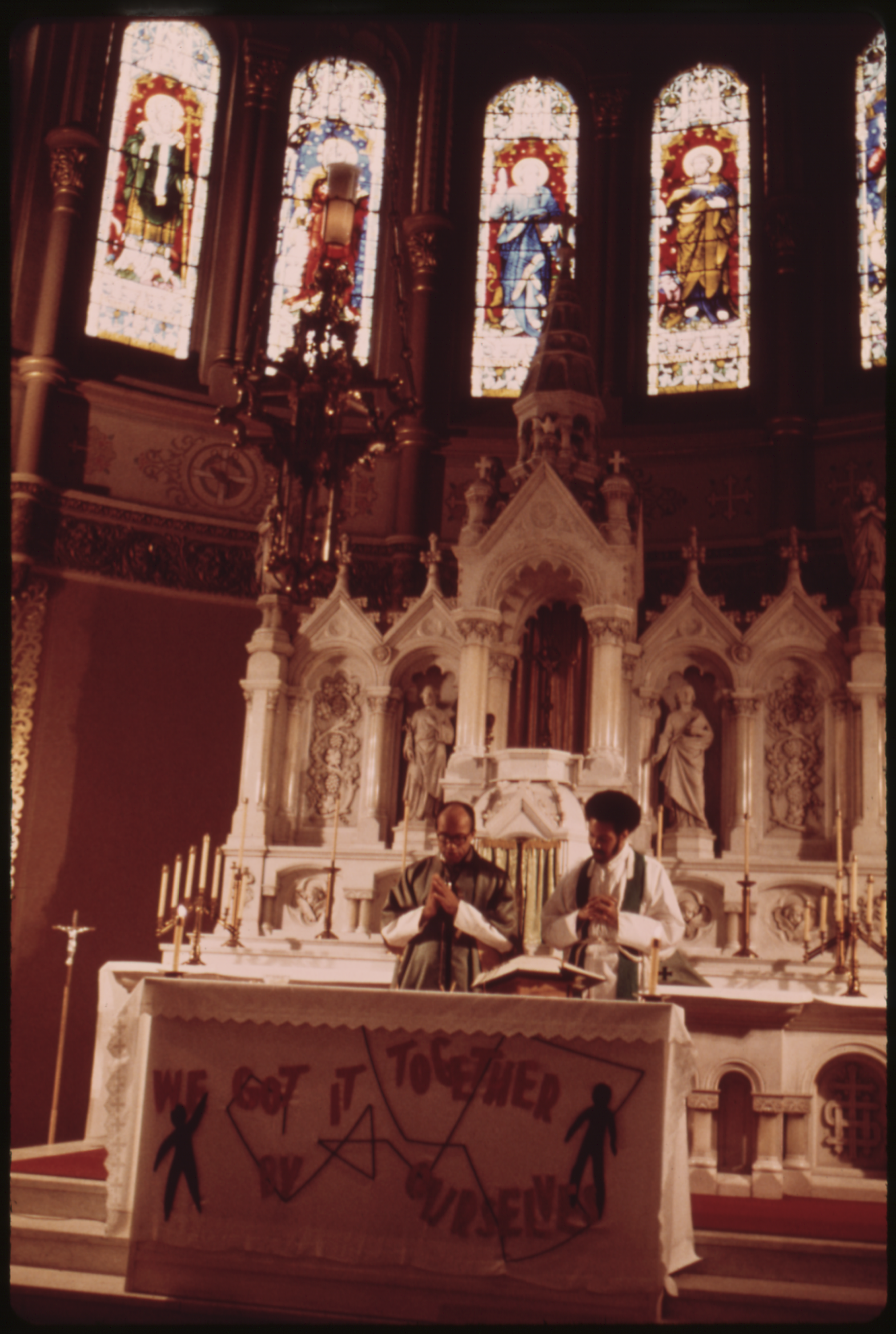
Reverend George Clements (left) honored Paul for the song "Let 'Em In".

Reverend George Clements, the crusading pastor of Holy Angels Catholic Church on the South Side of Chicago, presented Paul with an award for the song on Billy Paul Day, May 23, 1977, that included a ceremony at the church with the church's school choir performing the song. When informed of the honor by Father Clements, Paul reportedly cried tears of joy. Clements said:

In an age of cynicism, suspicion and outright despair, it's uplifting to hear the kind of message that Billy Paul is giving all of us over the radio. Billy Paul is telling us that the dreamers, like Dr. Martin Luther King, are dead now, but it is time to let their dreams begin to come into our souls and begin to make an impact on our society. Congratulations to Billy Paul. Truly he has made a hit, not just with the general public, but also with Almighty God!

In all, Let 'Em In was Paul's first LP to crack the top 100 pop album chart since 1972's 360 Degrees of Billy Paul, reaching No. 88. Paul also had his usual success on the Soul charts, with the album hitting No. 27 and the singles "How Good is Your Game", "I Trust You", and "Let 'Em In" reaching Nos. 50, 79, and 91 respectively. Paul's version of the Elton John hit "Your Song" cracked the top 40 in the U.K., reaching No. 38.

===== Final PIR recordings =====
Paul released Only the Strong Survive in 1977 and it proved to be his final charting album, reaching No. 152 on the Pop chart and No. 36 Soul. The LP's title track was the first single, reaching No. 68 on the Soul chart and No. 33 in the UK. The next time Paul's voice would be heard during the summer of 1977 was on the track "Let's Clean Up the Ghetto", featuring the "Philadelphia International All-Stars": Billy Paul, Lou Rawls, Archie Bell, Teddy Pendergrass, Dee Dee Sharp Gamble, and Eddie Levert and Walter Williams of The O'Jays. The song reached No. 91 on the Pop chart and No. 4 on the Soul chart. The Let's Clean Up the Ghetto album also included the Billy Paul tracks (both written by Gamble & Huff) "New Day" and "New World Comin'". All proceeds from the album and single went toward a program to benefit inner-cities throughout the U.S. Paul followed up the success of both his "Only the Strong Survive" single and "Let's Clean Up the Ghetto" with "Sooner or Later" – another track from his latest LP. Yet the track failed to chart as did "Don't Give Up on Us" and "Everybody's Breaking Up", which was officially released in the U.K. but only issued to radio in the U.S.

Paul's final studio album for Philadelphia International was First Class, released in 1979. It was the first album since his 1968 debut Feelin' Good at the Cadillac Club that did not make either the Pop or Soul charts. The LP's first single "Bring the Family Back" failed to chart but a 12" disco version did reach No. 90 on the Soul chart and No. 51 on the Dance chart. "False Faces" was also released in both single and 12" disco versions but neither charted.

Paul's run at Philadelphia International officially ended with the 1980 release Best of Billy Paul. This double-album compilation included four previously unreleased tracks: "You're My Sweetness", "Next to Nature", "What Are We Going to Do Now That He's Back", and "My Old Flame". The UK version was a single LP titled Billy Paul's Greatest Hits with a different track listing and only one of the "new" songs: "You're My Sweetness". That song was released as a single and reached No. 69 on the Soul chart. Paul's final single for Philadelphia International was an edited version of a song from his first Philadelphia International album Going East: "Jesus Boy (You Only Look Like a Man)", which failed to chart.

Numerous "best of" compilations of Paul's Philadelphia International work have been released over the years, though critics have made plain that most have failed to capture the right balance of singles and album tracks to fully represent the depth and breadth of his PIR output. For example, AllMusic's Andrew Hamilton said of the 2002 collection Super Hits: "If you didn't live and die with Billy Paul's albums when he cranked them out on Philadelphia International Records, you won't have a clue as to what his fans want to hear. To compile a CD from Paul's singles is to compile a mediocre collection; you have to supplement the singles with choice LP cuts. And with a brief ten-track collection like this, some of the singles should have been replaced with a few of Paul's icy album joints." By contrast, Jason Ankeny said that the 1999 compilation Me & Mrs. Jones: Best of Billy Paul "goes far beyond the classic title track in restoring the singer to prominence, showcasing his versatility via superb covers of pop favorites.... [and] the inclusion of R&B chart hits.... it all adds up to a definitive portrait of Paul in his prime."

Paul was on the Philadelphia International label, in all, for nine years and while he enjoyed considerable success – especially with "Me and Mrs. Jones" – critics generally agree that he deserved better. Andrew Hamilton put it bluntly: "Gamble and Huff did a horrible job picking Paul's singles. Some better choices, and his career might have been Hall-of-Famish." Similarly, Jason Ankeny wrote: "Too easily dismissed as little more than a one-hit wonder, Billy Paul was, in fact, one of the most gifted and affecting talents to grace the Philadelphia International stable – the recipient of some of the Gamble and Huff team's most lush and sophisticated productions. His deeply soulful voice bridged the gap between jazz and soul, textured in equal measure by street-smart swagger and touching vulnerability."

=== Post-PIR studio recordings ===
Paul made two studio albums in the 1980s. The first, Lately, was released in 1985 and was a dramatic musical departure from the lush Philadelphia Soul of his previous efforts. Recorded for Lonnie Simmons' Total Experience Records, the album's synthesizer and keyboard-driven tracks (typical of music production at the time) were closer to Simmons' work with the Gap Band and Yarbrough and Peoples than they were to Paul's '70s orchestrated wall of sound. The album's title track, a ballad, was released as a single in the U.K. but did not chart. The follow-up single – a slow jam called "Sexual Therapy" – fared better, climbing to No. 80 on the U.K. charts.

Paul's final studio album was 1988's Wide Open for the Ichiban label. Similar in production style to his previous release, though perhaps a bit smoother, it reached No. 61 on the Soul chart. However, the singles "We Could Have Been" and "I Just Love You So Much" failed to chart.

=== "Retirement" years ===
Paul announced his retirement in 1989 on stage in London. But like so many artists before him, he could not resist the temptation to continue to play live shows and record. In 2009 he was asked how he was enjoying his retirement in South Jersey: "Retired? Are you serious?"

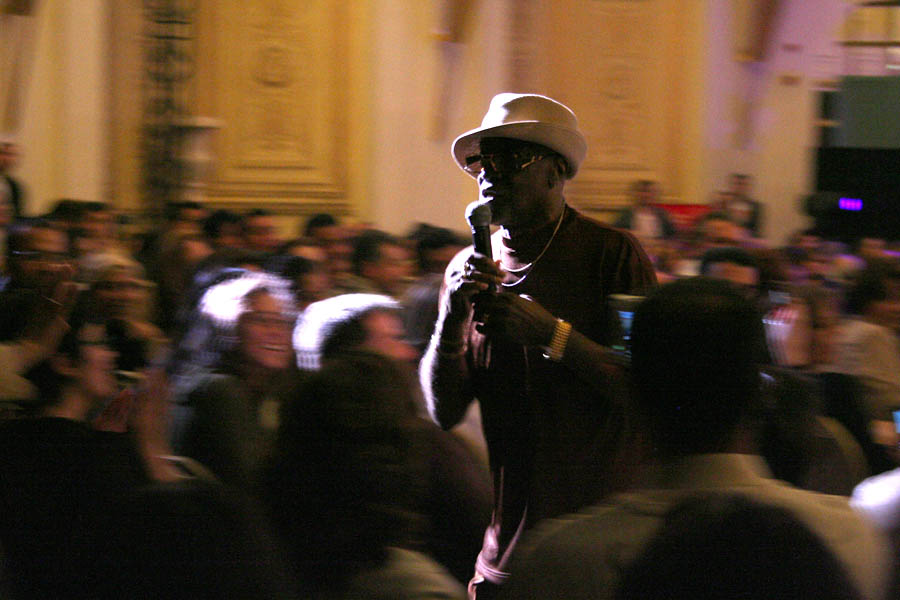
Billy Paul regularly played live around the world including this 2006 concert at the Carthage Palace Hotel in Tunis, Tunisia.

Post-"retirement", Paul regularly toured in the U.S. and abroad playing small clubs, hotel ballrooms, Las Vegas showrooms, Jazz festivals, and theaters. Asked in 2012 whether playing in Philadelphia held special meaning to him, he said: "I try to feel comfortable wherever I play, but they call it being a native son and I do get a lot of respect there so it is special. The reaction internationally is great as well, so even in Paris or Brazil we have great audiences. Songs like Mrs. Jones are huge everywhere so I do perform a lot overseas."

In 2000 he released a CD – Live World Tour 1999–2000 – on his own label, PhillySounds. Recorded in São Paulo, Brazil; Paris, France; Bermuda, and Philadelphia, it contained the following tracks: "Billy's Back Home", "Love Buddies", "When Love is New", "This is Your Life", "Thanks for Saving My Life", "Let's Get It On/What's Going On", "War of the Gods", "I Believe I Can Fly", "Your Song", "Without You", and "Mr & Mrs. Jones". Two years later, a complete show from that tour was released outside the U.S. on the PID label. Titled Your Songs: Live in Paris, it was recorded in December 2000 at a private event for the RFM TV Channel at Studio 287 in Paris, France. It includes the songs "July, July, July, July", "Only the Strong Survive", "It's Too Late", "Brown Baby", "Let 'Em In", "It's Critical", "False Faces", and "Let's Clean Up the Ghetto", among others.

I've always worked hard to create my own style. Nobody sounds like me. I've heard them call me 'legendary.' That feels pretty good ... though the word is overused these days.

— Billy Paul, 2009

As these live albums illustrate, Paul's concert set lists were varied, containing both his own songs as well as cover versions of jazz, soul, rock, and pop tunes. For example, his September 16, 2001, Sunday afternoon show at Gloria's Seafood in Philadelphia featured "Billy Boy", "Billy's Back Home", "Just in Time", "Old Folks", "Sleeping Bee", "Ebony Woman", "Thanks for Saving My Life", "Love Buddies", "April in Paris/I Love Paris", and "Me and Mrs. Jones".

His show of June 12, 2011, in São Paulo, Brazil consisted of "Thanks for Saving My Life", "I Will Survive" (performed by backing vocalist Anna Jordan), "Hello", "Purple Rain", "Smile", "Mrs. Robinson", "Your Song", "Me and Mrs. Jones", and "You Are So Beautiful".

On September 2nd, 2012, Billy Paul performed for a crowd of some twenty-five thousand fans in a free concert at Rio de Janeiro's Madureira Park, which had been inaugurated during the Rio+20 conference weeks before.

=== "Me and Mrs. Jones" lawsuits ===
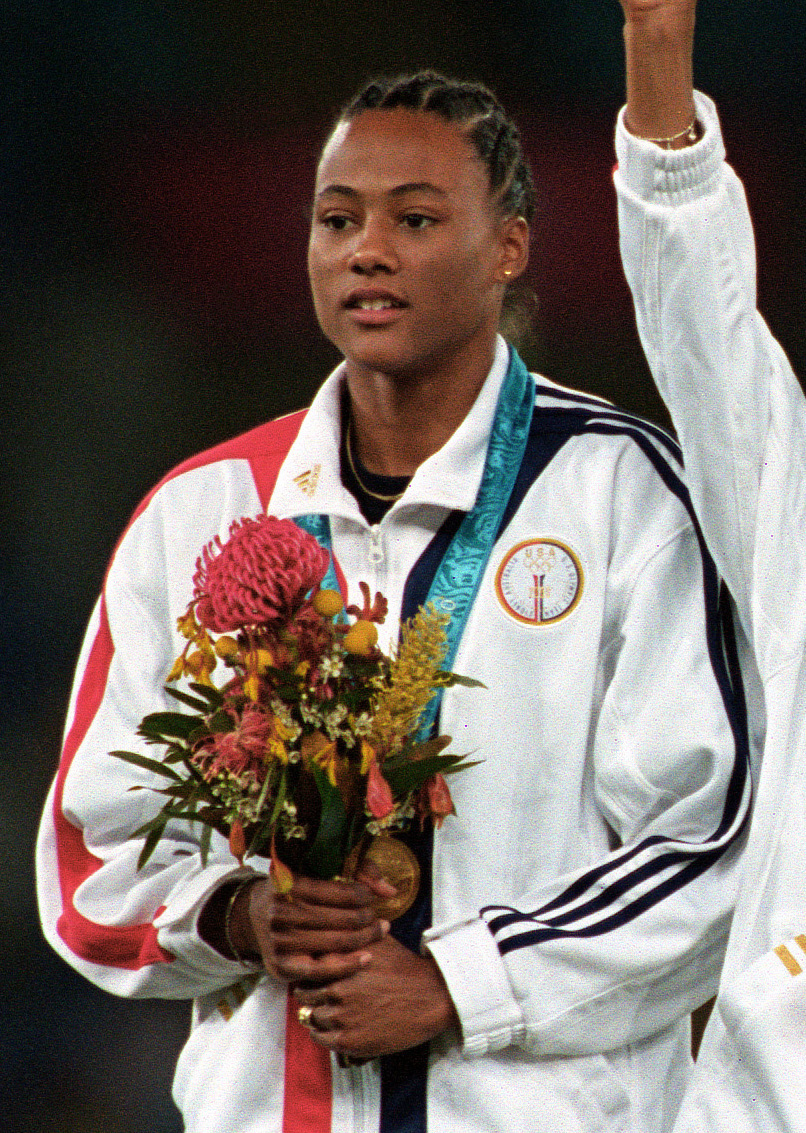
Olympic athlete Marion Jones was featured in the Nike television commercial that used Billy Paul's "Me and Mrs. Jones" song without his consent.

In 2000, Nike began airing a commercial featuring track and field star Marion Jones – the face of Team USA for the 2000 Summer Olympics, winning five medals, which were all later stripped from her for cheating. The campaign, entitled "Mrs. Jones", depicted the athlete as a half-hidden DJ talking about issues such as education and better pay for female athletes. The ad also featured Paul's studio recording of "Me and Mrs. Jones". Paul saw the commercial and contacted an attorney, who filed suit in a federal district court in Los Angeles against both the sportswear company and its advertising agency, Wieden & Kennedy. Paul sought $1 million in lost licensing fees, arguing that the company had cheated him by not obtaining his permission to use the song. A spokesperson for the ad agency called the decision to air the song without permission "a very stupid mistake".

On the heels of the Nike suit, Paul targeted his former record company for unpaid royalties on his signature song. He claimed that he had not received an accounting statement from Philadelphia International Records in 27 years and sued Assorted Music, its owners Kenny Gamble and Leon Huff, and Sony Music Entertainment for nearly half a million dollars. At the 2003 trial in a federal district court in Los Angeles, Joseph E. Porter, the attorney for Assorted Music, argued that Paul was only owed about $27,000, explaining that while the company had mistakenly failed to collect proper foreign royalties on the record, Paul actually owed the company about $314,000 for the costs of recording and producing the 10 albums he made for Philadelphia International from 1971 to 1980.

In the end, the jury deliberated for less than an hour and found that Paul did not owe the company anything. Instead, they awarded him half a million dollars in unpaid royalties for his recording of "Me and Mrs. Jones". Paul said through a statement issued by his attorney: "I'm so glad my path to justice has finally come to an end. I've been waiting years to be paid for my recordings." Seymour Straus, who testified at trial on Paul's behalf commented: "There is no question that Billy Paul's royalties had been improperly calculated for many years." Jay Berger of the Artists Rights Enforcement Corporation said: "This case firmly establishes the rights of singers signed to small production companies to receive 50% of the money earned by the major labels that distribute the records." Chuck Rubin the president of Artists Rights said: "The producers will no longer walk off with any of the artist's royalties." Paul's lawyer Steven Ames Brown commented: "It was a stunning victory for Billy. The jury awarded him $12,000 more than we requested. The years of deception and excuses are over and Billy Paul will from now on enjoy the fruits of his talents. Los Angeles juries have no patience for deadbeat record companies." Brown added: "And Billy Paul was Kenny Gamble's best friend. Can you imagine what might have happened to the others?"

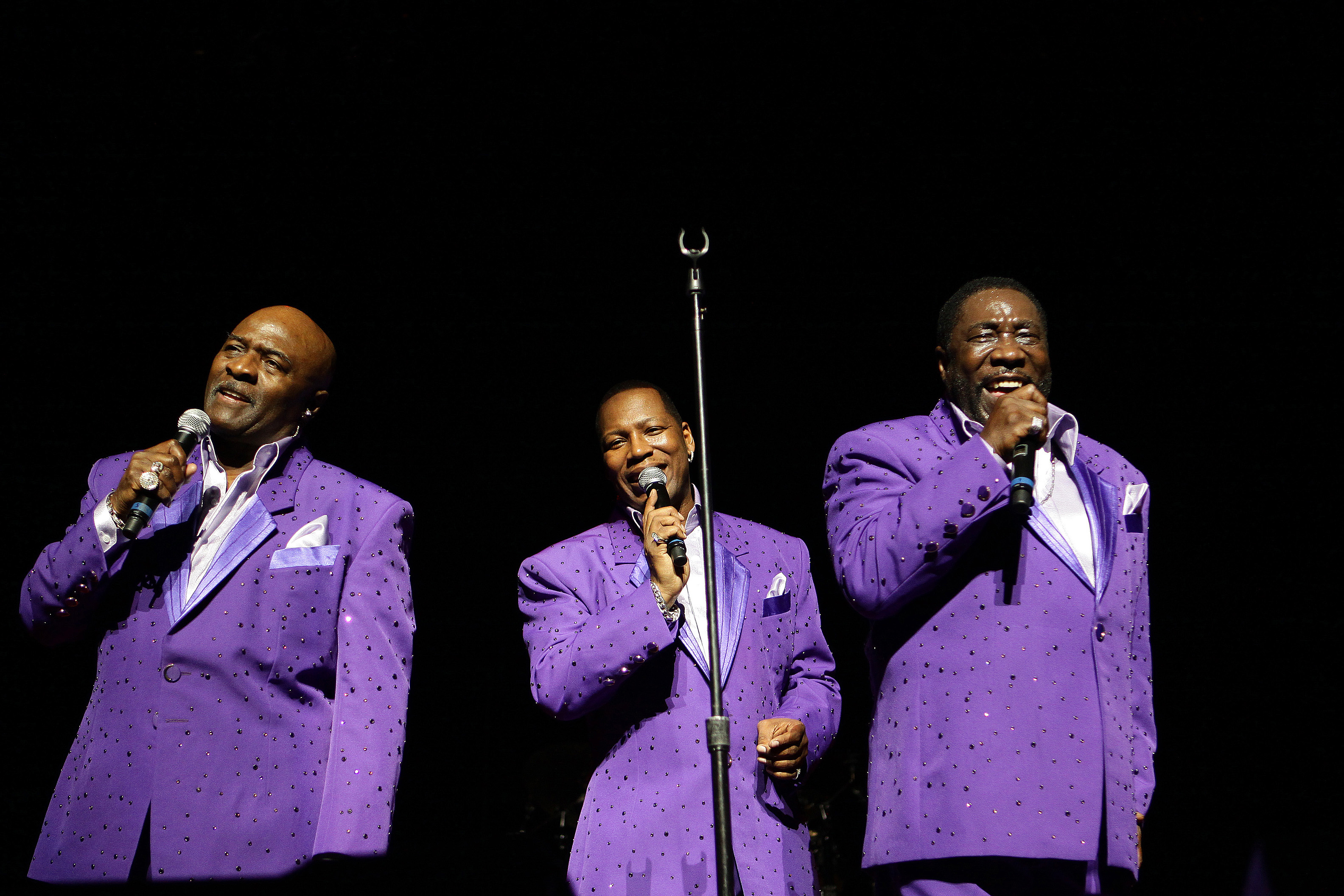
The O'Jays were among the artists who benefited from the precedent set by Billy Paul's lawsuit for unpaid royalties.

Paul's wife and manager Blanche Williams called the decision a "moral victory" and had especially harsh words for Kenny Gamble and Leon Huff: "The jury was...pissed off at the arrogance of G&H, the 'creative bookkeeping' done by Sony, and at discovering how blatantly and systematically Sony and PIR under-reported Billy's earnings.... In addition G&H will have to pay us interest on that money going back to '94 (statute of limitations). Oh yes, 'the chickens came home to roost.' Winning this case opens the door for all of those other artists whose royalties were withheld or under-accounted to go to court and seek justice, and to know that they have a good chance of winning their case. This is just the beginning of G&H's worst nightmare. The avalanche cometh."

Gamble & Huff's attorney Porter said after the verdict: "It was nothing but an accounting (issue). No one said 'you cheated me.'" Still, Paul's case was an important precedent for other artists including Archie Bell of Archie Bell & the Drells and the O'Jays who also sued Gamble & Huff for unpaid royalties.

==== Feature film ====
In 2009, the biographical feature film Am I Black Enough for You?, directed by Swedish director Göran Hugo Olsson, was released. Awarding the film three stars, Uncut magazine said "Olsson modelled his film on Let's Get Lost, Bruce Weber's 1989 portrait of Chet Baker, saying: "Paul is certainly no fallen demi-genius to set alongside Baker, but he proves an engaging, articulate subject, with a story that stretches back to playing alongside Charlie Parker, and peppered with the usual racial prejudice. His career is, in its way, emblematic of black America's struggles over the last half century, including a descent into cocaine addiction and recovery, both shared with his wife, who remains a quirky, willful presence throughout the movie. The pair come across as a jazzy Derby and Joan."

Paul explained why he had agreed to work with the filmmakers: "Well I'm not getting any younger and I wanted to express some things that might have been hidden. I wanted to release my heart and tell people about my highs and lows and I think you get that from this documentary.... It wasn't difficult to make. We were followed all over the world by this film crew from Europe and I got to be very good friends with the filmmakers. I would say things and do things as if the camera wasn't even there. They approached me about doing this film, and they are real fans. "Am I Black Enough for You?" is very popular in Sweden and these guys really knew their music. They were serious about it, they flew over and followed me and it got real personal...and I trusted them. It's very important like the relationship I have with my wife is based on trust. I wish everyone could have that level in their lives.... I am now at peace with myself, I think this movie has done a lot for me because it's helped me get rid of a lot of demons.

==== Later activity ====
In 2011, Paul participated in an album by French singer Chimène Badi, recording a duet with her on the Motown song "Ain't No Mountain High Enough".

To mark the 40th anniversary of Philadelphia International Records, in 2011 Big Break Records in the UK began remastering and reissuing many of the albums released on PIR, including Paul's works. They included new liner notes, interviews, and bonus tracks. In the U.S., Legacy Recordings issued Golden Gate Groove: The Sound of Philadelphia Live in San Francisco 1973 – a record company event recorded on June 27, 1973, at the Fairmont Hotel. Paul and other PIR acts were backed by MFSB which featured 35 musicians including Leon Huff on organ. Paul's performances of "East" (10:21) and "Me and Mrs. Jones" (8:34) appear on the album. AllMusic's Andy Kellman gave the release 4.5 out of 5 stars.

=== Awards and honors ===
In addition to receiving the Grammy for "Me and Mrs. Jones", Paul won several Ebby awards given by the readers of Ebony magazine; was a recipient of an American Music Award, the NAACP Image Award and numerous proclamations and keys to cities across the United States.

In 2010 Questlove of the Roots equated Paul with Marvin Gaye and Stevie Wonder, calling him "one of the criminally unmentioned proprietors of socially conscious post-revolution '60s civil rights music."

On April 27, 2026, Paul was inducted into the Atlantic City Walk of Fame at Brighton Park and presented by, The National R&B Music Society. On-air Radio personality Maurice "The Voice" Watts inducted Paul. Tavares, Sister Sledge, Melba Moore, Roy Ayers and Black Ivory were also inducted as part of the 2026 Class.

== Death ==
Paul died on the afternoon of April 24, 2016, at his home in the Blackwood section of Gloucester Township, New Jersey, from pancreatic cancer at the age of 81. He was buried at the West Laurel Cemetery in Bala Cynwyd, Pennsylvania, near labelmate Teddy Pendergrass, who died in 2010.

== Discography ==
=== Albums ===
Year	Album	Label	Peak chart positions	
Year	Album	Label	US	US R&B
1968	Feelin' Good at the Cadillac Club	Gamble SG 5002	—	—
1970	Ebony Woman	Neptune NLPS 201	183	12
1971	Going East	Philadelphia International KZ 30580	197	42
1972	360 Degrees of Billy Paul	Philadelphia International KZ 31793	17	1
1973	War of the Gods	Philadelphia International KZ 32409	110	12
1975	Got My Head on Straight	Philadelphia International KZ 33157	140	20
1975	When Love is New	Philadelphia International KZ 33843	139	17
1976	Let 'em In	Philadelphia International KZ 34389	88	27
1977	Only the Strong Survive	Philadelphia International KZ 34923	152	36
1979	First Class	Philadelphia International KZ 35756	—	—
1979	Best of Billy Paul	Philadelphia International Z 2-36314	205	58
1985	Lately	Total Experience TEL8-5711	—	—
1988	Wide Open	Ichiban ICH 1025	—	61
"—" denotes releases that did not chart or were not released in that territory.

=== Singles ===
Year	Label	Single (A-side / B-side)	Peak chart positions				Certifications
Year	Label	Single (A-side / B-side)	US	US R&B	AUS	UK	Certifications
1952	Jubilee 5081	"Why am I" / "That's Why I Dream"	—	—	—	—	
1952	Jubilee 5086	"You Didn't Know" / "The Stars are Mine"	—	—	—	—	
1959	New Dawn 1001	"Ebony Woman" / "You'll Go to Hell"	—	—	—	—	
1960	Finch 1005	"There's a Small Hotel" / "I'm Always a Brother"	—	—	—	—	
1969	Gamble 232	"Bluesette" / "Somewhere"	—	—	—	—	
1970	Neptune 30	"Let's Fall in Love All Over" / "Mrs. Robinson"	—	—	—	—	
1971	Philadelphia International 3509	"Magic Carpet Ride" / "Love Buddies"	—	—	—	—	
1972	Epic 1313	"Brown Baby" / "It's Too Late" (UK only)	—	—	—	—	
1972	Philadelphia International 3515	"This is Your Life" / "I Wish It Were Yesterday"	—	—	—	—	
1972	Philadelphia International 3521	"Me and Mrs. Jones" / "Your Song"	1	1	9	12	BPI: Silver
1973	Philadelphia International 3526	"Am I Black Enough for You?" / "I'm Gonna Make It This Time"	79	29	—	—	
1973	Philadelphia International 3538	"Thanks for Saving My Life" / "I Was Married"	37	9	—	33	
1974	Philadelphia International 3551	"Be Truthful to Me" / "I Wish It Were Yesterday"	—	37	—	—	
1974	Philadelphia International 2225	"The Whole Town's Talking" / "I Was Married" (UK only)	—	—	—	—	
1975	Philadelphia International 3563	"Billy's Back Home" / "I've Got So Much to Live For"	—	52	—	—	
1975	Philadelphia International 3572	"July July July July" / "When It's Your Time to Go"	—	—	—	—	
1976	Philadelphia International 3584	"Let's Make a Baby" / My Head's on Straight"	83	18	—	30	
1976	Philadelphia International 3593	"People Power" / "I Want Cha Baby"	—	82	—	—	
1977	Philadelphia International 3613	"How Good is Your Game" / "I Think I'll Stay Home Today"	—	50	—	—	
1977	Philadelphia International 3621	"Let 'em In" / "We All Got a Mission"	—	91	—	26	
1977	Philadelphia International 3630	"I Trust You" / "Love Won't Come Easy"	—	79	—	—	
1977	Philadelphia International 5038	"Without You" / "Word Sure Gets Around" (Italy only)	—	—	—	—	
1977	Philadelphia International 5391	"Your Song" / "How Good is Your Game" (UK only)	—	—	—	37	
1977	Philadelphia International 3635	"Only the Strong Survive" / "Where I Belong"	—	68	—	33	
1977	Philadelphia International 3636	"Let's Clean Up the Ghetto" / "Let's Clean Up the Ghetto"	91	4	—	—	
1978	Philadelphia International 3639	"Sooner or Later" / "Everybody's Breaking Up"	—	—	—	—	
1978	Philadelphia International 5983	"Everybody's Breaking Up" / "One Man's Junk" (UK only)	—	—	—	—	
1978	Philadelphia International 3645	"Don't Give Up on Us" / "One Man's Junk"	—	—	—	—	
1979	Philadelphia International 3676	"Bring the Family Back" / "It's Critical"	—	90	—	51	
1979	Philadelphia International 3699	"False Faces" / "I Gotta Put This Life Down"	—	—	—	—	
1980	Philadelphia International 3736	"You're My Sweetness" / "Me and Mrs. Jones"	—	69	—	—	
1980	Philadelphia International 3737	"Jesus Boy (You Only Look Like a Man)" / "Love Buddies"	—	—	—	—	
1985	Total Experience 49899	"Lately" / "I Search No More" (UK only)	—	—	—	—	
1985	Total Experience 49934	"Sexual Therapy" / "I Only Have Eyes for You" (UK only)	—	—	—	80	
1988	Ichiban 88–141	"We Could Have Been" / "I'd Rather be Alone"	—	—	—	—	
1988	Ichiban 88–150	"I Just Love You So Much" / "This May be Love"	—	—	—	—	
2011		"Me and Mrs. Jones"	—	—	—	177	
"—" denotes releases that did not chart or were not released in that territory.

== Filmography ==
- 2009, Am I Black Enough for You? (Cert 12A), director: Göran Hugo Olsson

== See also ==
- List of 1970s one-hit wonders in the United States
