= Neptune Records =

- Founded: 1969
- Country of origin: United States

Neptune Records was a record label founded by Philadelphia writer-producers, Kenny Gamble and Leon Huff in 1969.

The label, distributed by Chess Records, lasted for only two years, releasing 20 singles and three albums. It was the precursor to the pair's Philadelphia International label, which they started in 1971 with Columbia Records. Neptune featured releases by artists such as Jeanette "Baby" Washington, The O'Jays, The Three Degrees and Billy Paul, all who later appeared on Philadelphia International. The biggest hit was the label's first release, "One Night Affair" by the O'Jays (#15, R&B).

== See also ==
- List of record labels
