= Me and Mrs. Jones =

1972 song recorded by Billy Paul

Single by Billy Paul

from the album 360 Degrees of Billy Paul
- B-side: "Your Song"
- Released: September 13, 1972
- Recorded: 1972
- Studio: Sigma Sound, Philadelphia, Pennsylvania
- Genre: Philadelphia soul
- Length: 4:45
- Label: Philadelphia International
- Songwriters: Kenny Gamble, Leon Huff, Cary Gilbert
- Producers: Kenny Gamble, Leon Huff

Billy Paul singles chronology
"This Is Your Life" (1972)	"Me and Mrs. Jones" (1972)	"Am I Black Enough for You?" (1973)

Audio
- "Billy Paul - Me and Mrs. Jones (Official Audio)" on YouTube

"Me and Mrs. Jones" is a 1972 soul song written by Kenny Gamble, Leon Huff, and Cary Gilbert, and originally recorded by Billy Paul. It describes an extramarital affair between a man and his lover, Mrs. Jones. In the song, the two meet in secret "every day at the same cafe", at 6:30, where they hold hands and talk. The two are caught in a quandary: "We got a thing going on/we both know that it's wrong/but it's much too strong/to let it go now."

== Billy Paul original ==
"Me and Mrs. Jones" was a #1 single originally performed by Billy Paul, recorded and released in 1972 on CBS Records' Philadelphia International imprint. The single, included on the album 360 Degrees of Billy Paul, was written by Cary 'Hippy' Gilbert, Kenny Gamble, and Leon Huff, and arranged by Bobby Martin.

The single became Paul's only #1 single on the U.S. Billboard Hot 100, holding that position for three weeks in December 1972. "Me and Mrs. Jones" also achieved this feat on Billboard's R&B Singles chart, remaining at the top for four weeks. On the Hot 100, it replaced "I Am Woman" by Helen Reddy and was replaced by Carly Simon's "You're So Vain". It also hit #10 on the Adult Contemporary chart. For two weeks - February 3-10, 1973 - it peaked at number 12 on the UK Singles Chart. Paul won Best R&B Vocal Performance, Male at the 15th Grammy Awards. In 2018, Paul's single was inducted into the Grammy Hall of Fame.

The radio edit versions were shorter, omitting the second verse, as well as shortening the coda. The video for this song features Paul playing piano in a recording session, with an unlit green cigar, accompanied by dancers.

The saxophone quotes the first seven notes of the Doris Day song "Secret Love", heard in the intro and outro of the song. Both Sammy Fain and Paul Francis Webster sued Cary Gilbert plus Gamble and Huff for quoting the song without written approval beforehand. Both Fain and Webster won the damages in a lawsuit, with half of the song's proceeds going to Fain and Webster.

In 2009, Essence magazine included the song in their list of the "25 Best Slow Jams of All Time".

Reviewing the song for Stereogum in 2019, Tom Breihan said: "It’s a finely observed song, one that never judges its characters or imagines a way out of its situation. But it’s also schmaltz. One of Gamble and Huff’s great strengths was their sense of rhythmic push; it’s what would make them so ideally suited for the early days of disco. But we don’t hear that on "Me And Mrs. Jones". Instead, it's a lush and lazy sprawl of a song. It all sounds magnificent, these guitars and pianos and saxophones all luxuriating into each other. But there's no force to it, no urgency." In his obituary for Paul in The New York Times William Grimes said: "The arrangement has been described as having "A lush string arrangement and punchy horn parts complemented Mr. Paul’s velvety, husky baritone, which built from a near-whisper at the beginning of the song to a wrenching, drawn-out shout of “Me and Mrs. Jones” at climactic points.

== Charts ==
=== Weekly charts ===
Chart (1972–1973)	Peak position
Argentina (Record World)	9
Australia (Kent Music Report)	9
Canada Top Singles (RPM)	14
New Zealand (Listener)	5
UK (OCC)	12
US Billboard Hot 100	1
US R&B (Billboard)	1
US Adult Contemporary (Billboard)	10
US Cash Box Top 100	1

=== Year-end charts ===
Chart (1973)	Rank
Australia (Kent Music Report)	82
US Billboard Hot 100	15
US Cash Box Top 100	9

=== All-time charts ===
Chart (1958–2018)	Position
US Billboard Hot 100	475

== Certifications ==
Region	Certification	Certified units/sales
United Kingdom (BPI)	Silver	200,000^{‡}
United States (RIAA)	Gold	1,000,000^{^}
^{^} Shipments figures based on certification alone.^{‡} Sales+streaming figures based on certification alone.

== Freddie Jackson version ==
"Me and Mrs. Jones"

Single by Freddie Jackson

from the album Time for Love
- B-side: "I Could Use a Little Love (Right Now)"
- Released: November 1992
- Recorded: 1991
- Genre: R&B; soul
- Length: 5:24
- Label: Capitol
- Songwriters: Kenny Gamble, Leon Huff, Cary Gilbert
- Producer: Kenny Hairston

Freddie Jackson singles chronology
"Can I Touch You" (1992)	"Me and Mrs. Jones" (1992)	"Make Love Easy" (1993)

Music video
- "Freddie Jackson - Me and Mrs. Jones (Official Music Video)" on YouTube

Twenty years later after Paul's original became a number-one R&B and pop hit, American singer Freddie Jackson recorded a rendition of the song for his 1992 album Time for Love. The track was produced and arranged by Kenni Hairston, and released as the third single from the album. Jackson's cover was a top-forty hit and peaked at no. 32 on both the Billboard Hot R&B Singles chart and UK Singles chart.

=== Track listings ===
- US Cassette single

A1. "Me and Mrs. Jones" (Edit) – 4:00
A2. "Me and Mrs. Jones" (LP Version) – 5:23
B1. "Me and Mrs. Jones" (Edit) – 4:00
B2. "Me and Mrs. Jones" (LP Version) – 5:23

- UK CD Maxi-Single
1. "Me and Mrs. Jones" (Single Edit) – 4:10
2. "Me and Mrs. Jones" (LP Version) – 5:25
3. "I Could Use a Little Love (Right Now)" (Extended Mix) – 6:26
- UK 7" vinyl single

A. "Me and Mrs. Jones" (Edit) – 4:00
B. "Me and Mrs. Jones" (LP Version) – 5:23

=== Charts ===
Chart (1993)	Peak position
UK Singles Chart	32
US Hot R&B/Hip-Hop Songs (Billboard)	32

== Michael Bublé version ==
"Me and Mrs. Jones"

Single by Michael Bublé featuring Emily Blunt

from the album Call Me Irresponsible
- Released: September 3, 2007
- Recorded: 2007
- Genre: Big band
- Length: 4:33 (album version)
- Label: 143, Reprise
- Songwriters: Kenny Gamble, Leon Huff, Cary Gilbert

Michael Bublé featuring Emily Blunt singles chronology
"Everything" (2007)	"Me and Mrs. Jones" (2007)	"Lost" (2007)

Music video
- "Michael Bublé - Me and Mrs. Jones (Official Music Video) [HD Remaster]" on YouTube

"Me and Mrs. Jones" was recorded in 2007 by Canadian crooner Michael Bublé and released as the second single from his third studio album, Call Me Irresponsible. The song is a collaboration with Bublé's then-girlfriend, Emily Blunt, who appears at the end of the track to perform the final verse.

=== Background ===
Bublé's version of "Me and Mrs. Jones" was well received by critics, with Okayplayer stating; "he skillfully portrays the pain of this song’s affair and his take on the final verse could stand with anyone else’s." The single was also promoted by its performance during Bublé's AOL Sessions performances. The track has also been performed at many of his concerts. Due to his break-up with then-girlfriend Emily Blunt shortly before the release of the single, the release was cancelled, the physical single pulled, and little or no promotion for the song was undertaken. Thus, "Me and Mrs. Jones" was not eligible to chart in any major music charts; however, it did chart in Switzerland due to strong downloads from the album.

A short promotional music video was first broadcast on French television during April 2007. The clip alternates between scenes of Bublé performing by the window, in the dark, as it rains, used in the official music video, and scenes of a blonde woman during a day at the beach, horseback riding and watching the sunset as the clip ends. The official music video was first broadcast during July 2007. It consists mainly of scenes of Bublé standing, performing by the window, as in the French promotional clip. Some scenes show a brunette woman, representing "Mrs. Jones". Some shots from the promotional video of "Lost" were also used, particularly the ones where Bublé is sitting on a white bed. The video was directed by Sean Turrell.

=== Track listings ===
- UK CD single #1 (Withdrawn)
1. "Me and Mrs. Jones" (Album Version) - 4:33
2. "It's All in the Game" - 2:36
- UK CD single #2 (Withdrawn)
1. "Me and Mrs. Jones" (Album Version) - 4:33
2. "Dream a Little Dream" - 3:08
3. "Me and Mrs. Jones" (Live Version) - 4:48

=== Charts ===
Chart (2007)	Peak position
Swiss Music Charts	68

== Other notable versions ==
- Monk Montgomery, jazz bassist, recorded the song for his 1974 album Reality.
- A recording by the 1970s group the Dramatics peaked at No. 47 on the pop chart, No. 4 on the R&B chart in 1974, and No. 78 in Canada.
- The song was also recorded by Taufik Batisah on his debut album in 2004.
- Daryl Hall & John Oates recorded a live version for their 2003 album Live in Concert.

== In film and television ==
- Robson Green sings the song over the opening credits of the Granada TV movie Me and Mrs Jones (2002), starring himself and Caroline Goodall. His cover was panned in The Independent, where Charlotte O'Sullivan described it as "simply a crime to do this to the song."
- The Stylistics' version was used in the film Bridget Jones's Diary, in the scene where Bridget's mother begins an extramarital affair, but was not included on the soundtrack release.
- The song was used in the film Beautiful Girls and appears on its soundtrack.
- In the cold opening sketch of the Saturday Night Live 25th Anniversary Special in 1999, Bill Murray - in character as "Nick The Lounge Singer" - sang the chorus to Catherine Zeta-Jones as he walked through the audience acknowledging celebrities in attendance.
- In Scrubs, Turk learns & sings the song for Carla.

== See also ==
- List of number-one R&B hits (United States)
- R&B number-one hits of 1972 (USA)
- List of 1970s one-hit wonders in the United States
- Billy Paul: "Me and Mrs. Jones" lawsuits
