= Bobby Martin (producer) =

- Born: Robert L. Martin; May 4, 1930; Lockland, Ohio, U.S.
- Died: September 6, 2013 (aged 83) San Diego, California, U.S.
- Genres: Philadelphia soul, R&B, soul, pop
- Occupations: Record producer, arranger, songwriter
- Years active: 1951–2013
- Formerly of: Billy Paul, The O'Jays, The Three Degrees, MFSB, Harold Melvin & the Blue Notes, Lou Rawls

Bobby Martin (May 4, 1930 – September 6, 2013) was an American music producer, arranger and songwriter, closely associated with Philadelphia International Records and Philly soul. He is best known for his arrangement of Billy Paul's "Me and Mrs. Jones", his work on the Soul Train theme, and with artists including Whitney Houston, L.T.D., MFSB, Patti LaBelle, Nancy Wilson, Lou Rawls, Lesley Gore, The Manhattans, The O'Jays, The Jacksons, Dusty Springfield and the Bee Gees, among others.

Martin received a Grammy Award for Album of the Year for his contribution to the Saturday Night Fever soundtrack.

He died in 2013.
