= Teddy Pendergrass discography =

This is the discography of American R&B/soul singer Teddy Pendergrass.

== Albums ==
=== Studio albums ===
Year	Album	Peak chart positions				Certifications	Record label
Year	Album	US	US R&B	CAN	UK	Certifications	Record label
1977	Teddy Pendergrass	17	6	85	—	RIAA: Platinum	Philadelphia International
1978	Life Is a Song Worth Singing	11	1	27	—	RIAA: Platinum	Philadelphia International
1979	Teddy	5	1	—	—	RIAA: Platinum	Philadelphia International
1980	TP	14	3	—	—	RIAA: Platinum	Philadelphia International
1981	It's Time for Love	19	6	—	—	RIAA: Platinum	Philadelphia International
1982	This One's for You	59	6	—	—		Philadelphia International
1983	Heaven Only Knows	123	9	—	—		Philadelphia International
1984	Love Language	38	4	81	—	RIAA: Gold	Asylum
1985	Workin' It Back	96	6	—	—		Asylum
1988	Joy	54	2	63	45	RIAA: Gold	Elektra
1991	Truly Blessed	49	4	—	—		Elektra
1993	A Little More Magic	92	13	—	—		Elektra
1997	You and I	137	24	—	—		Surefire
1998	This Christmas (I'd Rather Have Love)	—	83	—	—		Surefire
"—" denotes a recording that did not chart or was not released in that territory.

=== Live albums ===
Year	Album	Peak chart positions		Certifications	Record label
Year	Album	US	US R&B	Certifications	Record label
1979	Live! Coast to Coast	33	5	RIAA: Gold	Philadelphia International
2002	From Teddy, With Love	—	63		Razor & Tie
"—" denotes a recording that did not chart or was not released in that territory.

=== Compilation albums ===
Year	Album	Peak chart positions			Record label
Year	Album	US	US R&B	UK	Record label
1981	Ready For…	—	—	—	Philadelphia International
1985	Greatest Hits	—	68	—	Philadelphia International
1998	The Best of Teddy Pendergrass	—	65	—	The Right Stuff
2001	Greatest Slow Jams	—	98	—	The Right Stuff
2003	Anthology	—	—	—	The Right Stuff
2004	The Love Songs Collection	—	70	—	Philadelphia International
2004	Bedroom Classics, Vol. 1	—	—	—	Elektra/Rhino
2004	Satisfaction Guaranteed: The Very Best of Teddy Pendergrass	—	—	26	WSM
2008	Essential Teddy Pendergrass	136	55	—	Philadelphia International
2009	Playlist: The Very Best of Teddy Pendergrass	173	34	—	Philadelphia International
2010	The Music of Teddy Pendergrass	—	—	—	Sony Music
2010	Super Hits	—	—	—	Sony Music
2011	S.O.U.L.	—	47	—	Sony Music
"—" denotes a recording that did not chart or was not released in that territory.

== Singles ==
Year	Single	Peak chart positions					Certifications	Album
Year	Single	US	US R&B	US Dan	CAN	UK	Certifications	Album
1977	"I Don't Love You Anymore"	41	5	7	72	—		Teddy Pendergrass
1977	"You Cant Hide from Yourself"	—	—	7	—	—		Teddy Pendergrass
1977	"The More I Get, the More I Want"	—	—	7	—	—		Teddy Pendergrass
1977	"The Whole Town's Laughing at Me"	102	16	—	—	44		Teddy Pendergrass
1978	"Close the Door"	25	1	—	70	41	RIAA: Gold	Life Is a Song Worth Singing
1978	"Only You"	106	22	29	—	41		Life Is a Song Worth Singing
1978	"Life Is a Song Worth Singing"	—	—	—	—	—		Life Is a Song Worth Singing
1979	"Turn Off the Lights"	48	2	—	—	—		Teddy
1979	"Come Go with Me"	—	14	—	—	—		Teddy
1979	"Shout and Scream"	—	21	—	—	—		Live! Coast to Coast
1980	"It's You I Love"	—	44	—	—	—		Live! Coast to Coast
1980	"Can't We Try"	52	3	52	—	—		TP
1980	"Love T.K.O."	44	2	—	—	—		TP
1981	"Two Hearts" (with Stephanie Mills)	40	3	—	—	49		Stephanie
1981	"I Can't Live Without Your Love"	103	10	—	—	—		It's Time for Love
1981	"You're My Latest, My Greatest Inspiration"	43	4	—	—	—		It's Time for Love
1982	"This Gift of Life" (A-side)	—	31	—	—	—		This One's for You
1982	"Nine Times Out of Ten" (B-side)	—	31	—	—	—		It's Time for Love
1982	"I Can't Win for Losing"	—	32	—	—	—		This One's for You
1984	"I Want My Baby Back"	—	61	—	—	—		Heaven Only Knows
1984	"Hold Me" (with Whitney Houston)	46	5	—	—	44		Love Language
1984	"You're My Choice Tonight (Choose Me)"	—	15	—	—	—		Love Language
1985	"Somewhere I Belong"	—	76	—	—	—		D.A.R.Y.L.
1985	"Never Felt Like Dancin'"	—	21	—	—	—		Workin' It Back
1986	"Love 4/2"	—	6	—	—	—		Workin' It Back
1986	"Let Me Be Closer"	—	67	—	—	—		Workin' It Back
1988	"Joy"	77	1	42	—	58		Joy
1988	"2 A.M."	—	3	—	—	—		Joy
1988	"Love Is the Power"	—	57	—	—	—		Joy
1990	"Glad to Be Alive" (with Lisa Fischer)	—	31	—	—	—		Truly Blessed
1990	"Make It with You"	—	23	—	—	—		Rubáiyát: Elektra's 40th Anniversary
1991	"It Should've Been You"	—	1	—	—	—		Truly Blessed
1991	"I Find Everything in You"	—	31	—	—	—		Truly Blessed
1993	"Voodoo"	—	25	—	—	—		A Little More Magic
1994	"Believe in Love"	105	14	—	—	—		A Little More Magic
1994	"I'm Always Thinking About You"	—	90	—	—	—		A Little More Magic
1994	"The More I Get, The More I Want" (with KWS)	—	—	—	—	35		—
1997	"Don't Keep Wastin' My Time"	90	39	—	—	—		You and I
1997	"Give It to Me"	105	57	—	—	—		You and I
"—" denotes a recording that did not chart or was not released in that territory.
