= Raw Silk =

American band

- Origin: New York City, U.S.
- Genres: Post-disco, boogie, R&B
- Years active: 1979–1983
- Labels: West End Records, Arista Records
- Past members: Jessica Cleaves; Tenita Jordan; Sybil Thomas; Valarie Pettiford

Raw Silk was an American dance group which originated in New York. The original lineup comprised Jessica Cleaves, Tenita Jordan, and Sybil Thomas. The group released a single called "Do It to the Music" on West End Records, which peaked in the Top 10 on the US Billboard Hot Dance/Disco Club Play chart.

== History ==
In 1982, Crown Heights Affair members Ron Dean Miller and Bert Reid formed a female group called Raw Silk, originally comprised Jessica Cleaves, Tenita Jordan, and Sybil Thomas. They were signed to West End Records, a popular garage label. In July 1982, Raw Silk released their debut single "Do It to the Music". The single became popular in clubs and pushed the song to number 5 on the US Billboard Hot Dance/Disco Club Play chart as well as to the Top 40 on the US Hot Black Singles chart. "Do It to the Music" also peaked in the Top 20 on the UK Singles chart, inviting the group to perform on Top of the Pops in October 1982.

Shortly after the release of the single, Sybil Thomas was unable to tour with the group. Valarie Pettiford, a singer who was performing in the Broadway production of Sophisticated Ladies, was added to the lineup for the duration of their tour. The new lineup debuted on British music show Top of the Pops with Pettiford lip-syncing to Thomas' lead vocals on "Do It to the Music" in October 1982. In an interview with British music newspaper Record Mirror from October 1982, the group confirmed that they were recording several songs for an album. In August 1983, the group released their second single "Just in Time". The single was commercially less successful than its predecessor, only peaking in the Top 40 of the US Billboard R&B chart and UK Singles chart. The group disbanded at the end of 1983 and no album was released.

== Disbandment and aftermath ==
Following the disbandment of the group in 1983, each member went to pursue solo careers in music and entertainment.

- Jessica Cleaves (December 10, 1948 – May 2, 2014) went on to work with Parliament-Funkadelic singer and musician George Clinton. She performed on his Family Series' albums Go Fer Yer Funk (1992), Plush Funk (1992), Testing Positive 4 the Funk (1993), and A Fifth of Funk (1993).
- Tenita Jordan (October 8, 1960 – September 23, 2018) pursued work as a session singer, eventually becoming a background singer for American singer Teddy Pendergrass. She performed background vocals for his albums Love Language (1984) and Workin' It Back (1985). In 1985, she signed to his recording label Top Priority Records. The following year, she released her debut album Tenita, which spawned the singles "I Don't Wanna Think About It", "You Got Me Dreamin'", and "Free Me". She continued her work as a session singer, working with Lenny Kravitz on his 5 album in 1998. In 1999, she contributed background vocals to Angie Stone's albums Black Diamond (1999) and Mahogany Soul (2001). From 2000 to 2005, she toured as a background singer for Angie Stone. Tenita Jordan died on September 23, 2018.
- Sybil Thomas also continued working as a session singer. Different record labels began hiring her to perform background vocals for their signed recording artists. Gramavision Records hired Thomas to perform on Jay Hoggard's album Love Survives and Oliver Lake's album Plug It, both released in 1983. Japan-based record label Apollon Music Industrial Corp. hired her to perform on Hiroshi Fukumura's Hot Shot and Barry Finnerty's Lights On Broadway album, both released in 1985. In March 2018, she released her debut solo album Breathe on Kultone Records. The album spawned the singles "Keep It Fired Up" and "So Fo Real".
- Valarie Pettiford (born July 8, 1960), who replaced Thomas during their tour in 1982, went to become a successful actress. Pettiford received a Tony nomination as Best Featured Actress in a Musical and a Dora Mavor Moore Award nomination for her role in the Broadway production Fosse from 1998 to 1999. She eventually starred in Deirdre "Big Dee Dee" LaFontaine Thorne on the UPN television sitcom Half & Half from 2002 to 2006.

== Discography ==
Year	Song	Label	Peak chart positions		
Year	Song	Label	US Dance	US R&B	UK
1982	"Do It to the Music"	West End	5	65	18
1983	"Just in Time"	West End	40	–	49
