= Tenita Jordan =

American singer-songwriter

- Tenita Jordan, circa 1982.

Background information
- Also known as: Tenita Dreher
- Born: Tenita Lavern Jordan; October 8, 1960; Monroe, North Carolina, U.S.
- Died: September 23, 2018 (aged 57)
- Genres: R&B; soul
- Occupations: Singer; songwriter; actress
- Years active: 1978–present
- Labels: Top Priority Records; CBS

Tenita Jordan-Dreher (October 8, 1960 – September 23, 2018) was an American singer, songwriter, and actress. In 1981, she portrayed one of the Stepp Sisters in the original Broadway musical production of Dreamgirls. She later formed a post disco group called Raw Silk. The group had a US Top 5 dance song called "Do It to the Music". In 1986, she released her solo album Tenita on Teddy Pendergrass' record label Top Priority Records.

== Early life ==
Tenita Lavern Jordan was born in Monroe, North Carolina, on October 8, 1960. Her mother, Ruth Jordan (née Threatt), was a military bookkeeper and taught business classes to military personnel, while her father, James Jordan, was a United States Army Staff Sergeant who served in the Korean War and Vietnam War. She attended CA Johnson High School where she graduated from in 1977. During her sophomore year of high school, she won the fifth annual Miss Black Teenage World pageant in 1975. She later attended Hampton University but left in 1978 to pursue a career on Broadway.

== Career ==
=== 1978–1982: Beginnings and Broadway ===
In June 1978, she debuted in the Broadway production of The Wiz, she portrayed one of the Munchkins and one of the Field Mice. In December 1979, she appeared as one of the performers in Eubie!. In December 1981, she appeared as one of the Stepp Sisters in the original production of Dreamgirls. She toured with the production until 1985. She also appeared on the Dreamgirls: Original Broadway Cast Album.

=== 1982–1983: Raw Silk ===
In 1982, Crown Heights Affair musicians Ron Dean Miller and Bert Reid formed a female group called Raw Silk. The group comprised Jordan, Jessica Cleaves, and Sybil Thomas. Raw Silk was signed to West End Records and debuted in late 1982 with the release of their single "Do It to the Music". The song peaked in the Top 40 on the US Billboard Hot Black Singles chart and number 5 on the Hot Dance/Disco Club Play chart. "Do It to the Music" also peaked in the Top 20 on the UK Singles chart, inviting the group to perform on Top of the Pops in October 1982.

In 1983, the group followed up with the release of their second single "Just in Time". While the song was commercially less successful than its predecessor, "Just in Time" peaked in the Top 40 on the US Dance chart and at number 49 on the UK Singles chart. The group disbanded shortly after the release of the single. In an interview with British music newspaper Record Mirror, the group had confirmed that they were recording several songs for an album but it was never released.

=== 1984–1988: Tenita and Top Priority Records ===
In 1984, Jordan began working with American singer Teddy Pendergrass. She sang background on his album Love Language (1984). Pendergrass, who was just forming his own record label Top Priority (subsidiary of CBS Records), eventually signed Jordan to his label and began managing her career. In 1986, Jordan released her debut solo album Tenita. The album's lead single, "I Don't Wanna Think About It", peaked at number 41 on US Dance chart and number 89 on the US Hot Black Singles chart. She followed up with the release of two more singles "You Got Me Dreamin'" and "Free Me". After Pendergrass left Asylum Records, his own record label became defunct, leaving Jordan without a record deal. Jordan continued to record with Pendergrass on his next album Joy (1988).

=== 1998–2005: Later career ===
After a hiatus, Jordan continued her work as a session singer. She worked with Lenny Kravitz on his 5 album in 1998. In 1999, she contributed background vocals to Angie Stone's albums Black Diamond (1999) and Mahogany Soul (2001). From 2000 to 2005, she toured as a background singer for Angie Stone. Tenita Jordan died on September 23, 2018.

== Personal life ==
In 1985, she married a technician named Christopher Nightingale. The couple had a daughter Jhena Ruth Nightengale in 1987.

== Discography ==
=== Albums ===
- Tenita (1986)

=== Singles ===
Year	Song	Peak chart positions		Album
Year	Song	US R&B	US Dance	Album
1985	"I Don't Wanna Think About It"	41	89	Tenita
1985	"You Got Me Dreamin'"	–	–	Tenita
1986	"Free Again"	–	–	Tenita
