= Joy (Teddy Pendergrass album) =

Studio album by Teddy Pendergrass
- Released: 1988
- Studios: QCA (Cincinnati, Ohio); Kajem/Victory and Sigma Alpha (Philadelphia, Pennsylvania); Cherokee (Hollywood, California); Larrabee (North Hollywood, California
- Genre: Soul
- Length: 45:18
- Label: Elektra
- Producers: Teddy Pendergrass, Miles Jaye, Nick Martinelli, Reggie Calloway, Vincent Calloway

Teddy Pendergrass chronology
Workin' It Back (1985)	Joy (1988)	Truly Blessed (1991)

Joy is a studio album by the American singer Teddy Pendergrass, released in 1988 on Elektra Records. It was nominated for a Grammy Award, in the "Best R&B Vocal Performance, Male" category.

Joy peaked at No. 54 on the Billboard 200 and No. 2 on the R&B chart, Pendergrass's highest placing on the chart since 1979's No. 1 album Teddy. It peaked at No. 45 on the UK Albums Chart.

== Production ==
The album was produced by Reggie and Vincent Calloway, Nick Martinelli, Miles Jaye, and Pendergrass. It was mostly recorded at Victory Studios, in Philadelphia.

== Critical reception ==
Professional ratings
Review scores
Source	Rating
AllMusic	3/5 stars
Los Angeles Times	3/4 stars
The Rolling Stone Album Guide	3/5 stars

The Chicago Tribune called the album "an accomplished meditation on romantic love and perhaps an exercise in imagination." The Washington Post praised the "dusky purr on slow-groove songs like '2 A.M.' and 'Love Is the Power'." The Los Angeles Times wrote that Pendergrass's "smoldering style has been replaced by a sleek, sophisticated sound that recalls the urbane elegance of Luther Vandross' best work."

== Track listing ==
1. "Joy" (Reggie Calloway, Vincent Calloway, Joel Davis) – 6:18
2. "2 A.M." (James S. Carter, Kevin J. Askins, Marvin Hammett) – 5:25
3. "Good to You" (Miles Jaye) – 5:13
4. "I'm Ready" (Jaye) – 5:12
5. "Love Is the Power" (R. Calloway, V. Calloway, Davis) – 6:16
6. "This Is the Last Time" (Gabriel Hardeman, Annette Hardeman) – 6:27
7. "Through the Falling Rain (Love Story)" (Carter, Askins, Hammett) – 4:58
8. "Can We Be Lovers" (Carter, Freddie Williams) – 5:29

== Personnel ==
Vocalists

- Teddy Pendergrass – lead vocals
- Annette Hardeman – backing vocals
- Charlene Hollaway – backing vocals, vocal solo (6)
- Cynthia Biggs – backing vocals (1, 5, 6)
- Elizabeth Hogue – backing vocals (2, 3, 7, 8)
- Tenita Jordan – backing vocals (4)
- Miles Jaye – backing vocals (8)

Musicians

- Joel Davis – keyboards (1, 5)
- Miles Jaye – synthesizers (2–4, 7, 8), bass guitar (2, 3, 7), rhythm tracks (2–4, 7), violin (2), percussion (8)
- Randy Cantor – synthesizers (6), strings (6)
- Donald Robinson – Rhodes electric piano (6), acoustic piano (6)
- John "Skip" Anderson – electric piano (8)
- Gene Robinson – guitars (1, 5)
- Jef Lee Johnson – guitars (2–4, 7)
- Randy Bowland – guitars (6)
- William "Doc" Powell – guitars (8)
- Doug Grigsby – bass (6)
- Tom Barney – bass guitar (8)
- Keith Robertson – tom drum programming (1, 5)
- Daryl Burgee – drums (6)
- J.T. Lewis – drums (8)
- Marc Russo – saxophones (1, 5)
- Bill Reichenbach Jr. – trombone (1, 5)
- Gary Grant – trumpet (1, 5)
- Jerry Hey – trumpet (1, 5), horn arrangements (1, 5)

Production

- Teddy Pendergrass – executive producer, producer (2, 7, 8)
- Reggie Calloway – producer (1, 5)
- Vince Calloway – producer (1, 5)
- Miles Jaye – producer (2–4, 7, 8)
- Mike Martinelli – producer (6)
- Carol Friedman – art direction, photography
- Henrietta Condak – design
- Lisa Silvestri – stylist
- Bomba De Clereq – clothing

Technical credits

- Greg Calbi – mastering at Sterling Sound (New York City, New York)
- Craig Burbidge – engineer (1, 5)
- Mitch Goldfarb – engineer (1–5, 7, 8), mix engineer (2–4, 7, 8)
- Robin Jenney – engineer (1, 5)
- Donnie Kraft – engineer (1, 5)
- Taavi Mote – mix engineer (1, 5)
- Harry Mosley – engineer (6)
- Bruce Weeden – engineer (6), mix engineer (6)
- Andy Batwinas – assistant engineer (1, 5)
- Liz Cluse – assistant engineer (1, 5)
- Brooke Hendricks – assistant engineer (1–5, 7, 8)
- Robert Kloss – assistant engineer (1, 5)
- Len Wehling – assistant engineer (1, 5)
- Paul Winger – assistant engineer (1, 5)
- Ryan Dorn – assistant engineer (2, 4)
- Jon Smeltz – assistant engineer (2)
