= Miles Jaye =

American R&B and jazz singer

- Born: Miles Jaye Davis; November 12, 1957 (age 68); Yonkers, New York, United States
- Origin: Brooklyn, New York City, United States
- Genres: R&B, jazz
- Occupations: Singer, violinist
- Instruments: Violin, keyboards, bass
- Years active: 1982–present
- Labels: Island, Black Tree
- Website: milesjaye.net

Miles Jaye Davis (born November 12, 1957), known professionally as Miles Jaye, is an American R&B and jazz singer, jazz violinist, songwriter, and record producer. He had several hits on the US R&B chart in the late 1980s and early 1990s, the biggest of which was "Let's Start Love Over" in 1987. He was for a time the lead singer of Village People.

== Life and career ==
He was born in Yonkers, New York, and studied music theory and classical violin for more than a decade at the Brooklyn Conservatory of Music, Saratoga School of Orchestral Studies, Indian Hill and Brooklyn College (now Brooklyn College Conservatory of Music). He also played flute, keyboards and bass while in the US Air Force, and launched his singing career while at Clarke Air Force Base in the Philippines.

Jaye toured Europe with jazz guitarist Eric Gale and singers Phyllis Hyman and Jon Lucien before taking over as "Cop" in the Village People in 1982. He stayed with the band for two years before launching his solo career and signing to Teddy Pendergrass' production company Top Priority Records. He released his debut album, Miles, on Island Records, and the song "Let's Start Love Over", written by Micheal Claxton was released as a single and rose to No. 5 on the Billboard R&B chart in late 1987. Its follow-up, "I've Been a Fool for You", a Jaye original, was also a top ten R&B hit. Jaye also contributed, as musician, songwriter and co-producer, to Pendergrass' hit 1988 album, Joy.

Jaye released two further albums on Island, Irresistible (1989) and Strong (1991), and continued to have hits on the R&B chart such as "Heaven" and "Objective" until 1991 before forming his own company, Black Tree Records, on which he released a string of increasingly jazz-influenced albums. He has also worked with leading jazz musicians including George Duke, Roy Ayers, Grover Washington, Jr. and Branford Marsalis.

== Discography ==
=== Studio albums ===
Year	Album	Peak chart positions	
Year	Album	US	US R&B
1987	Miles	125	18
1989	Irresistible	160	16
1991	Strong	—	54
1997	The Odyssey	—	—
1999	Romantic Storm	—	—
2002	Humanity	—	—
2008	Time to Get My Mind Right	—	—
2010	God's Creation	—	—
"—" denotes releases that did not chart.

=== Singles ===
Year	Single	Chart positions	
Year	Single	US R&B	UK
1987	"Let's Start Love Over" (with Roy Ayers)	5	77
1987	"I've Been a Fool for You"	8	—
1987	"Lazy Love"	—	—
1988	"Special Thing"	—	—
1989	"Objective"	10	—
1989	"I'll Be There"	30	—
1989	"Heaven"	12	78
1990	"Irresistible"	42	—
1991	"Sensuous"	42	—
1991	"Strong for You"	67	—
"—" denotes releases that did not chart.
