= Euphoria (Kendrick Lamar song) =

2024 single by Kendrick Lamar

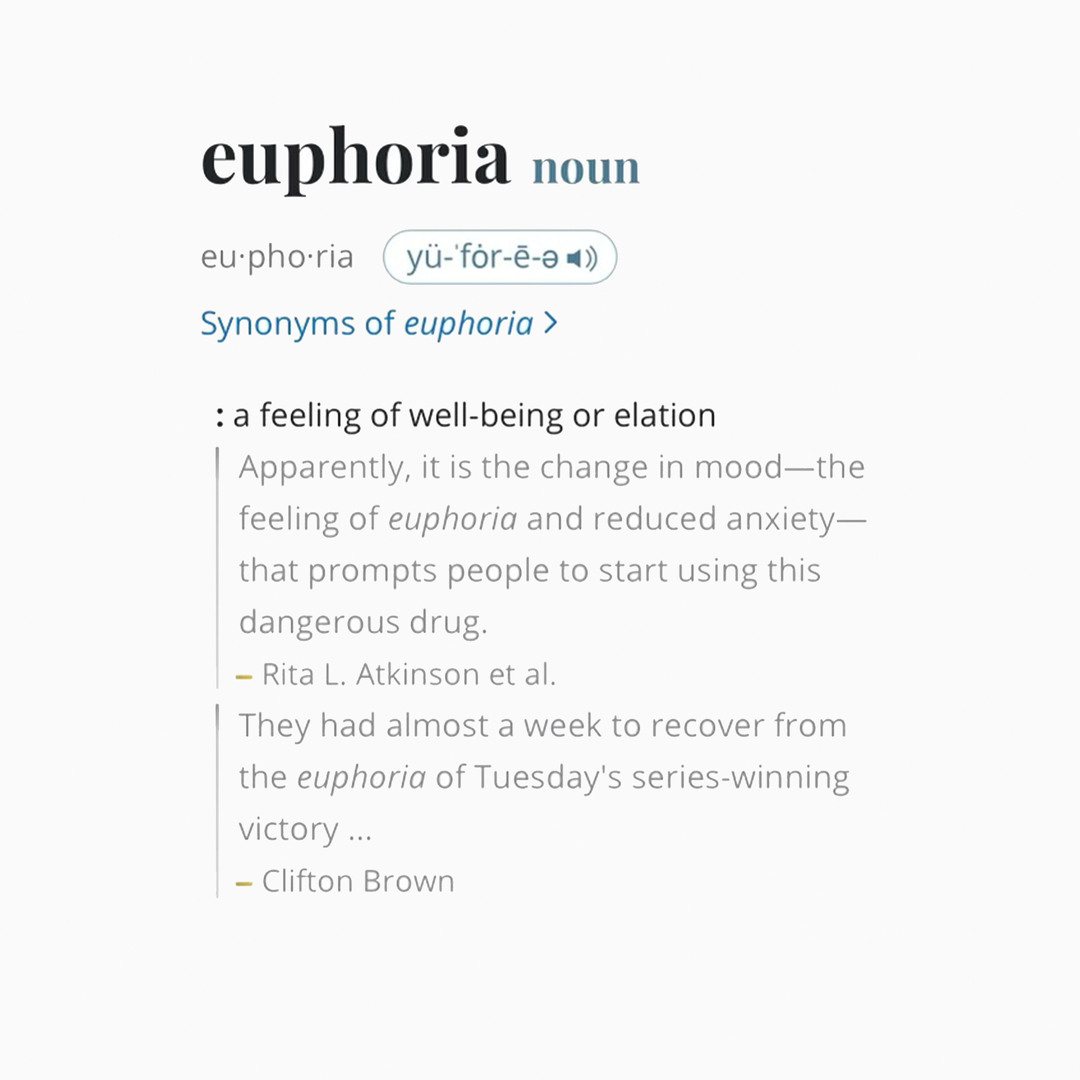

Single by Kendrick Lamar
- Released: April 30, 2024
- Recorded: April 2024
- Genre: Trap
- Length: 6:24
- Label: Interscope
- Songwriters: Kendrick Duckworth; Daveon "Yung Exclusive" Jackson; Johnny Juliano; Ronald LaTour Jr.; Maxwell Madejczyk; Mark Spears; Paul Beauregard; Kenneth Gamble; Jordan Houston; Leon Huff
- Producers: Cardo; Kyuro; Johnny Juliano; Sounwave; Yung Exclusive

Kendrick Lamar singles chronology
"Like That" (2024)	"Euphoria" (2024)	"6:16 in LA" (2024)

Audio video
- "Euphoria" on YouTube

"Euphoria" (stylized in all lowercase) is a diss track by the American rapper Kendrick Lamar released amidst his highly publicized feud with the Canadian rapper Drake. It was unexpectedly released on April 30, 2024, through Interscope Records, as a response to Drake's "Push Ups" and "Taylor Made Freestyle". It was initially a YouTube exclusive before being released to streaming platforms hours later.

"Euphoria" was produced by Cardo, Johnny Juliano, Kyuro, Sounwave, and Yung Exclusive. It credits Kenneth Gamble as a composer due to the introduction containing a sample of Teddy Pendergrass's 1981 song "You're My Latest, My Greatest Inspiration". The title is an apparent reference to the American teen drama series Euphoria, on which Drake serves as an executive producer. Lyrically, Lamar expresses his hatred for Drake, describing him as a scam artist and mocking his alleged insecurities regarding his race.

"Euphoria" was Lamar's first release following his departure from Top Dawg Entertainment and Aftermath Entertainment. It received positive reviews from critics, who praised its humorous yet hateful tone and Lamar's performance. It also performed commercially well, peaking at number three on the Billboard Hot 100 and Hot R&B/Hip-Hop Songs charts, and appearing on single charts in various countries. Lamar followed "Euphoria" with "6:16 in LA" on May 3, the same day Drake released his response, "Family Matters", to which the former responded with "Meet the Grahams" within less than an hour. Lamar later performed "Euphoria" at The Pop Out: Ken & Friends (2024), the Super Bowl LIX halftime show (2025), and the Grand National Tour (2025).

== Background ==
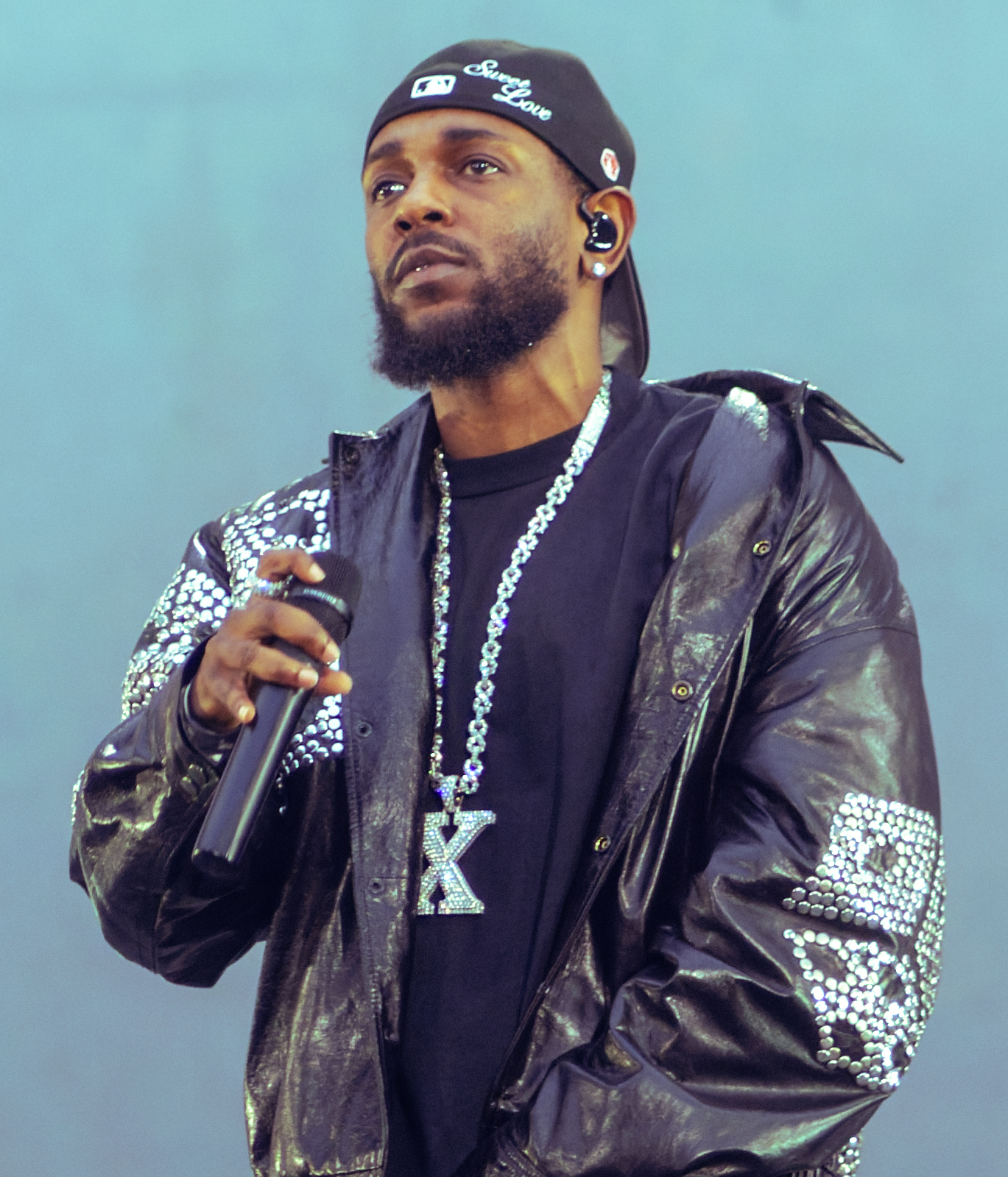
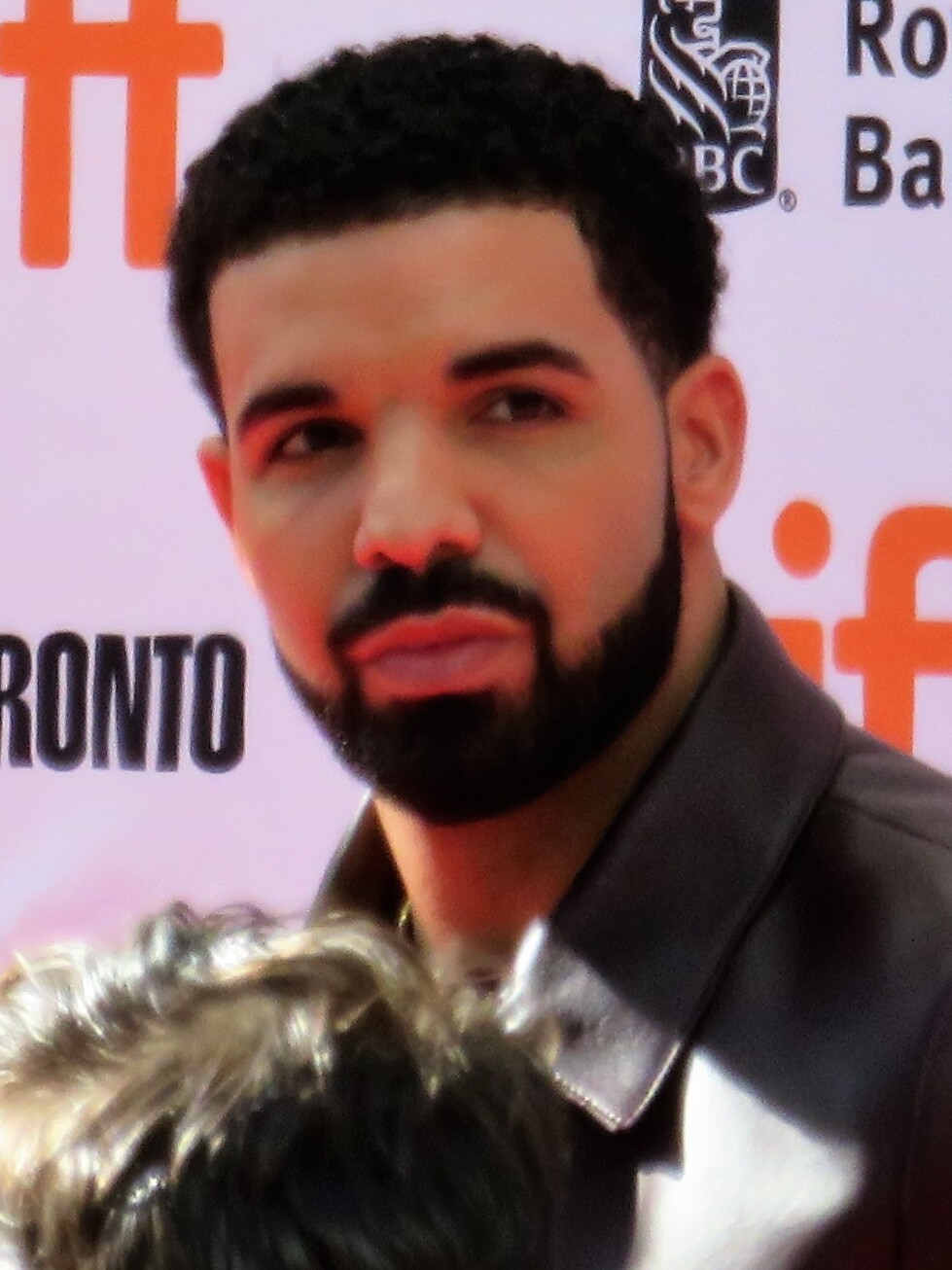
Kendrick Lamar and Drake feuded after the former released "Like That", as the latter responded with "Push Ups" and "Taylor Made Freestyle" in April 2024.

On March 22, 2024, Kendrick Lamar made a surprise appearance on Future and Metro Boomin's collaborative studio album We Don't Trust You on the single "Like That". His featured verse was a diss aimed at Drake and J. Cole in response to their single "First Person Shooter". Cole rebutted "Like That" first with the polarizing "7 Minute Drill", which he later retracted and removed from streaming services.

Drake offered two responses to "Like That". His first, "Push Ups", was premiered by media personality DJ Akademiks after a low-quality demo version that sampled "Get Money" by Junior M.A.F.I.A. was leaked. Throughout the song, Drake mocks Lamar's short stature and musical authenticity, all the while generating rumors of him being extorted by his former label, Top Dawg Entertainment (TDE).

The second response, "Taylor Made Freestyle", was released on Drake's social media accounts immediately after "Push Ups" was released to streaming platforms. The song used AI-generated vocals of Tupac Shakur and Snoop Dogg, two of Lamar's musical idols, to entice him to release his own response. Drake also questioned Lamar's friendship with singer-songwriter Taylor Swift, whom the freestyle is named after. Shakur's estate sent Drake a cease and desist letter accusing him of violating the rapper's personality rights and abusing his legacy. They further claimed that the AI-generated vocals being used against Lamar, a "good friend" of the estate who respected Shakur publicly and privately, compounded the disrespect. Drake was ordered to remove the song from his social media accounts or face litigation; he compiled with the former demand.

== Composition ==
"Euphoria"
A sample where Lamar is heard name dropping Gunna, and referencing the DMX interview on The Breakfast Club.

"Euphoria" is a trap song. It begins with an interpolation which was revealed to be a reversed audio clip of Lamar reading a line from The Wiz, a 1978 remake of The Wizard of Oz starring Michael Jackson (who Drake has often compared himself to), in which Richard Pryor, who plays the titular Wiz, states "Everything they say about me is true. I'm a phony." After this, "Euphoria" begins "softly" with Lamar waiting until the final line of the first verse to directly address Drake. The song's intro builds around a sample of Teddy Pendergrass's song "You're My Latest, My Greatest Inspiration". Lamar talks about a "paranoid", "pathetic", and "spiraling" master manipulator "fabricating stories on the family front". The beat then picks up as the delivery gets "sharper", while the rapper makes references to Drake's name ("Draco Pistol"), as well as the previous diss track "Taylor Made Freestyle".

Lamar later mentions Drake and J. Cole by name, criticizes Drake's parenting, and references "The Story of Adidon", a 2018 diss track by Pusha T aimed against Drake in the context of fatherhood. In other instances, he accuses Drake of being a "scam artist" and namedrops artists such as YNW Melly, Gunna, Daft Punk, P. Diddy, Pharrell Williams, Lil Yachty, and Sexyy Red. Lamar also accuses Drake of sending a cease and desist letter to prevent the release of "Like That": "Try cease and desist on the 'Like That' record / Ho, what? You ain't like that record?" Towards the end, Kendrick mocks Drake's accent, using the word "crodie" to insult him. Further references in the song include Drake's Meek Mill diss track "Back to Back" (2015).

Throughout "Euphoria", Lamar mocks Drake, who is biracial, for his alleged insecurities regarding his race, rapping: "I even hate when you say the word nigga, but that's just me, I guess / Some shit just cringeworthy, it ain't even gotta be deep, I guess." "Euphoria" ends with an interpolation of a line from Kanye West's 2004 song "Get 'Em High", which Lamar uses to argue that other rappers dislike Drake's use of nigga. Complex considered Lamar's use of "Get 'Em High" to convey this message noteworthy, as West also has a longstanding feud with Drake and had shown support for Lamar in a remix of "Like That" he produced with Metro Boomin and Future.

== Release and promotion ==
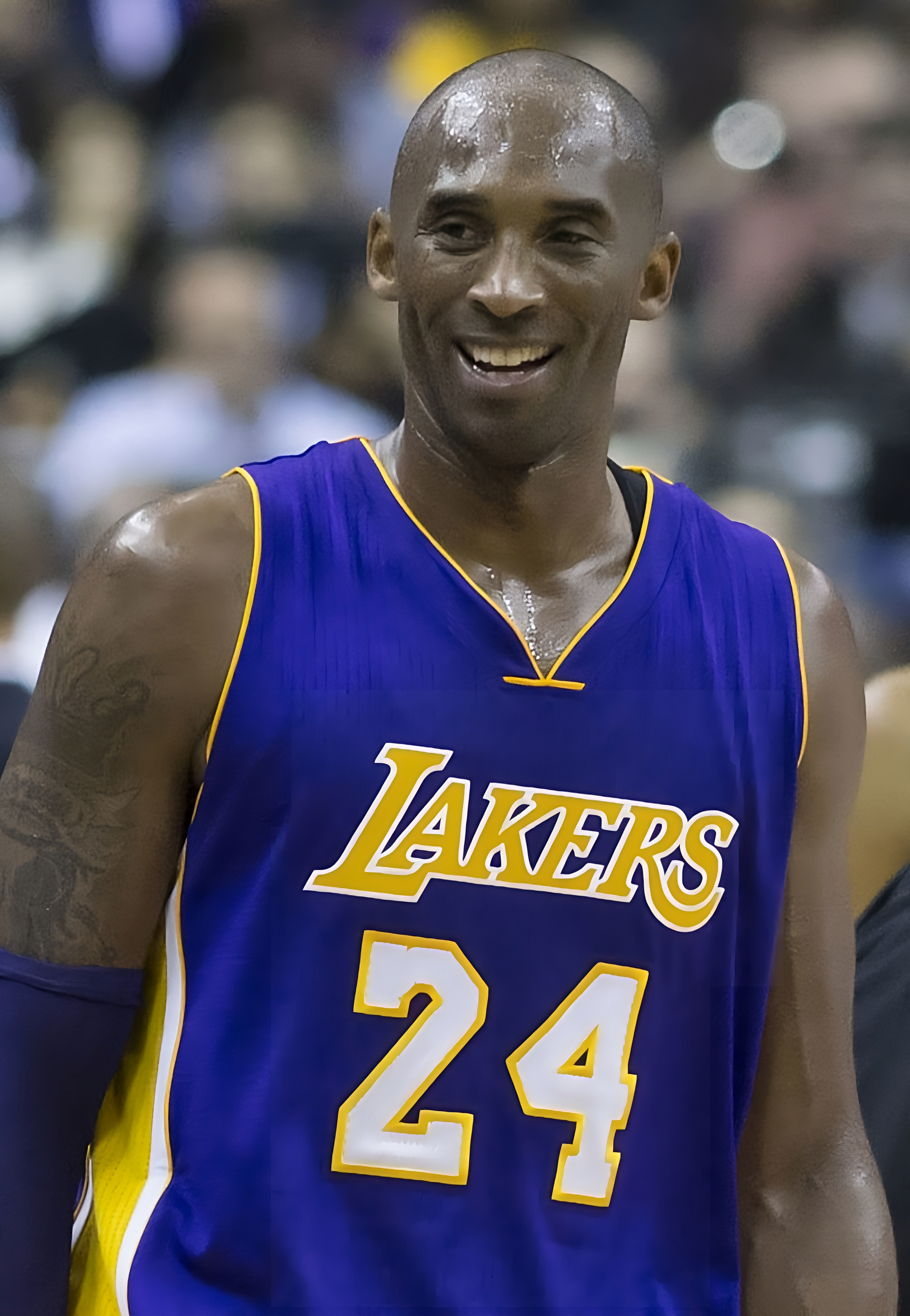
Reports noted that the upload of "Euphoria" at approximately 8:24 a.m. may have been a nod to basketball player Kobe Bryant, who wore the jersey number 24.

"Euphoria" was first released to YouTube on April 30, 2024, with no prior announcement. It was published on the platform at approximately 8:24 a.m. PT, which many speculated was a nod to the basketball player Kobe Bryant; he was a shooting guard for the Los Angeles Lakers under the jersey numbers 8 and 24. Hours after its YouTube launch, "Euphoria" was made available on music streaming services through Interscope Records. Brian Zisook, a co-founder of Audiomack, noted that the song is Lamar's first release under a new direct licensing agreement with Interscope following his departure from TDE and Aftermath Entertainment. His own creative communications company, PGLang, is involved in the deal, despite reports claiming it was not.

Its cover art is a screenshot of the Merriam-Webster online dictionary. One of the reference sentences from the dictionary is a quote from journalist Clifton Brown, which reads “They had almost a week to recover from the euphoria of Tuesday’s series-winning victory…” seemingly referencing the fact that the song was released on a Tuesday. The quote comes from a New York Times article from May 1990. Kendrick is seemingly claiming through the cover that this song will win the battle between him and Drake. Journalists believe that its title is also a reference to the American television series of the same name. Drake serves as an executive producer on the series, which has drawn controversy for its mature content, including sexual material, amongst its teenage characters.

== Critical reception ==
The song received generally positive reviews. Per a Complex assessment, which graded the song's lyrics, presentation, quality and overall effectiveness, "Euphoria" received a score of 42 out of 50 (84%). Its examiner, Peter A. Berry, concluded that the song is a "bit too sprawling" for its own good, and the production is "kinda mid," but it ultimately offers a "potent mix of skill, viciousness, and humor that would be hard for anyone to overcome."

Vivian Medithi of The Fader described "Euphoria" as a standout rap song and a "dynamic study in hating." Rolling Stone's Andre Gee was impressed at how Lamar sounded like a "seasoned vet" despite the song being his first official diss record. He noted that, while many of Lamar's criticisms had been expressed before, "the way he lobs his insults makes it a haymaker," concluding that the track was an "eruption of disdain" for Drake. Angel Diaz, writing for Billboard, described the song as containing "pure, unadulterated hate." Diaz felt that Lamar's response was "well worth the wait," praising its dense lyricism and opining that Drake's diss tracks up to that point had not "hit as hard" as "Like That" and "Euphoria".

In less favorable reviews, Pitchfork's Alphonse Pierre felt that "Euphoria" lacked a "knockout blow" that could have pushed Lamar's feud with Drake past "fleeting spectacle". Pierre felt that the track was substandard to other disses like Nas' "Ether", especially on the matter of what Pierre perceived as "gay jokes" in "Euphoria". Pierre also commented negatively on the song's production, believing that the track has "the worst beat switch-ups you'll hear all year." Ben Beaumont-Thomas for The Guardian similarly wrote that for someone whose artistry "rests on his self-presentation as flawed but enlightened," Beaumont-Thomas criticized the production, describing the beat as "blah even if Lamar does ride it with skill and animation."

== Commercial performance ==
"Euphoria" reached number one on the US Spotify charts, as well as number one on the US Apple Music and global music charts. It debuted at number eleven on the Billboard Hot 100, before reaching a new peak at number three the following week on the chart. In addition to the Hot 100, the single peaked at number three on the Hot R&B/Hip-Hop Songs chart, as well as number 39 on the Rhythmic Airplay chart. The single also peaked at number four on the Global 200.

Internationally, "Euphoria" peaked at number eleven on the UK Singles chart, finding greater success by peaking at number two on its Hip-Hop/R&B Singles chart. In Australia, the single peaked at number eight on its single chart, also peaking at number two on its Hip-Hop/R&B chart. Elsewhere, "Euphoria" peaked at number two in South Africa, number three in the Middle East/North Africa and United Arab Emirates, number four in Iceland and Saudi Arabia, and number five in Canada, Latvia, and New Zealand. Furthermore, the single appeared in the charts of Austria, the Czech Republic, Denmark, Finland, France, Germany, Greece, India, Ireland, Israel, Lithuania, Luxembourg, the Netherlands, Nigeria, Norway, Poland, Portugal, Singapore, Slovakia, Sweden, and Switzerland.

In the year-end charts of 2024, "Euphoria" ranked at number 22 on the Hot R&B/Hip-Hop Singles chart, number 66 on the Hot 100, number 81 in Canada, and number 185 on the Global 200. The single went on to be certified Silver by the British Phonographic Industry (BPI) for selling 200,000 units. In addition to the United Kingdom, it was certified Platinum in Australia, Brazil, and New Zealand, for selling 70,000, 40,000, and 30,000 units, respectively.

== Response and impact ==
Following the release of "Euphoria", Drake responded to the diss track by sharing a clip from romantic comedy 10 Things I Hate About You on Instagram, showing Julia Stiles' character reading the titular poem, comparing the similarities between the poem and Lamar's lyrics. On May 3, 2024, Lamar released "6:16 in LA" exclusively on Instagram, which took aim at Drake's label OVO Sound and insinuated its members as moles, threatening to expose his darkest secrets if he does not withdraw from the feud.

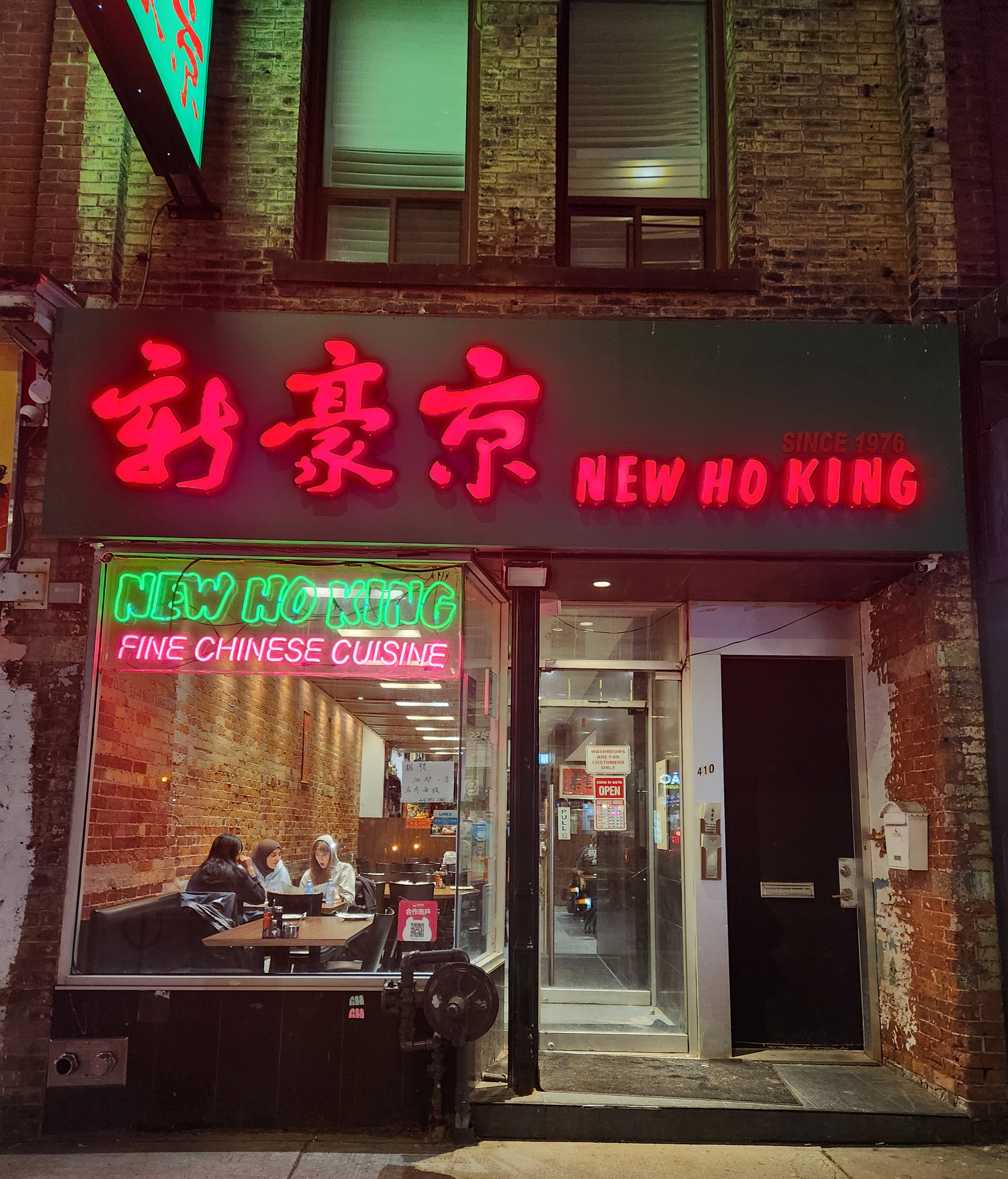
Toronto Chinese restaurant New Ho King received significant popularity following the release of "Euphoria", in which Lamar references the restaurant.

On the same day, Drake responded to "Euphoria" with "Family Matters", which features a three-beat structure similar to Lamar's diss track. Drake opens "Family Matters" with nigga, which Lamar rapped that he disliked Drake using, accused Lamar of being a deadbeat parent and domestic abuser, and repeated rumors that one of Lamar's children was fathered by his business partner Dave Free. Within less than an hour, Lamar released "Meet the Grahams", accusing Drake of multiple wrongdoings such as parental negligence, sexual exploitation, sexual grooming, sex trafficking, and another incident of child abandonment, structured as a letter in which Lamar addresses multiple members of Drake's family. The following day, Lamar released the more "club-friendly" track "Not Like Us", in which he alleges Drake's sexual behavior with minors, challenges his cultural identity, and accuses him of exploiting Black artists.

"Euphoria" sparked an impact on spaces outside of music. New Ho King, a Chinese restaurant located in Toronto's Chinatown neighborhood, was flooded with five-star reviews on Google Maps after it was mentioned in the track. In response to the reference, New Ho King added a "Kendrick Lamar Special" to their menu. Joe Biden's 2024 presidential campaign team used "Euphoria" in a video against his opponent, Donald Trump, overlaying edited lyrics criticizing Trump's behavior: "I hate the way that you walk over women's rights, the way that you talk about immigrants. I hate the way that you dress, I hate the way that you sneak diss on Truth Social." American wrestler CM Punk referenced "Euphoria" to Drew McIntyre on a Monday Night Raw episode, saying "You hate the way I walk, you hate the way I talk, the way I dress."

== Live performances ==
Lamar first performed "Euphoria" at the one-off concert The Pop Out: Ken & Friends at the Kia Forum in Inglewood on June 19, 2024, which featured updated lyrics aimed at Drake's possession of Shakur's crown ring. The concert held 16,000 attendees and was live streamed on Amazon Prime Video, later breaking the record for the most minutes watched of any Amazon Music video production across Prime Video and Twitch. On February 9, 2025, "Euphoria" was performed during the Super Bowl LIX halftime show, and was later included on the set list of Lamar's Grand National Tour (2025), co-headlined with SZA.

== Personnel ==
Credits are adapted from Tidal.

Musicians

- Kendrick Lamar – vocals, writing
- Daveon "Yung Exclusive" Jackson – writing, production
- Johnny Juliano – writing, production
- Ronald "Cardo" LaTour Jr. – writing, production
- Maxwell "Kyuro" Madejczyk – writing, production
- Mark "Sounwave" Spears – writing, production
- Paul "DJ Paul" Beauregard – writing
- Kenneth Gamble – writing, sampling
- Jordan "Juicy J" Houston – writing
- Leon Huff – writing, sampling

Technical

- Matthew Bernard – additional keyboards
- Ray Charles Brown Jr. – recording engineer
- Nicolas De Porcel – mastering engineer
- Jonathan Turner – mixing engineer

== Charts ==
=== Weekly charts ===
Weekly chart performance for "Euphoria"
Chart (2024)	Peak position
Australia (ARIA)	8
Australia Hip Hop/R&B (ARIA)	2
Austria (Ö3 Austria Top 40)	32
Canada Hot 100 (Billboard)	5
Czech Republic Singles Digital (ČNS IFPI)	38
Denmark (Tracklisten)	22
Finland (Suomen virallinen lista)	33
France (SNEP)	76
Germany (GfK)	46
Global 200 (Billboard)	4
Greece International (IFPI)	6
Iceland (Tónlistinn)	4
India (IMI)	10
Ireland (IRMA)	13
Israel (Mako Hitlist)	32
Latvia Streaming (LaIPA)	5
Lithuania (AGATA)	6
Luxembourg (Billboard)	7
MENA (IFPI)	3
Netherlands (Single Top 100)	39
New Zealand (Recorded Music NZ)	5
Nigeria (TurnTable Top 100)	71
Norway (VG-lista)	22
Poland (Polish Streaming Top 100)	46
Portugal (AFP)	7
Saudi Arabia (IFPI)	4
Singapore (RIAS)	20
Slovakia Singles Digital (ČNS IFPI)	17
South Africa Streaming (TOSAC)	2
Sweden (Sverigetopplistan)	26
Switzerland (Schweizer Hitparade)	13
UAE (IFPI)	3
UK Singles (Official Charts)	11
UK Hip Hop/R&B (Official Charts)	2
US Billboard Hot 100	3
US Hot R&B/Hip-Hop Songs (Billboard)	3
US Rhythmic Airplay (Billboard)	39

=== Year-end charts ===
2024 year-end chart performance for "Euphoria"
Chart (2024)	Position
Canada (Canadian Hot 100)	81
Global 200 (Billboard)	185
US Billboard Hot 100	66
US Hot R&B/Hip-Hop Songs (Billboard)	22

== Certifications ==
Certification for "Euphoria"
Region	Certification	Certified units/sales
Australia (ARIA)	Platinum	70,000^{‡}
Brazil (Pro-Música Brasil)	Platinum	40,000^{‡}
New Zealand (RMNZ)	Platinum	30,000^{‡}
United Kingdom (BPI)	Silver	200,000^{‡}
^{‡} Sales+streaming figures based on certification alone.
