= Hold Me (Teddy Pendergrass and Whitney Houston song) =

Single by Teddy Pendergrass and Whitney Houston

from the album Love Language and Whitney Houston
- B-side: "Love"
- Released: May 24, 1984
- Recorded: 1983
- Genre: R&B; soul
- Length: 6:00
- Label: Asylum
- Songwriters: Michael Masser; Linda Creed
- Producer: Michael Masser

Teddy Pendergrass singles chronology
| "I Want My Baby Back" (1984) | "Hold Me" (1984) | "You're My Choice Tonight (Choose Me)" (1984) |

Whitney Houston singles chronology
| "Hold Me" (1984) | "You Give Good Love" (1985) |

Licensed audio
- "Hold Me" on YouTube

"Hold Me" is a ballad duet performed by American singers Teddy Pendergrass and Whitney Houston. The song was originally recorded solo by Diana Ross for her 1982 album Silk Electric under the title "In Your Arms", with slightly different lyrics. The Pendergrass and Houston version appears on Pendergrass's eighth studio album Love Language (1984) and Houston's self-titled debut album (1985). It was written by Linda Creed and Michael Masser and production overseen by Masser.

"Hold Me" was the first single release of Houston's career and Pendergrass' first single since his near-fatal 1982 car accident. It was released as the first single off Pendergrass' Love Language album and eventually became a top 50 US and UK success while also becoming a top ten hit on the US R&B and AC charts, giving Houston her first taste of success prior to the release of her self-titled debut album. The song also found international success in some European countries outside the UK. It's most notable for contributing to Houston being rejected for a Grammy Award nomination in the Best New Artist category.

== Background and recording ==
By 1982, Teddy Pendergrass was a well-established R&B and soul artist with six RIAA-certified albums, including six consecutive gold records, of which four of those albums also went platinum while at Philadelphia International Records between 1977 and 1981. On March 18, 1982, however, Pendergrass's career was abruptly halted after the singer was involved in a car crash while driving home that night from a party and his Rolls-Royce Silver Spirit hit a guard rail, crossed onto the oncoming lane and hit two trees. The impact of the accident left him with a spinal cord injury making him a tetraplegic, paralyzed from the chest down and unable to walk again. Pendergrass would end up using a wheelchair for the rest of his life.

As a result of the tragic incident, his label Philadelphia International chose to release two albums to complete his contract, releasing This One's for You and Heaven Only Knows, both albums bombed upon release with no hit single. Pendergrass was then dropped from Philadelphia International in early 1983. During his time of recovery, Pendergrass underwent physical therapy and after realizing he could still sing, Pendergrass left the hospital and sought on seeking a new recording deal. However, Pendergrass discovered that many labels were reluctant to sign him due to his disability. By that late spring, however, Asylum Records offered him a contract to which he signed. Asylum, at the time, was being distributed by Elektra Records. Producer Michael Masser was then hired to produce the majority of Pendergrass's new album.

Around the same time, a 19-year-old aspiring singer from New Jersey named Whitney Houston had recently signed to Arista Records. Houston had spent the previous five years of her early career as a session background vocalist and fashion model. Prior to signing, Houston had made some noise with her participation on the respective albums, One Down by Material and Paul Jabara & Friends by Paul Jabara in 1982 and 1983 respectively, recording one song from each album, "Memories" and "Eternal Love", both songs earning her praise in the music press. During her early months as an Arista artist, Houston and label head Clive Davis set up showcases for producers to offer songs to Houston's debut album; however few came. By that summer, however, offers finally came in the form of Kashif and Jermaine Jackson. Around this period, Davis contacted Masser to view Houston's New York shows due to her performances of Masser's "The Greatest Love of All"; Masser obliged. After seeing her perform the song, the songwriter praised her vocal ability and offered to have Houston become the featured duet partner in a song he was working on with Pendergrass to which Davis agreed on the condition he contributed songs to Houston's debut; Masser agreed.

Prior to their recording, the song had been recorded under the title "In Your Arms" by singer Diana Ross on her 1982 album, Silk Electric, with Ross producing the session, rather than Masser. In the year prior to the recording, Masser had produced the hit duet "Tonight, I Celebrate My Love" recorded by Roberta Flack and Peabo Bryson and wanted to replicate that success with an unknown artist rather than an established one, which befuddled Pendergrass's Asylum Records executives who had noted of the R&B artist's previous success with singer Stephanie Mills on their duets though they eventually allowed it.

"Hold Me" was co-written by lyricist Linda Creed, who had previously written hits for the likes of The Stylistics and The Spinners among other acts in the 1970s. At the time, Creed was struggling with breast cancer, which she would later succumb from its complications in April 1986. Masser opted to record Pendergrass and Houston separately, first recording Pendergrass's vocals in his hometown of Philadelphia and then flying Houston out for a session in Los Angeles.

== Commercial reception ==
The song was officially released on May 24, 1984. On June 2, 1984, it debuted on Billboard's Black Singles chart at number 69. It would eventually rise to its peak position of number five on the chart on July 21, 1984 in its eighth week of release. It would spend four weeks in the top ten and 16 weeks in total on the chart, becoming Pendergrass' eighth top ten single (and seventh top five) single on the chart as well as his biggest hit since 1981's "You're My Latest, Greatest Inspiration" reached the top 5 in January 1982, while it became Houston's first of 26 top ten entries on the chart, as well as the first of 46 career chart entries.

On June 9, 1984, the song entered the Billboard Hot 100 at number 89. Eight weeks later, it reached its peak of number 46 on July 28, 1984. Though a more modest success, it would eventually spend 18 cumulative weeks on that chart, becoming Pendergrass' longest-charting single to date. It was the singer's sixth highest peak on the chart and was his seventh and last single to peak inside the top fifty while becoming the first of what would be 40 career chart entries for Houston.

On the magazine's adult contemporary charts, it was even more successful. After entering that chart on June 30, 1984 at number 30, it would reach its peak position of number 6 on August 18, 1984. It would spend 17 weeks on that chart. It would be Pendergrass' first of four entries on the AC chart and his most successful while it would be the first of 26 top ten hits for Houston. On the Cashbox charts, it peaked at numbers 47 and 7 on its pop and black singles charts respectively.

Globally, it would go on to be Pendergrass' most successful release. In the United Kingdom, it reached number 44 on the UK singles chart following the release of Houston's acclaimed self-titled debut album in February 1986, becoming Houston's and Pendergrass' fourth entry each, spending seven weeks on the chart in total. In Ireland, it peaked at number 25 and also peaked in the top 30 in the Flemish region of Belgium and the Netherlands, peaking at numbers 22 and 24 in the country's Dutch Top 40 and Dutch Single Top 100 charts respectively.

The ballad single contributed to Love Language becoming Pendergrass' seventh gold album in the United States and his first to be awarded such since It's Time for Love in 1981. In his unauthorized biography of Houston, American author James Robert Parish credited the song for "creating an identity for Whitney by matching her with established soul crooners".

== Critical reception ==
Ron Wynn of AllMusic highlighted this song when reviewing Pendergrass's album in 1984 and called it a good duet.

== Grammy controversy ==
With the song being released in 1984, Houston was told she was ineligible for the nomination of Grammy Award for Best New Artist at the 28th Grammy Awards in 1986, the year after her own debut album was released.

The decision prompted an angry letter from Clive Davis that was later posted on Billboard. Davis referred to the disqualification as "a conspicuous injustice" and compared the situation to artists such as Luther Vandross, Cyndi Lauper and Carly Simon, artists who had already received credits on other albums or been previously well known as a member of other acts prior to their nominations for the Best New Artist award.

The Recording Academy defended their decision, claiming the label had submitted "Hold Me" for consideration for the 27th Grammy Awards in 1985.

Despite this, the decision to not nominate Houston for Best New Artist remained controversial with Richard Marx and Geoff Mayfield later complaining of the decision, with Marx comparing it to them refusing to nominate him for the 30th Annual Grammy Awards after Jody Watley, formerly of the pop and soul group Shalamar, won the award that year, despite her group having earn Grammy nominations.

Mayfield also complained in 2000 about the Grammy refusal to nominate Houston while nominating and voting for Watley's win three years later.

== Accolades ==
The success of the song on the Billboard Adult Contemporary chart gave Houston her first rank on a Billboard list, landing at number 41 in the magazine's year-end adult contemporary list. The song was ranked the 35th best Whitney Houston song out of 40 of her songs by BET, which praised Houston's vocals on the song, noting "right out the gate, she was already going note for note with a legend."

== Live performances ==
"Hold Me" was rarely performed onstage by either singer. Due to Pendergrass' condition as well as Houston's busy recording schedule, no music video was ever produced and there were no televised performances. During her first world tour, the Greatest Love World Tour, the song was performed with Houston's half-brother Gary Garland.

In May 1987, a year after Linda Creed's death from breast cancer, Houston and Pendergrass would perform the song together at the Linda Creed Memorial Scholarship Fund in Philadelphia. It would be the only live performance of the song by Houston and Pendergrass together.

== Track listing and formats ==
US, 7" vinyl single
| No. | Title | Writer(s) | Length |
|---|---|---|---|
| 1. | "Hold Me" (with Whitney Houston) | Michael Masser; Linda Creed | 4:53 |
| 2. | "Love" (Teddy Pendergrass) | Masser; Randy Goodrum | 3:04 |

US, 12" vinyl single
| No. | Title | Length |
|---|---|---|
| 1. | "Hold Me" (with Whitney Houston) | 6:00 |
| 2. | "Love" (Teddy Pendergrass) | 3:04 |

== Personnel ==
- Vocals: Teddy Pendergrass and Whitney Houston
- Drums: Carlos Vega
- Bass: Nathan East
- Keyboards: Randy Kerber
- Guitars: Paul Jackson

== Charts ==
=== Weekly charts ===
1984-1986 weekly chart performance for Hold Me
| Chart (1984-1986) | Peak position |
|---|---|
| Belgium (Ultratop 50 Flanders) | 30 |
| Ireland (IRMA) | 25 |
| Netherlands (Dutch Top 40) | 22 |
| Netherlands (Single Top 100) | 24 |
| UK Singles (Official Charts) | 44 |
| US Billboard Hot 100 | 46 |
| US Adult Contemporary (Billboard) | 6 |
| US Hot R&B/Hip-Hop Songs (Billboard) | 5 |

| Chart (2012) | Peak position |
|---|---|
| South Korea International (Gaon) | 152 |

=== Year-end charts ===
| Chart (1984) | Position |
|---|---|
| US Top Adult Contemporary Singles (Billboard) | 41 |

== Bibliography ==
- Parish, James Robert (2003). Whitney Houston: The Unauthorized Biography. Aurum Press. ISBN 1-85410-921-9.
