= Life Is a Song Worth Singing (album) =

Studio album by Teddy Pendergrass
- Released: June 2, 1978
- Recorded: 1977–1978
- Studios: Sigma Sound, Philadelphia, Pennsylvania
- Genres: R&B, soul
- Length: 35:58
- Label: Philadelphia International
- Producers: Kenny Gamble, Leon Huff, Jack Faith, Gene McFadden, John Whitehead, Victor Carstarphen, Sherman Marshall

Teddy Pendergrass chronology
Teddy Pendergrass (1977)	Life Is a Song Worth Singing (1978)	Teddy (1979)

Singles from Life Is a Song Worth Singing
- 1. "Close the Door / Get Up, Get Down, Get Funky, Get Loose" Released: May 4, 1978; 2. "Only You / It Don't Hurt Now" Released: September 12, 1978

Life Is a Song Worth Singing is the second studio album by American musician Teddy Pendergrass. It was released on June 2, 1978, by Philadelphia International Records. Pendergrass supported the album by touring with the Isley Brothers.

The album contained two singles: "Only You" and "Close the Door". "Close the Door" reached number one on the US Billboard R&B music chart. The album peaked at number 11 on the US Billboard 200 and peaked at number one on the US Billboard R&B chart. It was nominated for Favorite Soul/R&B Album at the sixth annual American Music Awards, in 1979.

The title track is a cover of the Johnny Mathis hit single "Life Is a Song Worth Singing", which was released in 1973. The album was arranged by Jack Faith, Dexter Wansel, John L. Usry Jnr. and Thom Bell.

== Critical reception ==
Professional ratings
Review scores
Source	Rating
AllMusic	4.5/5 stars
Christgau's Record Guide	B+
The Rolling Stone Album Guide	3.5/5 stars

The Bay State Banner wrote that the "versatile sound is achieved through one of Gamble & Huff's favorite ploys—allowing many different arrangers and producers the chance to contribute to one album."

== Track listing ==
All tracks composed and produced by Kenny Gamble and Leon Huff; except where indicated

1. "Life Is a Song Worth Singing" (Thom Bell, Linda Creed; producer: Jack Faith)
2. "Only You"
3. "Cold, Cold World" (written and produced by Victor Carstarphen, Gene McFadden, John Whitehead)
4. "Get Up, Get Down, Get Funky, Get Loose"
5. "Close the Door"
6. "It Don't Hurt Now" (Sherman Marshall, Ted Wortham; producer: Marshall)
7. "When Somebody Loves You Back"

== Charts ==
Chart (1978)	Peak
U.S. Billboard Top LPs	11
U.S. Billboard Top Soul LPs	1

Singles

Year	Single	Peak chart positions		
Year	Single	US	US R&B	US Dan
1978	"Close the Door"	25	1	—
1978	"Only You"	106	22	29
1978	"Life Is a Song Worth Singing"	—	—	—

== See also ==
- List of number-one R&B albums of 1978 (U.S.)
