= Teddy Pendergrass (album) =

Studio album by Teddy Pendergrass
- Released: 1977
- Recorded: 1976–1977
- Studio: Sigma Sound, Philadelphia
- Genre: R&B, soul
- Label: Philadelphia International
- Producer: Kenny Gamble, Leon Huff, John Whitehead, Gene McFadden

Teddy Pendergrass chronology
Teddy Pendergrass (1977)	Life Is a Song Worth Singing (1978)

Singles from Teddy Pendergrass
- 1. "I Don't Love You Anymore / Somebody Told Me" Released: April 15, 1977; 2. "The Whole Town's Laughing At Me / The More I Get, The More I Want" Released: August 12, 1977

Professional ratings
Review scores
Source	Rating
AllMusic	4.5/5 stars
Christgau's Record Guide	B

Teddy Pendergrass is the debut solo album from the American R&B/soul singer Teddy Pendergrass, released in 1977.

It did well for a debut album, reaching No. 17 on the US Billboard 200 and No. 5 on the Billboard R&B album chart. Two singles were released: "I Don't Love You Anymore"; and "The Whole Town's Laughing at Me", reaching No. 41 pop & No. 5 R&B; and R&B No. 16, respectively.

== Track listing ==
No.	Title	Writer(s)	Length
1.	"You Can't Hide from Yourself"	Kenneth Gamble; Leon Huff	4:08
2.	"Somebody Told Me"	Victor Carstarphen; Gamble; Gene McFadden; John Whitehead	5:15
3.	"Be Sure"	Gamble; Huff	5:19
4.	"And If I Had"	Gamble; Huff	4:26
5.	"I Don't Love You Anymore"	Gamble; Huff	4:01
6.	"The Whole Town's Laughing at Me"	Sherman Marshall; Ted Wortham	4:30
7.	"Easy, Easy, Got to Take It Easy"	Victor Carstarphen; Gamble; Gene McFadden; John Whitehead	4:55
8.	"The More I Get, the More I Want"	Victor Carstarphen; Gamble; Gene McFadden; John Whitehead	4:26
Total length:			37:00

== Personnel ==
- Teddy Pendergrass – vocals
- Roland Chambers – guitar
- Dennis Harris – guitar
- Dexter Wansel – keyboards, synthesizers
- Victor Carstarphen – keyboards, synthesizers
- Ron Kersey – keyboards, synthesizers
- Michael "Sugar Bear" Foreman – bass
- Jimmy Williams – bass
- Keith Benson – drums, percussion
- Karl Chambers – drums, percussion
- Charles Collins – drums, percussion
- Larry Washington – bongos, congas
- MFSB – strings, horns
- Bobby Martin – arrangements
- Jack Faith – arrangements
- Ed Lee – album design, artwork
- Frank Laffitte – photography

== Charts ==
=== Weekly charts ===
Chart (1977)	Peak position
US Billboard 200	17
US Top R&B/Hip-Hop Albums (Billboard)	5

=== Year-end charts ===
Chart (1977)	Position
US Billboard 200	50
US Top R&B/Hip-Hop Albums (Billboard)	12

=== Singles ===
Year	Single	Peak chart positions		
Year	Single	US	US R&B	US Dan
1977	"I Don't Love You Anymore"	41	5	7
1977	"You Can't Hide from Yourself"	—	—	7
1977	"The More I Get, the More I Want"	—	—	7
1977	"The Whole Town's Laughing at Me"	102	16	—

== Later samples ==
- "You Can't Hide from Yourself"
  - "Portrait of a Masterpiece" by the D.O.C. from the album No One Can Do It Better
- "And If I Had"
  - "Devil's Pie" by D'Angelo from the album Voodoo
  - "Cradle to the Grave" by Mobb Deep from the album The Infamous
- "Easy Easy Got to Take It Easy"
  - "Not Enough" by Little Brother from the album The Minstrel Show
- "Somebody Told Me" **"Backtight" by Jaheim from the album "Still Ghetto"
