= Turn Off the Lights =

Single by Teddy Pendergrass

from the album Teddy
- B-side: "If You Know Like I Know"
- Released: June 23, 1979
- Studio: Sigma Sound, Philadelphia, Pennsylvania
- Length: 5:55 (12-inch version); 3:36 (7-inch version)
- Songwriter(s): Gamble and Huff
- Producer(s): Gamble and Huff

"Turn Off the Lights" was a hit for R&B crooner Teddy Pendergrass, released as a single on June 23, 1979. Released from his hit album, Teddy, the song hit No. 48 on the Pop charts and No. 2 on the R&B charts.

The song was also a b-side single with "If You Know Like I Know." The song was sampled in "I'm Not Havin' It" by MC Lyte and Positive K and "Shots" by 9th Wonder featuring Big Dho, Sean Price and Rapsody. Nuyorican singer La India released a salsa version in 2010.

== Content and style ==
Regarded as one of Pendergrass's famous "bedroom ballads" at the time among R&B audiences as well as adult contemporary audiences, the song involves the narrator who gently tells his mate to "turn off the lights" in order for both to enjoy the intimate pleasures. He then transitions his vocal inflection to a rougher singing style and utilizes this command sentence: "TURN 'EM OFF!" "Turn Off the Lights" was produced by Gamble and Huff.

== Track listing ==
=== Single release ===
No.	Title	Length
1.	"Turn Off The Lights"	3:37
2.	"If You Know Like I Know"	3:39
