= A Little More Magic =

Studio album by Teddy Pendergrass
- Released: September 14, 1993
- Studio: Crystal Clear (Cincinnati, Ohio); Sigma Sound (Philadelphia); Kajem (Gladwyne, Pennsylvania); Aire LA (Glendale, California); Larrabee East (Los Angeles); RISE Labs (Los Angeles); Ocean Way (Hollywood, California); Midtown (Cleveland, Ohio); Chameleon (Montclair, New Jersey)
- Length: 58:57
- Label: Elektra
- Producer: Reggie Calloway; Vincent Calloway; Victor Cooke; Leon Huff; Gerald Levert; Edwin Nicholas; Teddy Pendergrass; Barry White; Bobby Wooten

Teddy Pendergrass chronology
Truly Blessed (1991)	A Little More Magic (1993)	You and I (1997)

Professional ratings
Review scores
Source	Rating
AllMusic	link

A Little More Magic is the twelfth studio album by American R&B singer Teddy Pendergrass. It was released by Elektra Records on September 14, 1993. This was the third and last album Pendergrass recorded for Elektra, and was commercially the least successful of the three despite featuring songwriting and production credits from well-known names such as Barry White, Gerald Levert and Leon Huff as well as Reggie and Vincent Calloway.

The album peaked at number 92 on the U.S. Billboard 200 and number 13 on the Top R&B/Hip-Hop Albums. Whereas the two previous Pendergrass albums had each included an R&B chart-topping single to give sales impetus, the most successful single from A Little More Magic, "Believe in Love", stalled at number 14 on the R&B charts.

== Track listing ==
A Little More Magic track listing
No.	Title	Writer(s)	Producer(s)	Length
1.	"Believe in Love"	Reggie Calloway; Vincent Calloway; Teddy Pendergrass; Steve Beckham; Keith Robinson	R. Calloway; V. Calloway; Beckham^{[a]}; Robinson^{[a]}	4:54
2.	"Slip Away"	Reggie Calloway; V. Calloway; Joel Davis; Gene Robinson	Reggie Calloway; V. Calloway	4:58
3.	"I'm Always Thinking About You"	Leon Huff; Stephanie Huff	L. Huff; Pendergrass	5:20
4.	"I Choose You"	Victor Cooke; Leon Evans; Pendergrass	Cooke; Pendergrass; Evans^{[a]}; Jay Bright^{[a]}	5:41
5.	"Voodoo"	Gerald Levert; Edwin Nicholas	Levert; Nicholas	6:31
6.	"Tender"	Pendergrass; Dennis Markosky; R. Calloway	Reggie Calloway; V. Calloway	5:06
7.	"Can't Help Nobody"	Reggie Calloway; V. Calloway; Robinson; Davis; Pendergrass	Reggie Calloway; V. Calloway	6:15
8.	"A Little More Magic"	Reggie Calloway	R. Calloway; V. Calloway	4:34
9.	"My Father's Child"	Reggie Calloway; V. Calloway; Robinson; Pendergrass	Reggie Calloway; V. Calloway	7:30
10.	"Say It"	Barry White; Ollie Brown; Phillip Ingram	White	3:58
11.	"No One Like You"	Pendergrass; Bobby Wooten	Wooten	3:31
12.	"Reprise"			0:39
Total length:				58:57

Notes

- ^{^[a]} denotes a co-producer

== Personnel ==
- Joe Alexander – engineer
- Susan Becker – assistant engineer
- Stephen Beckham – keyboards
- Charles "Poogie" Bell, Jr. – drums
- Chuckii Booker – guitar, overdubs
- Randy Bowland – guitar
- Tony Bridges – bass
- Jay Bright – arranger, backing vocals
- Craig Burbidge – mixing
- Reggie Calloway – arranger, backing vocals, executive producer, drum programming, mixing
- Vincent Calloway – trombone, trumpet, arranger, mellophonium, backing vocals, metaphone, producer, executive producer, horn arrangements, mixing
- David Campbell – arranger, string arrangements
- Scott Cannady – bass guitar
- Rob Chiarelli – engineer, drum programming
- Victor Emanuel Cooke – drums, keyboards, backing vocals, producer, drum programming, mixing
- Joel Davis – keyboards, backing vocals
- Michael J. Dexter – trombone
- Curtis Dowd, Jr. – keyboards
- Leon Evans – keyboards
- Jack Faith – arranger, conductor
- Christopher Farr – tenor saxophone
- Charles Fearing – guitar
- Carol Friedman – art direction, photography
- Dean Gant – piano, keyboards
- Mitch Goldfarb – engineer, mixing
- Jason C. Golley – trumpet
- Doug Grigsby – synthesizer
- Leon Huff – piano, keyboards, producer, drum programming
- Quinton Joseph – percussion, drum programming
- Ron Kerber – trumpet, saxophone
- Jim Krause – engineer
- Gerald LeVert – arranger, backing vocals
- Bobby Lovelace – drums, overdubs
- Jeremy Lubbock – arranger, string arrangements
- Dennis Matkosky – synthesizer, piano, keyboards
- Taavi Mote – engineer
- Derek Nakamoto – keyboards, keyboard programming
- Edwin Nicholas – drums, keyboards, sequencing
- William Patterson – electric guitar
- Teddy Pendergrass – vocals, backing vocals, producer, executive producer, drum programming
- Jack Perry – engineer
- James Poyser – arranger, backing vocals
- Land Richards – drums
- Gene Robinson, Jr. – guitar
- Keith Robinson – drum programming
- Mike Ross – engineer
- Michael Scalcione – engineer
- Ron A. Schafer – engineer
- Al Schmitt – engineer
- William Simmons – keyboard programming
- Norman Spratt – saxophone
- Mike Mixx Tarisa – engineer
- Pete Tokar – engineer
- A. Daniel Tomassone – trombone, bass trombone
- Gerald Veasley – bass
- Freddie "Ready Freddie" Washington – bass
- Dennis Wasko – trumpet
- Dave Way – drums, drum programming
- Barry White – producer
- Dennis Williams – conductor, string arrangements
- Bobby Wooten – arranger, keyboards
- William Zaccagni – saxophone
- Joy Unlimited, Portia Griffin, Paula Halloway, Stacey Harcum, Annette Hardeman, Spencer Harris, D. Harvey, Charlene Holloway, Paula Holloway, Jeanne Jones, Kipper Jones, Patti LaBelle, Jean McClain, Frank McComb, Karen Roberts, Earl Robinson, Rene Robinson, Donnell Spencer, Lisa Stevens, Eddie Stockley, Elisabeth Williams, Youth Mass Choir, Bridget White, Darryl White, Fred White, Shaherha White, Kenny O. Bobiens – backing vocals

== Charts ==
=== Weekly charts ===
Chart (1993)	Peak position
US Billboard 200	92
US Top R&B/Hip-Hop Albums (Billboard)	13

=== Year-end charts ===
Chart (1994)	Position
US Top R&B/Hip-Hop Albums (Billboard)	74
