= This Christmas (I'd Rather Have Love) =

Studio album by Teddy Pendergrass
- Released: September 15, 1998
- Length: 49:43
- Label: Surefire

Teddy Pendergrass chronology
You and I (1997)	This Christmas (I'd Rather Have Love) (1998)

This Christmas (I'd Rather Have Love) is the fourteenth and final studio album by American singer Teddy Pendergrass. It was released by Surefire Records on September 15, 1998. Upon release, the album debuted at number 83 on the US Top R&B/Hip-Hop Albums chart. In 2010, it peaked at number 43 on the Top Holiday Albums chart.

== Critical reception ==
Professional ratings
Review scores
Source	Rating
AllMusic	3/5 stars

AllMusic reviewer Marvin Jolly wrote that "Pendergrass' smoldering vocals make This Christmas (I'd Rather Have Love) one of the most romantic seasonal records on the market."

== Track listing ==
No.	Title	Writer(s)	Length
1.	"Joy to the World"	Lowell Mason; Isaac Watts	5:02
2.	"The Little Drummer Boy"	Katherine K. Davis; Henry Onorati; Harry Simeone	4:07
3.	"Christmas and You"	Teddy Pendergrass; Jim Salamone	4:09
4.	"The Christmas Song"	Mel Tormé; Robert Wells	4:09
5.	"Having a Christmas Party"	Reggie Calloway	4:50
6.	"I Won't Have Christmas"	Reggie Calloway; Pendergrass	3:16
7.	"We Three Kings"	John Henry Hopkins Jr.	5:28
8.	"Oh Holy Night"	Traditional	4:20
9.	"Happy Kwanzaa"	Reggie Calloway	5:12
10.	"This Christmas (I'd Rather Have Love)"	Dodd Stocker-Edwards	2:47
11.	"Happy Xmas (War Is Over)"	John Lennon; Yoko Ono	5:38

== Charts ==
Chart (1998)	Peak position
US Top R&B/Hip-Hop Albums (Billboard)	83

Chart (2010)	Peak position
US Top Holiday Albums (Billboard)	48
