= Paul Jackson =

Paul Jackson may refer to:

== Arts and entertainment ==
- Paul Jackson (bassist) (1947–2021), American jazz fusion bassist
- Paul Jackson Jr. (born 1959), American jazz fusion guitarist
- Paul Jackson (poker player), English professional poker player
- Paul Jackson (producer) (born 1947), British television producer
- Paul Jackson (game producer) (born 1962), British video game publisher
- Paul Jackson (artist) (born 1968), American watercolorist
- Paul Jackson, a playable character in the video game Call of Duty 4: Modern Warfare

== Sports ==
- Paul Jackson (ice hockey) (born 1940), Canadian retired professional ice hockey defenceman
- Paul Jackson (Irish cricketer) (born 1959), Irish cricketer
- Paul Jackson (Australian cricketer) (born 1961), Australian cricketer for Victoria and Queensland
- Paul Jackson (rugby league) (born 1978), English rugby league player

== See also ==
- Paul Jackson Pollock (1912–1956), American painter
