= TP (Teddy Pendergrass album) =

Studio album by Teddy Pendergrass
- Released: July 25, 1980
- Recorded: 1979–1980
- Genre: R&B; soul
- Length: 39:20
- Label: Philadelphia International
- Producer: Ashford & Simpson; Dexter Wansel; Cecil Womack; John R. Faith; Jerry Cohen; Gene McFadden; John Whitehead

Teddy Pendergrass chronology
Live! Coast to Coast (1979)	TP (1980)	It's Time for Love (1981)

Singles from TP
- 1. "Can't We Try / This Gift of Life" Released: June 12, 1980; 2. "Love T.K.O. / I Just Called to Say" Released: October 2, 1980

TP is the fourth album by American R&B singer Teddy Pendergrass, released on July 25, 1980. It reached No. 14 on the US pop albums chart and No. 3 on the US R&B albums chart. It spawned the top ten singles, "Can't We Try", which was also featured in the soundtrack to the film Roadie, and "Love T.K.O." TP is Pendergrass's only album while at Philadelphia International Records made without any input from label founders Kenneth Gamble and Leon Huff.

== Critical reception ==
Professional ratings
Review scores
Source	Rating
AllMusic	4.5/5 stars
Robert Christgau	A−
Rolling Stone	(favorable)
Tom Hull – on the Web	B+

The Globe and Mail deemed the album "disco Muzak at its most innocuous: lame, unoriginal, and curiously sexless." The New York Times wrote that "the strongest cuts ... were all ballads that showed Mr. Pendergrass developing long narrative laments with unprecedented subtlety and emotional conviction."

== Track listing ==
Side one
No.	Title	Writer(s)	Length
1.	"Is It Still Good to Ya"	Nickolas Ashford, Valerie Simpson	4:35
2.	"Take Me in Your Arms Tonight" (duet with Stephanie Mills)	Dexter Wansel, Cynthia Biggs	5:24
3.	"I Just Called to Say"	Cecil Womack	4:28
4.	"Can't We Try"	Ken Hirsch, Ron Miller	5:04
Total length:			19:31

Side two
No.	Title	Writer(s)	Length
1.	"Feel the Fire" (duet with Stephanie Mills)	Peabo Bryson	5:31
2.	"Girl You Know"	Nickolas Ashford, Valerie Simpson	4:03
3.	"Love T.K.O."	Womack, Eddie "Gip" Nobel	5:00
4.	"Let Me Love You"	Jerry Cohen, Gene McFadden, John Whitehead	5:15
Total length:			19:49

2016 Expanded Edition CD reissue bonus tracks
No.	Title	Writer(s)	Length
9.	"This Gift of Life" (12" Long Version)	Kenneth Gamble, Leon A. Huff	4:39
10.	"Take Me in Your Arms Tonight" (12" Long Version)	Wansel, Biggs	7:00
11.	"Can't We Try" (Single Version)	Hirsch, Miller	3:42
12.	"Love T.K.O." (Single Version)	Womack, Nobel	3:43
13.	"Is It Still Good to Ya" (Single Version)	Ashford, Simpson	3:45
Total length:			22:49

== Charts ==
=== Weekly charts ===
Chart (1980)	Peak
US Billboard Top LPs	14
US Billboard Top Soul LPs	3

=== Singles ===
Year	Single	Peak chart positions		
Year	Single	US	US R&B	US Dan
1980	"Can't We Try"	52	3	52
1980	"Love T.K.O."	44	2	—
