= You and I (Teddy Pendergrass album) =

Studio album by Teddy Pendergrass
- Released: April 15, 1997
- Length: 44:00
- Label: Wind-Up
- Producer: Terry Coffey; Dennis Matkosky; Jon Nettlesbey; Teddy Pendergrass; Jim Salamone

Teddy Pendergrass chronology
A Little More Magic (1993)	You and I (1997)	This Christmas (I'd Rather Have Love) (1998)

You and I is the thirteenth studio album by American singer Teddy Pendergrass. It was released on April 15, 1997, on Wind-Up Records. Pendergrass, who had a hand in writing and producing all the tracks except for the interlude, the title track and "One in a Million You", which was a cover of the 1980 Larry Graham song of the same name, consulted Terry Coffey, Dennis Matkosky, Jon Nettlesbey, and Jim Salamone to work with him on You and I.

The album peaked at number 137 on the US Billboard 200 and number 24 on the US Top R&B/Hip-Hop Albums chart. Lead single "Give It to Me" peaked at number 57 on the US Hot R&B/Hip-Hop Songs, while "Don't Keep Wastin' My Time" reached number 90 on the Billboard Hot 100. You and I marks Pendergrass's final regular studio album, though he released a Christmas album in 1998 and two live albums in 2002 and 2009.

== Critical reception ==
Professional ratings
Review scores
Source	Rating
AllMusic	3/5 stars

AllMusic editor Stephen Thomas Erlewine found that "even though the album is not perfect, [Pendergrass] largely succeeds. The material on You and I is fairly uneven, but the best moments on the album, including 'Let's Talk About It' and the title track, demonstrate that Pendergrass still has the ability to create richly seductive urban soul. It's his best album in years."

== Track listing ==
No.	Title	Writer(s)	Producer(s)	Length
1.	"Don't Keep Wasting My Time"	Jim Salamone; Joshua Yudkin; Teddy Pendergrass	Salamone; Pendergrass	4:09
2.	"Let's Talk About It"	Salamone; Pendergrass	Salamone; Pendergrass	4:01
3.	"Without You"	Salamone; Yudkin; Pendergrass	Salamone; Pendergrass	4:37
4.	"You and I"	Jon Nettlesbey; Terry Coffey	Nettlesbey; Coffey	5:01
5.	"Can We Try"	Salamone; Yudkin; Pendergrass	Salamone; Pendergrass	4:50
6.	"One in a Million You"	Sam Dees	Salamone; Pendergrass	6:33
7.	"Hurry Up"	Anthony Chandeler; Nettlesbey; Pendergrass; Coffey	Nettlesbey; Coffey	5:09
8.	"Interlude"			1:15
9.	"Give It to Me"	Salamone; Pendergrass	Salamone; Pendergrass	4:23
10.	"Slow Ride to Heaven"	Dennis Matkosky; Pendergrass; Tom Whitlock	Matkosky; Pendergrass	4:01

== Charts ==
Chart (1997)	Peak position
US Billboard 200	137
US Top R&B/Hip-Hop Albums (Billboard)	24
