= Love Language (Teddy Pendergrass album) =

Studio album by Teddy Pendergrass
- Released: May 29, 1984
- Recorded: 1983–1984
- Genres: R&B, soul
- Length: 35:06
- Label: Asylum
- Producers: Michael Masser, Luther Vandross

Teddy Pendergrass chronology
Heaven Only Knows (1983)	Love Language (1984)	Workin' It Back (1985)

Singles from Love Language
- 1. "Hold Me (featuring Whitney Houston)"; 2. "You're My Choice Tonight (Choose Me)"

Professional ratings
Review scores
Source	Rating
AllMusic	3/5 stars

Love Language is the eighth album by R&B/soul singer Teddy Pendergrass, released on May 29, 1984. It was his first record for Asylum Records after being a longtime artist on Philadelphia International Records. It did much better on the Billboard 200 than his last two records, peaking at number 38. He had not reached the top 40 on the album charts since 1981's It's Time for Love. The album was composed and produced by Michael Masser, with the exception of the track You're My Choice Tonight (Choose Me) (#15 R&B chart, November 3, 1984), which was produced by Luther Vandross and featured Cissy Houston on background vocals and as "Solo Female Voice".

Hold Me (#46 Hot 100, July 28, 1984; #6 Adult Contemporary Chart) written by Masser and Linda Creed was a duet with Whitney Houston (it later turned up on Houston's debut album). As a result of having recorded this duet in 1984, Houston was disqualified from consideration as Grammy Best New Artist of 1985. Despite this, it helped the album earn a gold award from the Recording Industry Association of America (RIAA) for sales of 500,000 copies in September 1984, Pendergrass' first gold album since It's Time for Love was certified in December 1981.

The track "In My Time" reached number 11 on the South African charts, spending seven weeks in the top 20.

Songs from the album were used on the soundtrack to Alan Rudolph's 1984 film Choose Me. In her review of the film, critic Pauline Kael stated: "The songs are performed by Teddy Pendergrass and he's just right. The entire movie has a lilting, loose, choreographic flow to it." Also in 1984, "Stay with Me" was included in Miami Vice's season 1 episode "No Exit" (episode 8).

== Track listing ==
1. "In My Time" (Michael Masser, Cynthia Weil) – 3:48
2. "So Sad the Song" (Gerry Goffin, Masser) – 3:23
3. "Hot Love" (Linda Creed, Masser, Ray Parker Jr.) – 4:43
4. "Stay with Me" (Goffin, Masser) – 4:19
5. "Hold Me" (Duet with Whitney Houston) (Creed, Masser) – 5:59
6. "You're My Choice Tonight (Choose Me)" (Marcus Miller, Luther Vandross) – 4:48
7. "Love" (Randy Goodrum, Masser) – 4:28
8. "This Time Is Ours" (Goffin, Masser) – 3:22

== Personnel and production ==
=== Tracks 1–5, 7 and 8 arranged and produced by Michael Masser for Prince Street Productions, Inc. ===
- Strings and Rhythm arranged by Gene Page, Lee Holdridge
- Recording engineers: Michael Mancini, Dean Burt, Guy Charbonneau, Cliff Bonnell
- Mixed by Guy Charbonneau
- Remix by Bill Schnee
- Mastering engineer: Doug Sax
- Drums: Carlos Vega
- Bass: Nathan East
- Keyboards: Randy Kerber, Michael Masser (on "So Sad The Song"), Ray Parker Jr. (also played guitars on "Hot Love")
- Guitars: Louis Shelton, Paul Jackson (on "Stay With Me")
- Background vocals Teddy Pendergrass, Tenita Jordan

=== *Track 6 arranged and produced by Luther Vandross for Vandross Ltd. ===
- Rhythm arrangements: Marcus Miller
- Strings and horns arranged by Nat Adderley Jr.
- Recording engineers: Ray Bardani, Michael Barbiero, Doug Epstein, Michael Brauer, Guy Charbonneau
- Drums: Yogi Horton
- Percussion: Steve Kroon, Errol "Crusher" Bennett
- Bass/Synthesizer: Marcus Miller
- Keyboards: Nat Adderley Jr.
- Guitars: Doc Powell
- Background vocals: Cissy Houston, David Lasley, Richard Marx, Fonzi Thornton, Robin Clark, Tawatha Agee, Alfa Anderson, Brenda White, Debbie Thomas, Phillip Ballou, Michelle Phillip Ballou Cobbs, Luther Vandross

== Charts ==
Chart performance for Love Language
Chart (1984)	Peak position
Canada Top Albums/CDs (RPM)	81
US Billboard 200	38
US Top R&B/Hip-Hop Albums (Billboard)	4

== Certifications ==
Region	Certification	Certified units/sales
United States (RIAA)	Gold	500,000^{^}
^{^} Shipments figures based on certification alone.
