= Only You (Teddy Pendergrass song) =

Single by Teddy Pendergrass

from the album Life Is a Song Worth Singing
- B-side: "It Don't Hurt Now"
- Released: September 2, 1978
- Recorded: 1977–1978
- Studio: Sigma Sound, Philadelphia, Pennsylvania
- Genre: Soul; Disco
- Length: 5:07
- Label: Philadelphia International Records
- Songwriters: Kenny Gamble; Leon Huff

"Only You" is the second single from Teddy Pendergrass's 1978 album, Life Is a Song Worth Singing. It was released on September 2. The song peaked at #29 on the Dance Charts and #22 on the R&B Charts. In the UK, "Only You" was double-sided release along with "Close the Door," where it went to #41.

== Popular culture ==
- Eddie Murphy alluded to the song during his Delirious standup routine.
