= Joy (Teddy Pendergrass song) =

Song by Teddy Pendergrass

"Joy" is a 1988 song by American singer Teddy Pendergrass. It written by Reggie Calloway, Vincent Calloway and Joel Davis. The single was Teddy Pendergrass' first number one on the Black Singles chart in ten years, where it stayed for two weeks. The single was also his first solo entry on the Hot 100 in seven years. (Note: Pendergrass' previous Hot 100 hit, "Hold Me", was a duet with Whitney Houston in 1984.) "Joy" also peaked at number forty-two on the dance chart.

== See also ==
- List of number-one R&B singles of 1988 (U.S.)
