= Truly Blessed =

Studio album by Teddy Pendergrass
- Released: March 5, 1991
- Recorded: 1990–1991
- Studios: Sigma (Philadelphia, Pennsylvania); Kajem/Victory (Philadelphia, Pennsylvania); Aire Los Angeles (Glendale, California); Tarpan (San Rafael, California); High Hill (Baltimore, Maryland)
- Genre: R&B
- Length: 59:02
- Label: Elektra
- Producers: Teddy Pendergrass, Terry Price, Derek Nakamoto, Craig Burbidge,

Teddy Pendergrass chronology
Joy (1988)	Truly Blessed (1991)	A Little More Magic (1993)

Truly Blessed is the eleventh studio album by R&B singer Teddy Pendergrass, released in March 1991 on the Elektra label. The single was written by Gabriel S. Hardeman Jr, Annette Guest Hardeman Co Produced by Teddy Pendergrass. Three tracks were produced by Pendergrass, with four of the tracks produced by him and Terry Price, and the remaining three produced by Derek Nakamoto and Craig Burbidge.

Truly Blessed peaked at No. 49 on the Billboard 200 and No. 4 on the R&B chart. It spawned Pendergrass' third and last R&B chart-topping single in "It Should've Been You", and also contained two further top 40 R&B singles.

Professional ratings
Review scores
Source	Rating
AllMusic	link

== Track listing ==
No.	Title	Writer(s)	Producer(s)	Length
1.	"She Knocks Me Off My Feet"	Teddy Pendergrass; Terry Price	Pendergrass; Price; Craig Burbidge^{[a]}; Derek Nakamoto^{[a]}	4:31
2.	"It Should've Been You"	Pendergrass; Price	Pendergrass; Price; Burbidge^{[a]}; Nakamoto^{[a]}	5:24
3.	"Don't You Ever Stop"	Pendergrass; Price; Alfonso Wright	Pendergrass; Price	4:09
4.	"It's Over"	Sue Shifrin; Ken Gold	Burbidge; Nakamoto	5:43
5.	"Glad to Be Alive" (duet with Lisa Fischer)	LeRoy Bell; Casey James	Burbidge; Nakamoto; Narada Michael Walden^{[b]}	5:04
6.	"How Can You Mend a Broken Heart"	Barry Gibb; Robin Gibb	Pendergrass; Price; Burbidge^{[a]}; Nakamoto^{[a]}	5:47
7.	"I Find Everything in You"	James Rashid Carter	Pendergrass; Price; Burbidge^{[a]}; Nakamoto^{[a]}	5:06
8.	"Spend the Night"	Pendergrass; Price; Bryan Williams	Pendergrass; Price; Burbidge^{[a]}; Nakamoto^{[a]}	5:47
9.	"With You" (duet with Minnie Curry)	Carole Bayer Sager; Kenneth Ascher	Pendergrass; Price; Burbidge^{[a]}; Nakamoto^{[a]}	5:53
10.	"We Can't Keep Going On (Like This)"	Carter	Carter; Kevin Ashkins; Pendergrass; Price; Burbidge^{[a]}; Nakamoto^{[a]}	4:27
11.	"Truly Blessed"	Pendergrass; Gabriel Hardeman	Pendergrass; Price; Burbidge^{[a]}; Nakamoto^{[a]}	7:11

Notes

- ^{^[a]} denotes an additional producer
- ^{^[b]} denotes a co-producer

== Personnel ==
- Teddy Pendergrass – lead vocals
- Phyllis Yvonne – backing vocals
- Marva King – backing vocals
- Mark Philosit – backing vocals
- Michelle Kornegay – backing vocals
- Annette Hardeman – backing vocals
- Jacqueline Gregory – backing vocals
- Paula Holloway – backing vocals
- Charlene Holloway – backing vocals
- Minnie Curry – backing vocals
- Terry Price – backing vocals
- Darryl Phinnessee – backing vocals
- Dorian Holley – backing vocals
- Jim Gilstrap – backing vocals
- Julia Waters – backing vocals
- Maxine Waters – backing vocals
- Oren Waters – backing vocals
- Wendy Fraser – backing vocals
- Rosalind Keel – backing vocals
- Fred White – backing vocals
- Phyllis St. James – backing vocals
- Portia Griffin – backing vocals
- Joey Diggs – backing vocals
- Solomon Henderson Jr. – backing vocals
- Keith Jones – backing vocals
- Sheila Lakin – backing vocals
- Bridgent Potts – backing vocals
- Ron Monroe – backing vocals
- John Kee – backing vocals
- Andrea Deese – backing vocals
- Clarissa Rhodes – backing vocals
- Jeanette Taylor – backing vocals
- Randy Bowland – guitar
- Paul Jackson Jr. – guitar
- Darien Daughtry – guitar
- David Gardner – guitar
- Tim Pierce – guitar
- Andre Storey – guitar
- Richard Tucker – guitar
- Carlos Vega – drums, percussion
- Luis Conte – drums, percussion
- Steve Hopkins – drums, percussion
- Denny Fongheiser – drums, percussion
- Jim Carter – drums, percussion
- Freddy Washington – bass guitar
- Abraham Laboriel – bass guitar
- Chuckii Booker – bass guitar
- Patrick Moten – piano
- Derek Nakamoto – keyboards
- Curt Dowd – keyboards
- Bryan Williams – keyboards
- Kevin Ashkins – keyboards
- Pamela Williams – saxophone
- Gerald Albright – tenor saxophone
- Clay Jenkins – horns
- Charlie Davis – horns
- Steve Holyman – horns
- Henry McMillan Jr. – horns
- Andrew Lamb – horns
- Darnell Robinson – horns
- Louis Taylor – horns
- Marc Johnson – horns
- June Kuramoto – koto
- Basil Fung – electric stick
- Jim Salamone – drum programming
- Chilli "E" – drum programming

== Charts ==
=== Weekly charts ===
Chart (1991)	Peak position
US Billboard 200	49
US Top R&B/Hip-Hop Albums (Billboard)	4

=== Year-end charts ===
Chart (1991)	Position
US Top R&B/Hip-Hop Albums (Billboard)	33
