= Workin' It Back =

Studio album by Teddy Pendergrass
- Released: December 4, 1985
- Recorded: 1984–1985
- Genres: R&B, soul
- Length: 37:09
- Label: Asylum
- Producers: Glen Ballard; Clif Magness; Teddy Pendergrass; Linda Creed; Lonnie Jordan

Teddy Pendergrass chronology
Love Language (1984)	Workin' It Back (1985)	Joy (1988)

Singles from Workin' It Back
- 1. "Love 4/2" Released: 1985; 2. "Let Me Be Closer" Released: 1986

Workin' It Back is a studio album by the American R&B singer Teddy Pendergrass, released in 1985. It was his second record for Asylum Records. The album peaked at No. 96 on the Billboard 200 and reached No. 6 on the Top Black Albums chart. The album spawned two singles, "Love 4/2" (No. 6 R&B) and "Let Me Be Closer" (No. 67 R&B), though neither appeared on the Billboard Hot 100. The album has been certified gold by the RIAA. Pendergrass co-wrote and co-produced two of the album's songs.

== Critical reception ==
Professional ratings
Review scores
Source	Rating
AllMusic	3/5 stars
Robert Christgau	B+
The Encyclopedia of Popular Music	3/5 stars
The Philadelphia Inquirer	2/4 stars
The Rolling Stone Album Guide	3/5 stars

The Globe and Mail wrote that "the spasmodic anguish of the final cut, 'Love Emergency', is the most innovative song on the album, with the backup male chorus growling a chant over the groove as the background to Pendergrass's vocal flights." The Gazette thought that "even the Womacks can't raise a head of steam from the one-time Sound of Philadelphia."

== Track listing ==
1. "Love 4/2" (Pendergrass, James Carter, Nathaniel Lee)
2. "One of Us Fell in Love" (Adrian Baker, Eddie Seago)
3. "Never Felt Like Dancin'" (Dennis Matkosky, Monty Seward)
4. "Let Me Be Closer" (Pendergrass, Linda Creed, Dennis Matkosky, Bill Neale)
5. "Lonely Color Blue" (Cecil Womack, Linda Womack)
6. "Want You Back in My Life" (Glen Ballard, Clif Magness)
7. "Workin' It Back" (Clif Magness, Ellen Schwartz, Roger Bruno)
8. "Love Emergency" (Cecil Womack, Linda Womack)

== Personnel ==
- Teddy Pendergrass – vocals
- Ron Jennings – guitar
- Paul Jackson Jr. – guitar
- Bill Neale – guitar
- Cecil Womack – guitar, bass
- Clif Magness – guitar
- Neil Stubenhaus – bass
- Doug Grigsby – bass
- Dennis Matkosky – keyboards, synthesizer, drum programming
- Monty Seward – synthesized guitar, backing vocals
- Larry Williams – bass synthesizer
- Randy Kerber – acoustic and electric piano, Fender Rhodes, synthesizer
- Alan Pasqua – keyboards
- Eddie "Gip" Noble – keyboards
- Linda Womack – keyboards
- John Robinson – drums
- Raymond Pounds – drums
- James Gadson – drums
- Michael Mason – drum overdubs
- Paulinho da Costa – percussion
- Joel Peskin – saxophone
- Tenita Jordan – backing vocals
- Lynn Davis – backing vocals
- Shirley Jones – backing vocals
- Stephanie Reach – backing vocals
- Tammie Taylor – backing vocals
- Clydene Jackson – backing vocals
- Julia Waters – backing vocals
- Maxine Waters – backing vocals
- Vanessa Townsell – backing vocals
- The Womack Congregation – backing vocals

== Charts ==
=== Weekly charts ===
Chart (1985–1986)	Peak position
US Billboard 200	96
US Top R&B/Hip-Hop Albums (Billboard)	6

=== Year-end charts ===
Chart (1986)	Position
US Top R&B/Hip-Hop Albums (Billboard)	20
