= New Ho Queen =

New Ho Queen is a queer Asian collective based in Toronto, Canada. It was launched in May 2018 by designer John Thai, fashion stylist and queer event organizer Armand Digdoyo, filmmaker and DJ Lulu Wei, and DJ Valeroo. The group runs popular nightlife events and focuses on uplifting the Asian diaspora through food culture.
