= Close the Door (song) =

Single by Teddy Pendergrass

from the album Life Is a Song Worth Singing
- B-side: "Get Up, Get Down, Get Funky, Get Loose"
- Released: May 4, 1978
- Studio: Sigma Sound, Philadelphia, Pennsylvania
- Genre: Soul
- Length: 3:37 (Single Version); 5:25 (Album Version)
- Label: Philadelphia International Records
- Songwriter(s): Kenny Gamble, Leon Huff

Teddy Pendergrass singles chronology
"The Whole Town's Laughing at Me" (1977)	"Close the Door" (1978)	"Only You" (1978)

"Close the Door" is a hit song written by Kenny Gamble and Leon Huff. It was a hit for Teddy Pendergrass in 1978, and was released from his second solo album, Life Is a Song Worth Singing.

== Chart performance ==
The song spent two weeks at number one on the R&B chart and peaked at number twenty-five on the U.S. Billboard Hot 100. It became a gold record. In the UK, "Close the Door" was a double-sided release along with Only You, it peaked at #41.

== Samples ==
Altogether, the song has been sampled 45 times in popular music, primarily in the hip hop genre. These include:

- In 2002, R&B/hip hop soul girl group 3LW sampled Close the Door for their song "Neva Get Enuf"
- Mary J. Blige sampled the track in her song, "All Night Long" taken from her second album, My Life.
- Ayanda Jiya also sampled the track on her song "Go Go Girl".
- Rapper Keith Murray sampled the track in his song, "Get Lifted" from his 1994 debut album, The Most Beautifullest Thing in This World.

== See also ==
List of number-one R&B singles of 1978 (U.S.)
