= This One's for You (Teddy Pendergrass album) =

Studio album by Teddy Pendergrass
- Released: July 23, 1982
- Recorded: 1981–1982
- Genre: R&B, soul
- Length: 34:54
- Label: Philadelphia International
- Producer: Kenneth Gamble; Leon Huff; Gene McFadden; John Whitehead; Victor Carstarphen; John R. Faith; Thom Bell; Clarence B. Simmons; Joseph B. Jefferson; Nickolas Ashford; Valerie Simpson

Teddy Pendergrass chronology
It's Time for Love (1981)	This One's for You (1982)	Heaven Only Knows (1983)

Singles from This One's for You
- 1. "This Gift of Life / Nine Times Out of Ten" Released: April 21, 1982; 2. "I Can't Win for Losing / Don't Leave Me Out Along the Road" Released: September 13, 1982

This One's for You is an album by the American musician Teddy Pendergrass. It was released just after a bad car accident Pendergrass was involved in, which left him paralyzed from the waist down due to a spinal cord injury. The album did not do as well as his previous albums did on the Billboard 200, peaking at only No. 59, but it did do well on the R&B album chart, reaching No. 6. One single was released, "I Can't Win for Losing", which peaked at No. 32 on the R&B charts.

== Critical reception ==
The Globe and Mail wrote: "Although he occasionally gets bogged down in the big and over-syrupy Gamble-Huff production, numbers such as 'The Gift of Life' and 'This One's for You' are moving, emotive and sensually rendered ballads of the first rank."

== Track listing ==
No.	Title	Writer(s)	Length
1.	"I Can't Win for Losing"	Victor Carstarphen; Gene McFadden; John Whitehead	4:16
2.	"This One's for You"	Barry Manilow; Marty Panzer	6:18
3.	"Loving You Was Good"	LeRoy Bell; Casey James	3:35
4.	"This Gift of Life"	Kenneth Gamble; Leon Huff	4:27
5.	"Now Tell Me That You Love Me"	Kenneth Gamble; Leon Huff	5:15
6.	"It's Up to You (What You Do with Your Life)"	Kenneth Gamble; Leon Huff	5:37
7.	"Don't Leave Me Out Along the Road"	Richard Roebuck	3:34
8.	"Only to You"	Nickolas Ashford; Valerie Simpson	3:53
Total length:			34:54
