= Heaven Only Knows (album) =

Studio album by Teddy Pendergrass
- Released: October 27, 1983
- Genres: Contemporary R&B, soul
- Length: 39:56
- Label: Philadelphia International
- Producers: Kenneth Gamble; Leon Huff; Dexter Wansel; Cecil Womack; Phil Terry; Thom Bell

Teddy Pendergrass chronology
This One's for You (1982)	Heaven Only Knows (1983)	Love Language (1984)

Singles from Heaven Only Knows
- 1. "I Want My Baby Back / Judge for Yourself" Released: September 15, 1983

Heaven Only Knows is the seventh album by R&B crooner Teddy Pendergrass. It was his final studio album for Philadelphia International, released just after he left the label to record for Asylum Records. It produced one single, "I Want My Baby Back", which reached No. 61 on the Billboard R&B chart in 1984.

== Critical reception ==
Professional ratings
Review scores
Source	Rating
AllMusic	2/5 stars

The Philadelphia Inquirer noted that, "except for the gentle, eloquent 'Crazy About Your Love', these Gamble- and Huff-produced tunes are mawkish and overblown."

== Track listing ==
No.	Title	Writer(s)	Length
1.	"Crazy About Your Love"	Bobby Womack; Kenneth Gamble; Leon Huff	3:49
2.	"Judge for Yourself"	Dexter Wansel; Cynthia Biggs	5:13
3.	"I Want My Baby Back"	Bobby Womack; Kenneth Gamble	4:01
4.	"Life Is for Living"	Frank Prescott; Michael Burton; Phil Terry	4:13
5.	"You and Me for Right Now"	Victor Carstarphen; Gene McFadden; John Whitehead	3:28
6.	"Just Because You're Mine"	Gene McFadden; John Whitehead	4:55
7.	"Heaven Only Knows"	LeRoy Bell; Casey James	4:11
8.	"Don't Ever Stop (Giving Your Love to Me)"	Kenneth Gamble; Leon Huff	4:44
Total length:			34:48
