= It's Time for Love =

Studio album by Teddy Pendergrass
- Released: September 2, 1981
- Recorded: March – June 1981
- Studios: Sigma Sound (Philadelphia, Pennsylvania)
- Genres: R&B, soul
- Length: 39:56
- Label: Philadelphia International
- Producers: Kenneth Gamble; Leon Huff; Dexter Wansel; Teddy Pendergrass

Teddy Pendergrass chronology
TP (1980)	It's Time for Love (1981)	This One's for You (1982)

Singles from It's Time for Love
- 1. "I Can't Live Without Your Love / You Must Live On" Released: August 6, 1981; 2. "You're My Latest, My Greatest Inspiration / Keep On Lovin' Me" Released: October 21, 1981

Professional ratings
Review scores
Source	Rating
AllMusic	3/5 stars
The Rolling Stone Album Guide	3/5 stars

It's Time for Love is the fifth studio album by American R&B singer Teddy Pendergrass, released on September 2, 1981. It peaked at No. 19 on the Billboard 200 and No. 6 on the Top Black Albums chart. The album spawned three singles: "I Can't Live Without Your Love" (1981, peaked at No. 10 R&B), "You're My Latest, My Greatest Inspiration" (1982, No. 43 US, No. 4 R&B) and "Nine Times Out of Ten / The Gift of Love" (1982, No. 31 R&B). This was the last album released by Pendergrass before being paralyzed in a car accident the following year. The single "You're My Latest, My Greatest Inspiration" was sampled by American rapper Kendrick Lamar in 2024 for his single "Euphoria".

== Track listing ==
All tracks are written by Kenneth Gamble and Leon Huff, except where noted.

No.	Title	Length
1.	"I Can't Live Without Your Love" (Huff, Cecil Womack)	3:01
2.	"You're My Latest, My Greatest Inspiration"	5:23
3.	"Nine Times Out of Ten"	4:13
4.	"Keep On Lovin' Me" (Ken Williams)	4:38
5.	"It's Time for Love"	5:58
6.	"She's Over Me" (Barry Mann, Cynthia Weil)	3:52
7.	"I Can't Leave Your Love Alone"	4:43
8.	"You Must Live On"	3:49
Total length:		33:37

== Charts ==
Chart (1981)	Peak position
US Billboard 200	19
US Top R&B/Hip-Hop Albums (Billboard)	6

Singles

Year	Single	Peak chart positions	
Year	Single	US	US R&B
1981	"I Can't Live Without Your Love"	103	10
1981	"You're My Latest, My Greatest Inspiration"	43	4
1982	"Nine Times Out of Ten"	—	31
