= Teddy (album) =

Studio album by Teddy Pendergrass
- Released: June 23, 1979
- Recorded: 1978–1979
- Studios: Sigma Sound, Philadelphia, Pennsylvania
- Genres: R&B, soul
- Length: 41:59
- Label: Philadelphia International
- Producers: Kenny Gamble, Leon Huff, Thom Bell, Sherman Marshall, Gene McFadden, John Whitehead

Teddy Pendergrass chronology
| Life Is a Song Worth Singing (1978) | Teddy (1979) | Live! Coast to Coast (1979) |

Singles from Teddy
- 1. "Turn Off the Lights / If You Know Like I Know" Released: May 22, 1979; 2. "Come Go With Me / Do Me" Released: August 8, 1979

Teddy is the third album by the American musician Teddy Pendergrass, released in 1979.

Two singles were released from the album: "Turn Off the Lights", which reached US Pop No. 48 and No. 2 on the R&B charts, and "Come Go with Me," which reached No. 14 R&B.

The album was nominated for an American Music Award, Favorite Soul/R&B Album in 1980 and 1981.

The album cover later inspired Freddie Gibbs for the cover of his 2018 album Freddie.

== Critical reception ==
Professional ratings
Review scores
| Source | Rating |
|---|---|
| AllMusic | 4.5/5 stars |
| Christgau's Record Guide | B |
| The Rolling Stone Album Guide | 3.5/5 stars |
| The Virgin Encyclopedia of R&B and Soul | 4/5 stars |

The New York Times wrote that "Pendergrass's warmly husky baritone is in itself a most attractive instrument, and he phrases with a casual charm."

== Track listing ==
All tracks composed by Kenny Gamble and Leon Huff; except where indicated

1. "Come Go with Me"
2. "Turn Off the Lights"
3. "I'll Never See Heaven Again" (LeRoy Bell, Casey James)
4. "All I Need Is You" (Darnell Jordan, Sherman Marshall)
5. "If You Know Like I Know" (Jerry Cohen, Gene McFadden, John Whitehead)
6. "Do Me"
7. "Set Me Free" (Bell, James)
8. "Life Is a Circle"

== Personnel ==
- Teddy Pendergrass – lead and backing vocals
- Leon Huff – keyboards
- Thom Bell – keyboards, backing vocals
- Charles Collins, Keith Benson, Quinton Joseph – drums
- Bobby Eli, Dennis Harris, Roland Chambers, Tony Bell – guitar
- Bob Babbitt, Jimmy Williams – bass guitar
- Lenny Pakula – organ
- David Cruse – percussion
- Don Renaldo & His Horns and Strings – strings, horns
- Barbara Ingram, Carl Helm, Carla Benson, Evette Benton, Joseph Jefferson – backing vocals
- Jack Faith, Tony Bell, Dexter Wansel, Jerry Cohen, Larry Gold, John L. Usry Jnr., Thom Bell – arrangements

Technical

- Ed Lee – design
- Frank Laffitte – photography

== Charts ==
=== Weekly charts ===
| Chart (1979) | Peak position |
|---|---|
| US Billboard 200 | 5 |
| US Top R&B/Hip-Hop Albums (Billboard) | 1 |

=== Year-end charts ===
| Chart (1979) | Position |
|---|---|
| US Billboard 200 | 88 |
| US Top R&B/Hip-Hop Albums (Billboard) | 2 |

=== Singles ===
| Year | Single | Peak chart positions | |
| Year | Single | US | US R&B |
|---|---|---|---|
| 1979 | "Turn Off the Lights" | 48 | 2 |
| 1979 | "Come Go with Me" | — | 14 |

== See also ==
- List of Billboard number-one R&B albums of 1979
