= Teddy Pendergrass =

American soul and R&B singer-songwriter (1950–2010)

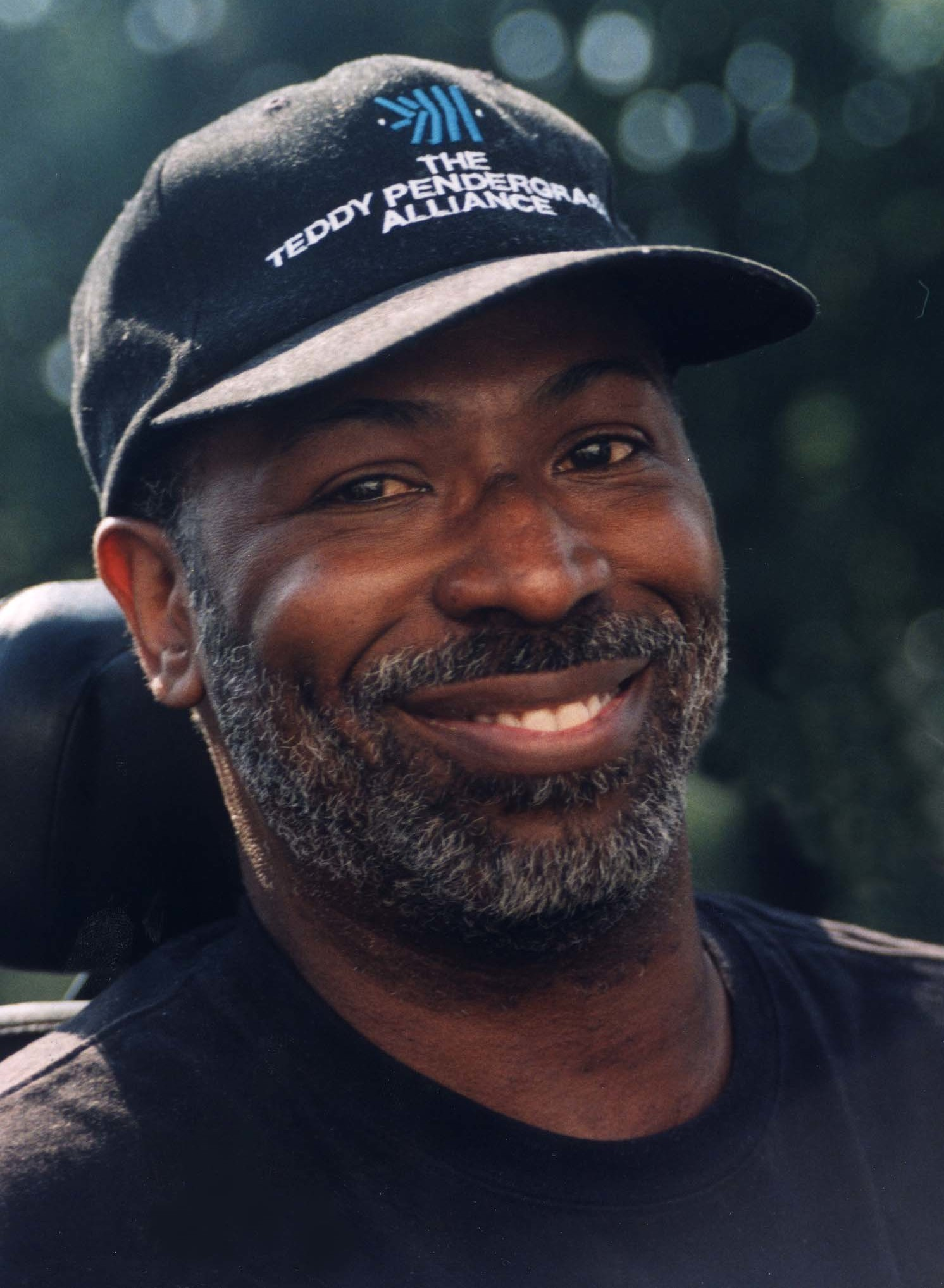
- Pendergrass in 2000

Background information
- Born: Theodore DeReese Pendergrass; March 26, 1950; Kingstree, South Carolina, U.S.
- Died: January 13, 2010 (aged 59) Bryn Mawr, Pennsylvania, U.S.
- Genres: R&B; Philadelphia soul; disco; funk
- Occupations: Singer; songwriter; composer
- Years active: 1970–2008
- Labels: Philadelphia International; Asylum; Elektra; Cleopatra; Surefire/Wind Up
- Website: teddypendergrassofficial.com

Theodore DeReese Pendergrass (March 26, 1950 – January 13, 2010) was an American soul and R&B singer and songwriter. He was born in Kingstree, South Carolina. Pendergrass lived most of his life in the Philadelphia area, and initially rose to musical fame as the lead singer of Harold Melvin & the Blue Notes. After leaving the group in 1976, Pendergrass launched a successful solo career under the Philadelphia International label, releasing five consecutive platinum albums (a record for any artist at the time).

In March 1982, a car crash left Pendergrass paralyzed from the chest down. Pendergrass continued his solo career until announcing his retirement in 2007. He died from respiratory failure in January 2010.

== Early life ==
Pendergrass was born Theodore DeReese Pendergrass on March 26, 1950, in Kingstree, South Carolina. He was the only child of Jesse and Ida Geraldine (née Epps) Pendergrass. Before his birth, Ida had experienced six miscarriages. When he was still very young, his father left the family. Years later, after his mother had promised to locate him, Pendergrass met his father at the age of 11. Shortly afterward, on June 13, 1962, Jesse Pendergrass was stabbed to death at age 47 during an altercation with another man. Pendergrass was raised in an impoverished area of North Philadelphia and frequently sang in church. He hoped to become a pastor and, according to author Robert Ewell Greene, was ordained a minister at the age of 10. During the same period, he began playing drums and also served as a junior deacon in his church.

Pendergrass attended Thomas Edison High School for Boys in North Philadelphia, where he sang with the Edison Mastersingers. He left school in the 11th grade to pursue a career in music, recording his first song, "Angel with Muddy Feet". The recording was not commercially successful. He then played drums for several local Philadelphia bands and eventually became the drummer for The Cadillacs, a group unrelated to the better-known Harlem-based act of the same name. In 1970, he was noticed by Blue Notes founder Harold Melvin (1939–1997), who persuaded him to join the group as a drummer. During one performance, however, Pendergrass began singing along, and Melvin—impressed by his voice—made him the group's lead singer. Before Pendergrass joined, the Blue Notes had struggled to achieve commercial success. That changed after the group signed with Philadelphia International Records in 1971, beginning Pendergrass's collaboration with label founders Kenny Gamble and Leon Huff.

== Early career ==
=== Harold Melvin and the Blue Notes: 1972–1975 ===
In 1972, Harold Melvin and the Blue Notes released their first single, the slow, solemn ballad, "I Miss You". The song was originally written for the Dells, but the group passed on it. Noting how Pendergrass sounded like Dells lead singer Marvin Junior, Kenny Gamble decided to build the song with Pendergrass, who was only 21 at the time of the recording. Pendergrass sings much of the song in a raspy baritone voice that would become his trademark. The song also featured Blue Notes member Lloyd Parks singing falsetto in the background and spotlighted Harold Melvin adding in a rap near the end of the song as Pendergrass kept singing, feigning tears. The song, one of Gamble and Huff's most creative productions, became a major rhythm and blues hit and put the Blue Notes on the map. The group's follow-up single, "If You Don't Know Me by Now", brought the group to the mainstream with the song reaching the top 10 of the Billboard Hot 100, while also reaching number one on the soul singles chart. Like "I Miss You" before it, the song was originally intended for a different artist, fellow Philadelphian native Patti LaBelle and her group Labelle but the group could not record it due to scheduling conflicts. Pendergrass and LaBelle developed a close friendship that would last until Pendergrass's death.

The group rode to fame with several more releases over the years including "The Love I Lost", a song that predated the upcoming disco music scene, the ballad "Hope That We Can Be Together Soon", and socially conscious singles "Wake Up Everybody" and "Bad Luck". One of the group's notable singles was their original version of the Philly soul classic "Don't Leave Me This Way", which turned into a disco smash when Motown artist Thelma Houston released her version in 1976. By 1975, Pendergrass and Harold Melvin were at odds, mainly over financial issues and personality conflicts. Despite the fact that Pendergrass sang most of the group's songs, Melvin was controlling the group's finances. At one point, Pendergrass wanted the group to be renamed "Teddy Pendergrass and the Blue Notes" since fans kept mistaking him for Melvin. Pendergrass left the group in 1975, and the Blue Notes struggled with his replacements. They eventually left Philadelphia International and toiled in relative obscurity, until Melvin's death in 1997. As of 2014, a version of the group still tours the old school circuit, performing as Harold Melvin's Blue Notes.

== Solo career ==
=== Early solo success: 1976–1981 ===
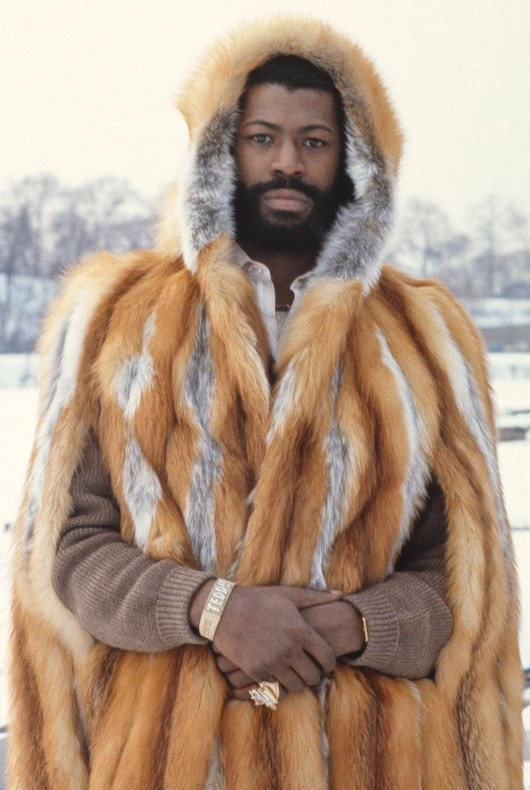
Pendergrass in 1979

In 1977, Pendergrass released his self-titled album, which went platinum on the strength of the disco hit "I Don't Love You Anymore". Its follow-up single, "The Whole Town's Laughing at Me", became a top 20 R&B hit. Although not released as singles, the uptempo album tracks "You Can't Hide from Yourself" and "The More I Get, The More I Want", as well as the ballad "And If I Had" were also hits. The debut album was quickly followed by Life Is a Song Worth Singing, in 1978. That album was even more successful with its singles "Only You" and the million selling number 1 R&B hit "Close the Door". The latter song firmly established Pendergrass as the top male sex symbol in soul music. The album's popularity was furthered by the disco hit "Get Up, Get Down, Get Funky, Get Loose", the ballad "It Don't Hurt Now", and the mid-tempo classic "When Somebody Loves You Back".

Pendergrass followed up his double platinum number-one R&B triumph with two successes in 1979, the albums Teddy (which stayed at number 1 on the Billboard R&B chart for eight weeks and was named the second-biggest R&B album of the year), and the live release Live Coast to Coast. Hits off Teddy included the songs "Come Go with Me", the erotic ballad "Turn Off the Lights", and the uptempo album cut "Do Me". With his sex appeal at an all-time high after his 1979 tour, Pendergrass took a more mellow approach on his 1980 album TP. It included the classic number two R&B hit "Love T.K.O.", the Stephanie Mills duet version of "Feel the Fire" and the Ashford & Simpson composition "Is It Still Good to You".

Pendergrass's popularity became massive at the end of 1978. With sold-out audiences packing his shows, his manager, Shep Gordon, who was known for his innovative approaches to publicizing his artists, soon noticed that a huge number of his audience consisted of women of all races. Gordon devised a plan for Pendergrass's next tour to play to just female audiences, starting a trend that continues today called "women-only concerts". In 1980, the Isley Brothers released "Don't Say Goodnight (It's Time for Love)" to compete with Pendergrass's "Turn Off the Lights", which sensed Pendergrass's influence on the quiet storm format of black music.

=== Car crash: 1982 ===
On March 18, 1982, in the East Falls section of Philadelphia on Lincoln Drive near Rittenhouse Street, Pendergrass was involved in a car crash while driving his new Rolls-Royce Silver Spirit. The singer's license had been suspended for unpaid parking tickets, and he had also wrecked a Maserati the previous week. Rumors that alcohol was a factor were later discounted by the police.

Pendergrass was reportedly driving Tenika Watson, a transgender nightclub performer whom he had known since the 1970s, to her house. Pendergrass would only say that Watson was a casual acquaintance. Watson believed the cause of the crash was a mechanical error in the car, and raised the possibility someone had tampered with the brakes. The car hit a guard rail, crossed onto the oncoming lane, and hit two trees. No other vehicles were involved. The impact jammed the doors, trapping Pendergrass and Watson for almost an hour until both were freed.

While Watson walked away from the collision with minor injuries, Pendergrass had a spinal cord injury, leaving him a tetraplegic, paralyzed from the chest down; Pendergrass never walked again. He lost the use of the intercostal muscles between the ribs that helped him breathe which impacted his ability to sing. Dr. Robert Sataloff created a special vest for him that compressed his chest and restored breath support to enable him to resume singing with success.

=== Later solo career: 1983–2008 ===
Pendergrass received well-wishes from thousands of his fans during his recovery. In August 1982, Philadelphia International released This One's for You, which failed to chart successfully, as did 1983's Heaven Only Knows. Both albums included material Pendergrass had recorded before the crash. The albums completed his contract with Philadelphia International. By the time Pendergrass decided to return to the studio to work on new music, he had struggled to find a recording deal. Eventually signing a contract with Asylum Records and completing physical therapy, Pendergrass released Love Language in 1984. The album included the pop ballad "Hold Me", featuring a young Whitney Houston on her first release as a professional artist; the song became a hit rising to the top ten of both the R&B and AC charts and peaking inside the top 50 of the Billboard Hot 100; Pendergrass' first appearance in over two years. As a result of that success, Love Language reached number 38 on the Billboard album chart and was certified Gold by the Recording Industry Association of America (RIAA).

On July 13, 1985, Pendergrass made an emotional return to the stage at the historic Live Aid concert in Philadelphia in front of a live audience of over 100,000, the concert having an estimated 1.5 billion television viewers. It was his first live performance following the accident. Pendergrass tearfully thanked the audience for keeping him in their well-wishes and then performed the Diana Ross song "Reach Out and Touch (Somebody's Hand)". In 1988, Pendergrass scored his first R&B number-one hit in nearly a decade when the song "Joy", from his album of the same name, was released. A video of the song enjoyed heavy rotation on Black Entertainment Television (BET). It was also his final Hot 100 charted single, peaking at number 77. The album was certified Gold by the RIAA that same year. Pendergrass' voice was also heard on the jingles of a then local Philadelphia radio station, WSNI-FM. He kept recording through the 1990s. One of the singer's last hits was the new jack swing song, "Believe in Love", released in 1994. In 1996, Pendergrass starred alongside Stephanie Mills in the touring production of the gospel musical Your Arms Too Short to Box with God. In 1998, he released his autobiography titled Truly Blessed.

Pendergrass performed at a concert, titled "The Power of Love", at the Wiltern Theater in Los Angeles on February 14, 2002. The concert became the album From Teddy, With Love, which was released on the Razor & Tie record label later that year. It was his second (after Live! Coast to Coast) and final live album. Clips of the concert, in particular his performance of his comeback song "Joy" can be seen on YouTube. In later years, "Wake Up Everybody", on which Pendergrass was lead vocalist on the 1975 Harold Melvin & The Blue Notes hit, was covered by a diverse range of acts from Simply Red to Patti LaBelle and was chosen as a rallying cry during the 2004 Presidential campaign by Kenneth "Babyface" Edmonds to mobilize voters. Additionally, Little Brother, Kanye West, Cam'ron, Twista, Ghostface, Tyrese Gibson, 9th Wonder, DMX and DJ Green Lantern have utilized his solo work.

In 2006, Pendergrass announced his retirement from the music business. In 2007, he briefly returned to performing to participate in Teddy 25: A Celebration of Life, Hope & Possibilities, a 25th anniversary awards ceremony that marked Pendergrass's crash, but also raised money for his charity, The Teddy Pendergrass Alliance, and honored those who helped Pendergrass since the accident.

== Personal life and death ==
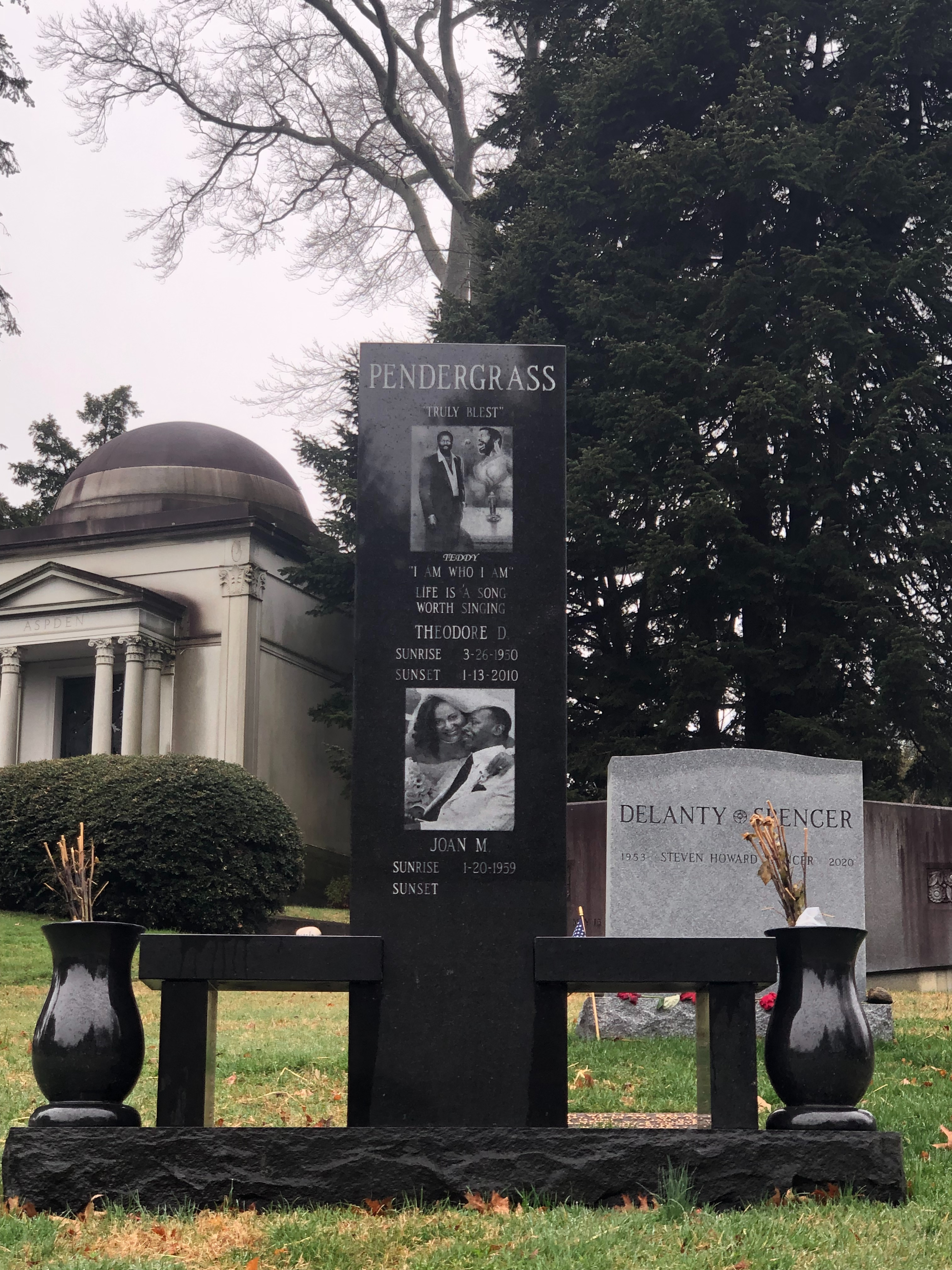
Grave of Teddy Pendergrass at West Laurel Hill Cemetery

Pendergrass had three children: Tisha, LaDonna, and Theodore Jr.

Pendergrass's manager and girlfriend Taazmayia "Taaz" Lang was shot dead on the doorstep of her home in April 1977. The murder remains unsolved, although Philadelphia's Black Mafia has been suspected, as they allegedly resented Lang's control over Pendergrass's lucrative career.

In June 1987, Pendergrass married a former Philadanco dancer named Karen Still, who had also danced in his shows. They divorced in 2002.

Pendergrass published his autobiography, Truly Blessed, with Patricia Romanowski in 1998.

In early 2006, Pendergrass met Joan Williams. He proposed to her after four months, and they married in a private ceremony officiated by his pastor, Alyn Waller of Enon Tabernacle Baptist Church, on Easter Sunday, March 23, 2008. On September 6, a formal wedding was celebrated at The Ocean Cliff Resort in Newport, Rhode Island. As members of Enon Tabernacle Baptist Church, Joan Pendergrass set up The Enon Tabernacle Baptist Church Youth Fund in the name of Pendergrass to provide assistance and a center for Philadelphia's inner city youth.

On June 5, 2009, Pendergrass underwent successful surgery for colon cancer and returned home to recover. A few weeks later, he returned to the hospital with respiratory issues. After seven months, Pendergrass died of respiratory failure on January 13, 2010, with his wife Joan by his side, at Bryn Mawr Hospital in Bryn Mawr, Pennsylvania. He was 59 years old. Pendergrass' body was interred at the West Laurel Hill Cemetery in Bala Cynwyd, Pennsylvania.

As of 2015, there were plans to make a feature film biopic of Pendergrass' life, and Tyrese Gibson was set to star as the late singer. In 2019, Essence Magazine reported that Gibson reached out to Lee Daniels to produce the film.

In 2019, BBC Film made a documentary on Pendergrass's life titled If You Don't Know Me. It was released on Showtime on February 8.

== Discography ==
Studio albums

- Teddy Pendergrass (1977)
- Life Is a Song Worth Singing (1978)
- Teddy (1979)
- TP (1980)
- It's Time for Love (1981)
- This One's for You (1982)
- Heaven Only Knows (1983)
- Love Language (1984)
- Workin' It Back (1985)
- Joy (1988)
- Truly Blessed (1991)
- A Little More Magic (1993)
- You and I (1997)
- This Christmas (I'd Rather Have Love) (1998)

== Awards ==
=== Grammy Awards ===
Year	Category	Nominated work	Result	Ref.
1979	Best Male R&B Vocal Performance	"Close the Door"	Nominated	
1982	Best Male R&B Vocal Performance	"I Can't Live Without Your Love"	Nominated	
1989	Best Male R&B Vocal Performance	Joy	Nominated	
1992	Best Male R&B Vocal Performance	"How Can You Mend a Broken Heart"	Nominated	
1994	Best Male R&B Vocal Performance	"Voodoo"	Nominated	

=== Other awards ===
Pendergrass received several nominations for the American Music Awards between 1979 and 1981 for Favorite Soul/R&B Male Artist, Favorite Soul/R&B Album, and Favorite Disco Artist. He won the AMA for Favorite Soul/R&B Male Artist in 1979, tied with singer Lou Rawls. Pendergrass was posthumously inducted into the National Rhythm & Blues Hall of Fame class of 2021. In 2023, Rolling Stone ranked Pendergrass at No. 42 on its list of the 200 Greatest Singers of All Time.
