= Tighten Up =

Tighten Up may refer to:

- Tighten Up (Archie Bell & the Drells album), 1968 album
  - "Tighten Up" (Archie Bell & the Drells song), the album's title song
- Tighten Up, a 1968 album by Benny Gordon and the Soul Brothers
- "Tighten Up" (Electronic song), a 1991 song
- "Tighten Up" (The Black Keys song), a 2010 song
- Tighten Up, a 1960s series of reggae compilation albums issued by Trojan Records
- "The Tighten Up", a 2012 song by Moka Only from the album Airport 6

== See also ==
- Tighten Up Vol. 88, an album by Big Audio Dynamite
