= Dance Your Troubles Away =

Studio album by Archie Bell & the Drells
- Released: 1975
- Recorded: 1975
- Studios: Sigma Sound, Philadelphia, Pennsylvania
- Genre: Soul
- Length: 36:23
- Label: TSOP PZ 33844
- Producers: Bunny Sigler, Gene McFadden, John Whitehead, Kenneth Gamble, Leon Huff, Victor Carstarphen

Archie Bell & the Drells chronology
There's Gonna Be a Showdown (1969)	Dance Your Troubles Away (1975)	Where Will You Go When the Party's Over (1977)

Professional ratings
Review scores
Source	Rating
AllMusic	3/5 stars
The Rolling Stone Record Guide	3/5 stars

Dance Your Troubles Away is a 1975 studio album by the American band Archie Bell & the Drells, released by the record label TSOP Records and recorded at Sigma Sound Studios in Philadelphia, Pennsylvania.

== Track listing ==
1. "Let's Groove" (Leon Huff, Gene McFadden, John Whitehead, Victor Carstarphen) - 6:04
2. "I Could Dance All Night" (Allan Felder, Bunny Sigler, Ron Tyson) - 2:34
3. "I Won't Leave You Honey, Never" (Bunny Sigler, Ron Tyson) - 9:02
4. "Dance Your Troubles Away" (Gene McFadden, John Whitehead, Victor Carstarphen) - 6:21
5. "The Soul City Walk" (Gene McFadden, John Whitehead, Victor Carstarphen) - 4:22
6. "Let's Go Disco" (Cary Gilbert, Leon Huff, Gene McFadden, John Whitehead, Victor Carstarphen) - 3:46
7. "I Love You but You Don't Even Know It" (Gene McFadden, John Whitehead, Victor Carstarphen) - 4:05

== Personnel ==
Musicians

- Archie Bell, James Wise, Lee Bell, Willie Pernell – vocals
- Barbara Ingram, Carla Benson, Evette Benton – backing vocals (uncredited)

The Melting Pot Band

- McNasty McKnight – trombone
- Don Pope, Tony Salvaggio – saxophones
- Lonnie LaLanne, Calvin Owens – trumpets
- Abel Salazar – keyboards
- Mike Hughes – drums

Technical

- Bunny Sigler, Gene McFadden, John Whitehead, Kenneth Gamble, Leon Huff, Victor Carstarphen – producers
- Jay Mark, Jim Gallagher, Joe Tarsla, Kenny Present – engineers
- Al Clayton – photography
- Gerard Huerta – design
