= Rusk County Expo Center =

Arena in Henderson, Texas, U.S.

- Interactive map of Rusk County Expo Center
- Location: 3303 FM 13 West, Henderson, Texas 75652
- Coordinates: 32.14852°N 94.85093°W
- Capacity: 4,700 owner = Rusk County, Texas

Construction
- Opened: 1995
- Cost: $3.2 million

The Rusk County Expo Center is a 4,700-seat multi-purpose arena in Henderson, Texas. Built in 1995 at a cost of $3.2 million, it hosts various livestock-related and other events.

In 2015, it was announced as the home of the Pineywoods Bucks of American Indoor Football for 2016, however, the team appears to have folded prior to ever fielding a team.
