= Major Lance's Greatest Hits Recorded Live at the Torch =

Live album by Major Lance
- Released: 1973
- Recorded: Stoke-on Trent 1972
- Genre: Soul
- Label: Contempo; COLP1001
- Producer: Major Lance

Major Lance chronology
Um, Um, Um, Um, Um, Um - The Best of Major Lance (1964)	Major Lance's Greatest Hits Recorded Live at the Torch (1973)	Now Arriving (1978)

Professional ratings
Review scores
Source	Rating
AllMusic	2/5 stars
The Encyclopedia of Popular Music	2/5 stars

Major Lance's Greatest Hits Recorded Live at the Torch is an album by the soul artist Major Lance, released in 1973 on Contempo Records. It was recorded live in front of a sell-out audience at the Torch, Tunstall, Stoke-On-Trent, on 9 December 1972 and has been described as "perhaps the best Northern soul album ever made", and "a one-off gig when everything came together in perfect harmony".

== Track listing ==
No.	Title	Writer(s)	Length
1.	"Hey, Hey"	Major Lance
2.	"I Wanna Make Up, (Before We Break Up)"	Arthur Snyder
3.	"My Girl"	Smokey Robinson, Ronald White
4.	"Um, Um, Um, Um, Um, Um"	Curtis Mayfield
5.	"The Beat"	Dan Penn, Del Sharh, Ricky Castel, Roscoe Johnston
6.	"Ain't No Soul (Left in These Old Shoes)"	Arthur Resnick, Joey Levine
7.	"Investigate"	Cliff Thomas, Edward Thomas
8.	"Monkey Time"	Curtis Mayfield
