= List of Best Selling Rhythm & Blues Singles number ones of 1968 =

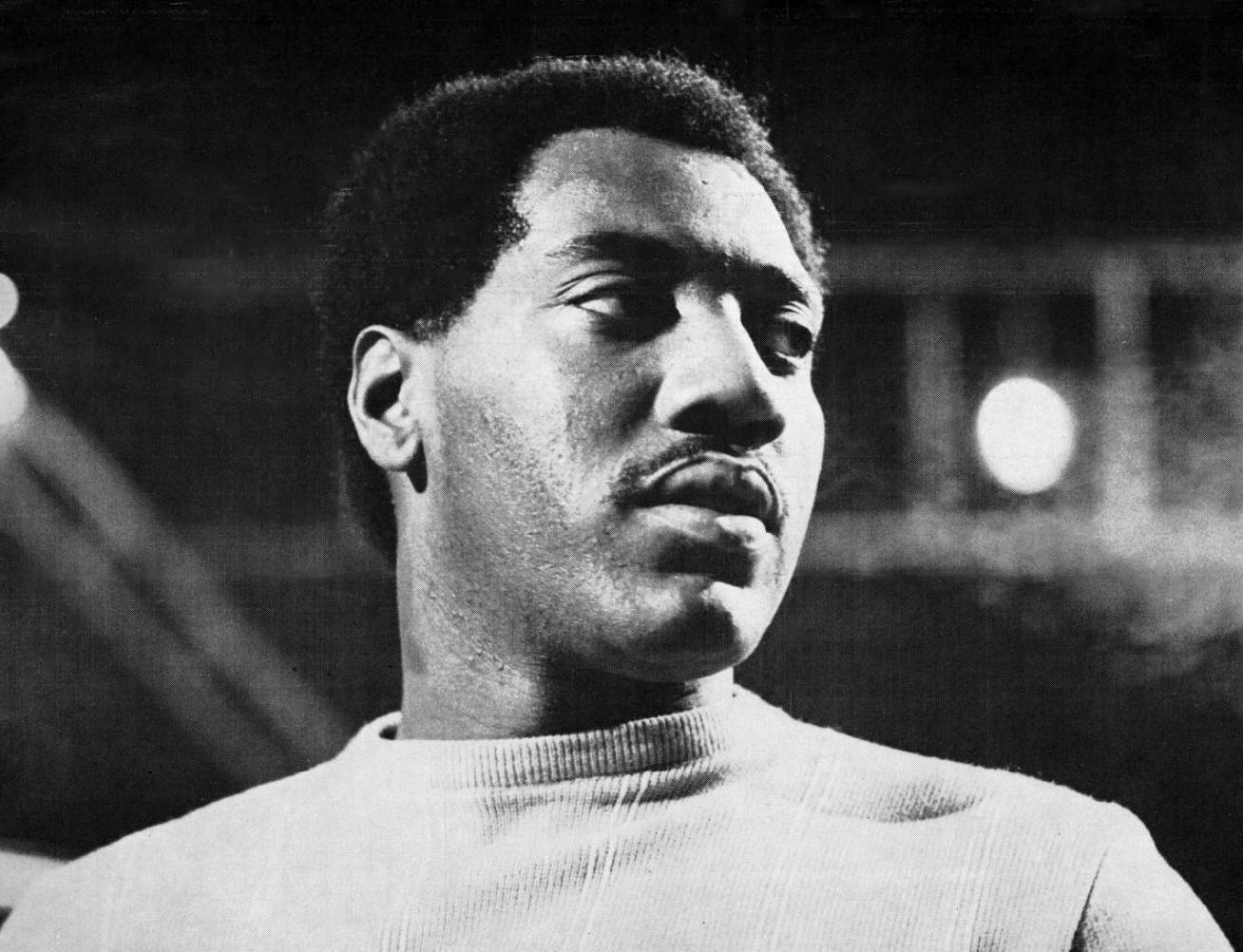
Otis Redding had a posthumous number one with "(Sittin' on) the Dock of the Bay".

In 1968, Billboard published a weekly chart ranking the top-performing singles in the United States in rhythm and blues (R&B) and related African American-oriented music genres; the chart has undergone various name changes over the decades to reflect the evolution of such genres and since 2005 has been published as Hot R&B/Hip-Hop Songs. It was published under the title Top Selling R&B Singles in the issue dated January 6, 1968, Best Selling R&B Singles through the issue dated March 30, and Best Selling Rhythm & Blues Singles thereafter; during the year, 20 different singles topped the chart.

Unusually, the year started and ended with different versions of the same song at number one. In the issue of Billboard dated January 6, Gladys Knight & the Pips were at number one with "I Heard It Through the Grapevine", the song's sixth week in the top spot. In December, Marvin Gaye's version of the song reached number one and held the peak position for the final three weeks of the year. Gaye had actually recorded his version before Knight recorded hers, but Berry Gordy, owner of the Motown record label, refused to allow it to be released. After Knight's version became a success, Gaye's version was included on his album In the Groove and was released as a single by popular demand. It ultimately outperformed Knight's version, becoming Motown's biggest-selling single to date, and has come to be regarded as the definitive version of the song. It was Gaye's third chart-topper of 1968, following "Ain't Nothing Like the Real Thing" and "You're All I Need to Get By", both duets with Tammi Terrell.

In March, Otis Redding reached number one with his song "(Sittin' on) the Dock of the Bay", which spent three weeks in the top spot. Redding had died in a plane crash in December of the previous year just days after recording the track, which in addition to topping the R&B listing became the first posthumous number one on the all-genre Hot 100 chart. "Tighten Up" by Archie Bell & the Drells, "Grazing in the Grass" by Hugh Masekela and Gaye's version of "I Heard It Through the Grapevine" also topped both charts in 1968. Redding, Bell & the Drells and Masekela all topped the R&B chart in 1968 for the first time, as did Tammi Terell, the Intruders, the Dells and Johnnie Taylor. The Dells were inducted into the Rock and Roll Hall of Fame in recognition of their long and successful career, and the Intruders are considered to have been an early influence on the Philadelphia soul sound, which grew in prominence in the 1970s.

== Chart history ==
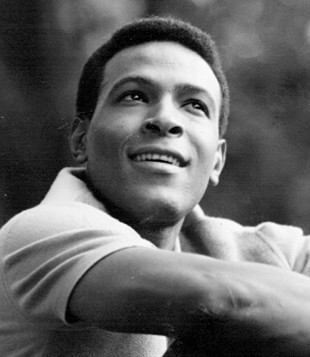
Marvin Gaye had three number ones ("Ain't Nothing Like the Real Thing", "You're All I Need to Get By" and "I Heard It Through the Grapevine") in 1968, two of them duets with Tammi Terrell.

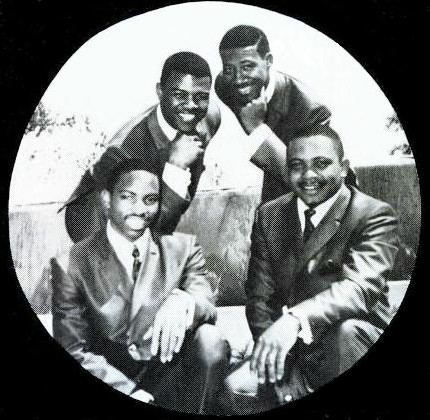
"Tighten Up" was a chart-topper for Archie Bell & the Drells.

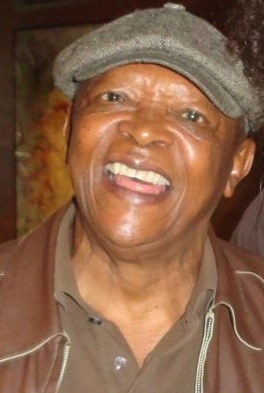
South African trumpeter Hugh Masakela (pictured in 2013) topped the chart with "Grazing in the Grass".

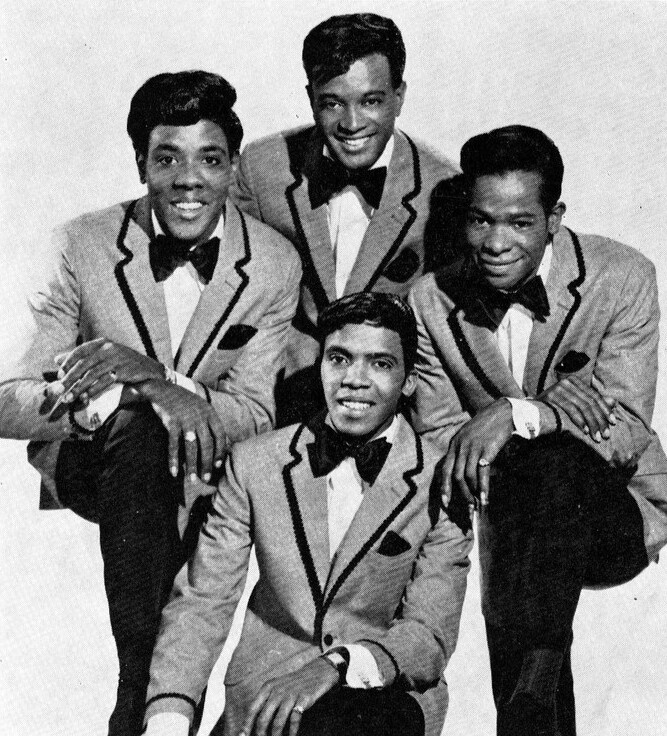
The Intruders were an early influence on the Philadelphia soul sound. Their single "Cowboys to Girls" topped the chart for a week.

Key
| † | Indicates best-charting R&B single of 1968 |

Chart history
| Issue date | Title | Artist(s) | Ref. |
|---|---|---|---|
| January 6 | "I Heard It Through the Grapevine" | Gladys Knight & the Pips | |
| January 13 | "I Second That Emotion" | Smokey Robinson & the Miracles | |
| January 20 | "Chain of Fools" | Aretha Franklin | |
| January 27 | "Chain of Fools" | Aretha Franklin | |
| February 3 | "Chain of Fools" | Aretha Franklin | |
| February 10 | "Chain of Fools" | Aretha Franklin | |
| February 17 | "I Wish It Would Rain" | The Temptations | |
| February 24 | "I Wish It Would Rain" | The Temptations | |
| March 2 | "I Wish It Would Rain" | The Temptations | |
| March 9 | "We're a Winner" | The Impressions | |
| March 16 | "(Sittin' on) the Dock of the Bay" | Otis Redding | |
| March 23 | "(Sittin' on) the Dock of the Bay" | Otis Redding | |
| March 30 | "(Sittin' on) the Dock of the Bay" | Otis Redding | |
| April 6 | "(Sweet Sweet Baby) Since You've Been Gone" | Aretha Franklin | |
| April 13 | "(Sweet Sweet Baby) Since You've Been Gone" | Aretha Franklin | |
| April 20 | "(Sweet Sweet Baby) Since You've Been Gone" | Aretha Franklin | |
| April 27 | "I Got the Feelin'" | James Brown | |
| May 4 | "I Got the Feelin'" | James Brown | |
| May 11 | "Cowboys to Girls" | The Intruders | |
| May 18 | "Tighten Up" | Archie Bell & the Drells | |
| May 25 | "Tighten Up" | Archie Bell & the Drells | |
| June 1 | "Shoo-Be-Doo-Be-Doo-Da-Day" | Stevie Wonder | |
| June 8 | "Ain't Nothing Like the Real Thing" | Marvin Gaye and Tammi Terrell | |
| June 15 | "Think" | Aretha Franklin | |
| June 22 | "Think" | Aretha Franklin | |
| June 29 | "Think" | Aretha Franklin | |
| July 6 | "I Could Never Love Another (After Loving You)" | The Temptations | |
| July 13 | "Grazing in the Grass" | Hugh Masekela | |
| July 20 | "Grazing in the Grass" | Hugh Masekela | |
| July 27 | "Grazing in the Grass" | Hugh Masekela | |
| August 3 | "Grazing in the Grass" | Hugh Masekela | |
| August 10 | "Stay in My Corner" | The Dells | |
| August 17 | "Stay in My Corner" | The Dells | |
| August 24 | "Stay in My Corner" | The Dells | |
| August 31 | "You're All I Need to Get By" | Marvin Gaye and Tammi Terrell | |
| September 7 | "You're All I Need to Get By" | Marvin Gaye and Tammi Terrell | |
| September 14 | "You're All I Need to Get By" | Marvin Gaye and Tammi Terrell | |
| September 21 | "You're All I Need to Get By" | Marvin Gaye and Tammi Terrell | |
| September 28 | "You're All I Need to Get By" | Marvin Gaye and Tammi Terrell | |
| October 5 | "Say It Loud - I'm Black and I'm Proud (Part 1)" † | James Brown | |
| October 12 | "Say It Loud - I'm Black and I'm Proud (Part 1)" † | James Brown | |
| October 19 | "Say It Loud - I'm Black and I'm Proud (Part 1)" † | James Brown | |
| October 26 | "Say It Loud - I'm Black and I'm Proud (Part 1)" † | James Brown | |
| November 2 | "Say It Loud - I'm Black and I'm Proud (Part 1)" † | James Brown | |
| November 9 | "Say It Loud - I'm Black and I'm Proud (Part 1)" † | James Brown | |
| November 16 | "Hey, Western Union Man" | Jerry Butler | |
| November 23 | "Who's Making Love" | Johnnie Taylor | |
| November 30 | "Who's Making Love" | Johnnie Taylor | |
| December 7 | "Who's Making Love" | Johnnie Taylor | |
| December 14 | "I Heard It Through the Grapevine" | Marvin Gaye | |
| December 21 | "I Heard It Through the Grapevine" | Marvin Gaye | |
| December 28 | "I Heard It Through the Grapevine" | Marvin Gaye | |
