= Howard-Dickinson House =

Historic house in Texas

Coordinates: 32°08′57″N 94°47′57″W

The Howard-Dickinson House was built in 1855 and is located at 501 South Main in Henderson, Texas. This house was the first brick home built in Rusk County, Texas, and is in the Italianate architecture style. In 1968, the Howard-Dickinson House was presented a Texas Historical Medallion and was recorded as a Texas Historic Landmark.

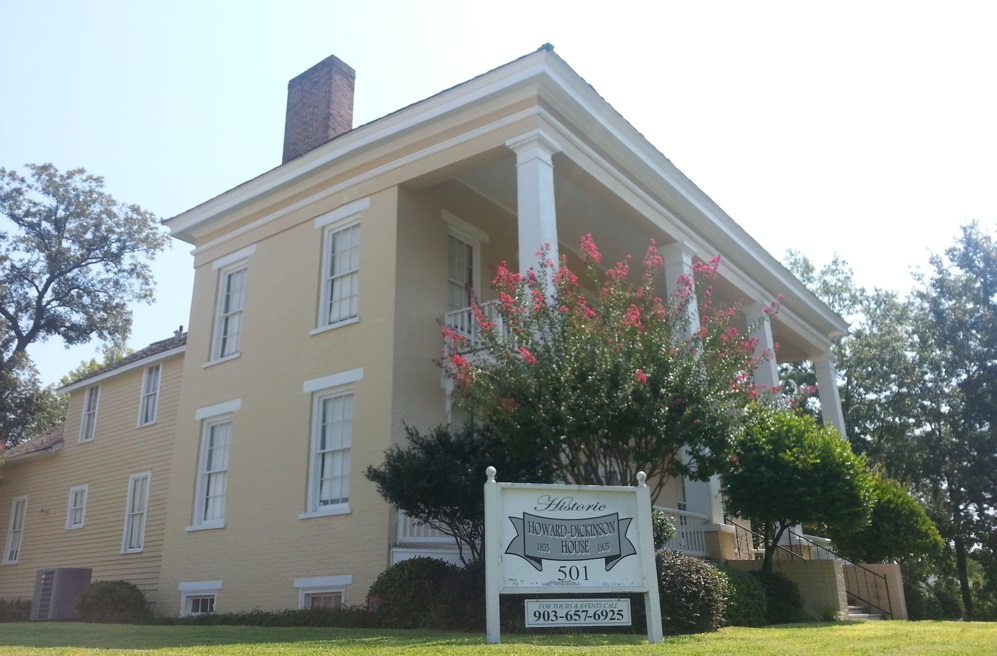
Howard-Dickinson House, Henderson, TX

James Logan Howard and Dave P. Howard, brothers from Virginia, built the home and lived there for 50 years. Dave Howard, his wife Martha, their 9 children, and Dave’s bachelor brother Logan Howard lived in the house. At that time, the Howard brothers were well-known brick makers and carpenters in Henderson. They manufactured the bricks at the back of the house, and many of the houses still standing in Henderson were built from these bricks.

Sam Houston, the first president of the Republic of Texas, was a frequent visitor to the house. He was a cousin to Martha Howard. Houston's campaign trunk is displayed in the house.

Mrs. Katie Dickinson purchased the home in 1905 and the Dickinson family lived there for about 50 years. During this time, they added the two-story wing located in the rear of the home. This section of the home was used in the 1930s as a boarding house for workers during the East Texas oil boom.

By the 1960s, the house was in need of repair and was given by then-owner businessman Homer Bryce to the Rusk County Heritage Association, a group formed to save the house. In 1967, after much fund-raising and restoration work, the house was opened to the public as a living museum and meeting place for special events. Ghost tours are also given in the home.
