= There's Gonna Be a Showdown =

Studio album by Archie Bell & the Drells
- Released: 1969
- Genres: Funk, soul, R&B
- Label: Atlantic
- Producers: Kenneth Gamble, Leon Huff, L.J.F. Productions

Archie Bell & the Drells chronology
I Can't Stop Dancing (1968)	There's Gonna Be a Showdown (1969)	Dance Your Troubles Away (1976)

Professional ratings
Review scores
Source	Rating
Allmusic	4/5 stars

There's Gonna Be a Showdown is a 1969 album by American funk band Archie Bell & the Drells, released by the record label Atlantic.

== Background ==
It was their last album released on Atlantic, and preceded a six-year gap before the recording of its follow-up, Dance Your Troubles Away, which appeared on producers Kenny Gamble and Leon Huff's own label, Philadelphia International.

== Chart performance ==
The album peaked at No. 163 on the Billboard Top LPs, during a three-week run on the chart.

== Track listing ==
1. "I Love My Baby" (Kenneth Gamble, Thom Bell)
2. "Houston Texas" (Bobby Martin, Kenneth Gamble, Thom Bell)
3. "(There's Gonna Be A) Showdown" (Kenneth Gamble, Leon Huff)
4. "Giving Up Dancing" (Bobby Martin, Kenneth Gamble, Thom Bell)
5. "Girl You're Too Young" (Archie Bell, Kenneth Gamble, Thom Bell)
6. "Mama Didn't Teach Me That Way" (Archie Bell)
7. "Do the Handjive" (Kenneth Gamble, Thom Bell)
8. "My Balloon's Going Up" (Kenneth Gamble, Leon Huff)
9. "Here I Go Again" (Kenneth Gamble, Leon Huff)
10. "Go for What You Know" (Melvin Steals, Mervin Steals)
11. "Green Power" (Melvin Steals, Mervin Steals)
12. "Just a Little Closer" (Archie Bell)

== Charts ==
Chart (1969)	Peak position
US Billboard Top LPs	163
