= The Monkey Time =

Single by Major Lance

from the album The Monkey Time
- B-side: "Mama Didn't Know"
- Released: 1963
- Genre: R&B
- Length: 2:46
- Label: Okeh
- Songwriter: Curtis Mayfield
- Producer: Carl Davis

Major Lance singles chronology
"Delilah" (1963)	"The Monkey Time" (1963)	"Hey Little Girl" (1963)

"The Monkey Time" is a song written by Curtis Mayfield and performed by Major Lance. It reached No. 2 on the U.S. R&B chart, No. 8 on the U.S. pop chart, and No. 32 in Canada in 1963. It was featured on his 1963 album The Monkey Time, was arranged by Johnny Pate and produced by Carl Davis.

The track ranked No. 49 on Billboard magazine's Top 100 singles of 1963.

== Other charting versions ==
- The Tubes released their take on the song as a single in 1983 which reached No. 16 on the U.S. rock chart and No. 68 on U.S. pop chart. It was featured on their album Outside Inside.

== Other versions ==
- The Miracles - on their 1963 album The Miracles Doin' Mickey's Monkey.
- Georgie Fame - on his 1964 album Fame at Last.
- Gene Barge - on his 1965 album Dance with Daddy "G".
- Archie Bell & the Drells, - on their 1968 album I Can't Stop Dancing.
- The Mad Lads released a version, entitled "Monkey Time '69" on their 1969 album The Mad, Mad, Mad, Mad, Mad Lads.
- Laura Nyro and Labelle - as a medley with "Dancing in the Street", on their 1971 album Gonna Take a Miracle.
- Al Kooper - on his 1972 album A Possible Projection of the Future / Childhood's End. Kooper also released it as a single the same year, but it did not chart.
- Johnny Rivers - on his 1977 album Outside Help.
- Jimmy Burns - on his 1999 album Night Time Again.
- The Action - on their 2004 compilation album Uptight and Outasight.
- The Velvelettes - on their 2004 compilation album The Velvelettes: The Motown Anthology.
