= James Smith (Texas general) =

General in the Texas Revolutionary Army, 1792–1885

- Born: September 10, 1792; South Carolina
- Died: December 25, 1855 (aged 63)
- Burial place: Smith Park, Henderson, Texas
- Military career
- Allegiance: Texas
- Rank: General
- Conflicts: Creek War, War of 1812; Battle of the Neches; Battle of San Jacinto

James Smith (September 10, 1792 – December 25, 1855) was a General in the Texas Revolutionary Army.

== Biography ==
Smith was born in Spartanburg County, South Carolina, on September 10, 1792. He served in the War of 1812, the Creek Indian Wars, and served as a lieutenant under Andrew Jackson in the Battle of New Orleans. From 1819 until 1835, he fought in the Tennessee militia alongside Sam Houston, where he reached the rank of Colonel. In 1835, he moved to Texas, where he established a plantation in Nacogdoches, Texas. On April 11, 1836, Smith joined the revolutionary army as captain of the cavalry of the Nacogdoches Mounted Volunteers. After his victory at the Battle of San Jacinto, he received a promotion to inspector general by General Thomas J. Rusk.

Smith commanded the second battalion of Rusk's regiments at the Battle of the Neches. On March 7, 1840, he was promoted to brigadier general, where he took command of the Third Brigade on the northwest frontier of Mexico.

Smith represented Rusk County, Texas in the Texas House of Representatives from February 16, 1846, until December 13, 1847. He was instrumental in the establishment of Smith County, Texas, named in his honor. Smith also donated the land that Henderson, Texas was built on.

Smith is buried at Smith Park, on the corner of S. Main St. and Jacksonville Dr., in Henderson, Texas.

== Family ==
With wife: Hannah Parker (1799–1864), children:

1. Captain Henry Madison Smith (1817–1882)
2. Sarah Elvina Smith (1818–1902)
3. Unnamed Female? (~1820)
4. Frances E. Smith (1823–1854)
5. James Smith (Birth date unknown)
6. Joseph Smith (1825–1860)
7. Andrew Jackson Smith (1826–1880)
8. Isaac Newton Smith (1828-1886)
9. William Jasper Smith (1830–1894)
10. Francis Marion Smith (1833–1863)
11. Barsheba H. Smith (1834–1904)
12. Sam Houston Smith (Birth date unknown)
13. Birt H. Smith (1837–1863)
