= Archie Bell (singer) =

American singer-songwriter (born 1944)

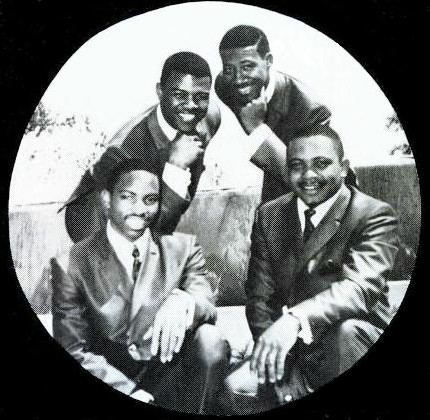
- Archie Bell (lower right)

Background information
- Born: Archie Lee Bell; September 1, 1944 (age 81); Henderson, Texas, U.S.
- Genres: Soul, funk, blues, country
- Occupations: Musician, songwriter
- Instrument: Vocals
- Years active: 1961–present

Archie Lee Bell (born September 1, 1944) is an American solo singer and former lead singer of Archie Bell & the Drells.

== Background ==
Born to African-American parents Langston and Ruthie Bell in Henderson, Texas, United States, Archie is the second oldest of seven brothers, including USC and NFL football player Ricky Bell and Jerry Bell, a former world karate champion and singer in the bands New Birth and the Dazz Band. He also is related to the record producer, Thom Bell.

== Career ==
Bell was singing in Houston night clubs at age ten, and credits seeing the performances of Jackie Wilson and Sam Cooke as influencing him to become a singer. He formed the Drells in 1956 while in junior high school.

Bell became known around the world for the hit that he had with the Drells, "Tighten Up". He has pursued a solo career since the breakup of the Drells in 1980. Bell later released one solo album (I Never Had It So Good – 1981) on Beckett Records and continued to perform with The Drells off and on for the next twenty years. During the 1990s the line-up also included Steve "Stevie G." Guettler (guitar, vocals), Jeff "JT" Strickler (bass guitar, vocals), Steve Farrell (guitar, vocals), Mike Wilson (keyboards, vocals) and Wes Armstrong (drums, vocals) of the Atlanta-based group The Rockerz.

In more recent times Bell has been diversifying his repertoire to include blues, and has recorded a blues album. He has also recorded some country music, having professed a love for that genre. Tommy Allsup, country producer and former member of Bob Wills' Texas Playboys, recruited Bell to sing "Warm Red Wine", which appeared on an album with songs from Glen Campbell, Tanya Tucker and Roy Clark. On May 5, 2021, Bell suffered a stroke on the right side of his body.

== Discography ==
=== Singles ===
Archie Bell & The Drells

- "She's My Woman, She's My Girl" / "Love Will Rain on You" – Ovide 222 [1967]
- "A Soldier's Prayer" / "One in One" – Ovide 226 [1967]
- "Tighten Up" / "Dog Eat Dog" – Ovide 228 [1967]
- "She's My Woman, She's My Girl" / "The Yankee Dance" – East West 55102 [1967]
- "She's My Woman, She's My Girl" / "The Yankee Dance" – East West 2048 [1968]
- "Tighten Up" / "Dog Eat Dog" – Atlantic 2478 [1968]
- "Tighten Up" / "pt II" – Atlantic 2478 [1968]
- "I Can't Stop Dancing" / "You're Such A Beautiful Child" – Atlantic 2534 [1968] (#17 Canada)
- "Love Will Rain on You" / "Do The Choo Choo" – Atlantic 2559 [1968] ("Do The Choo Choo" #44 Canada)
- "There's Gonna Be A Showdown" / "Go For What You Know" – Atlantic 2583 [1968] (#14 Canada)
- "Just A Little Closer" / "Love My Baby" – Atlantic 2612 [1969]
- "Girl You're Too Young" / "Do The Hand Jive" – Atlantic 2644 [1969] (#47 Canada)
- "Dancing To Your Music" / "Count The Ways" - Glades 1707 [1973]
- "I Could Dance All Night" / "King Of The Castle" - TSOP ZS8 4767 [1975]
- "Soul City Walk" / "King Of The Castle" - TSOP ZS8 4774 [1975]
- "Let's Groove" (Part 1) / "Let's Groove" (Part 2) - TSOP ZS8 4775 [1976]
- The Kays Band featuring Archie Bell – "Soul'd Out" – Major Records MR 906 (12")
- "Any Time Is Right" / "Without You" – Becket Records BKA 45-4 – 1981 (7")
- "Any Time Is Right" / "Why Didja Do Me" – Becket BKD-501 – 1981 (12")
- "Touchin' You" / "Touchin' You" (Instrumental) – WMOT Records WMOT-101 – 1982 (12")

=== Albums ===
- I Never Had It So Good – Becket 013 – 1981
