= I Can't Stop Dancing =

Studio album by Archie Bell & the Drells
- Released: 1968
- Genre: Funk, soul, R&B
- Label: Atlantic
- Producer: Kenneth Gamble, Leon Huff, L.J.F. Productions

Archie Bell & the Drells chronology
Tighten Up (1968)	I Can't Stop Dancing (1968)	There's Gonna Be a Showdown (1969)

I Can't Stop Dancing is a 1968 album by American funk band Archie Bell & the Drells, released by the record label Atlantic.

== Track listing ==
1. "I Can't Stop Dancing" (Kenny Gamble, Leon Huff)
2. "(Sitting On) The Dock of the Bay" (Otis Redding, Steve Cropper)
3. "Do the Choo Choo" (Kenny Gamble, Leon Huff)
4. "You're Such a Beautiful Child" (Archie Bell)
5. "Monkey Time" (Curtis Mayfield)
6. "Do You Feel It?" (Archie Bell, Lee Jay, Leroy Lewis)
7. "I've Been Trying" (Curtis Mayfield)
8. "Jammin' in Houston" (Archie Bell, Lee Jay)
9. "Love Will Rain on You" (Archie Bell)
10. "Sometimes I Wonder" (Curtis Mayfield)
