= Major Lance =

American R&B singer (c 1939–1994)

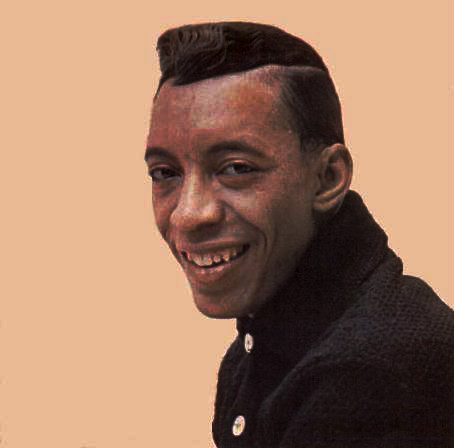
- Lance in 1965
- Born: April 4, 1939; Winterville, Mississippi, U.S.
- Died: September 3, 1994 (aged 55); Decatur, Georgia, U.S.
- Occupation: Singer
- Years active: 1959–1994
- Spouse: Christine Boular
- Children: 9, including Keisha Lance Bottoms
- Musical career
- Genres: Soul, pop, R&B
- Instrument: Vocals
- Labels: Mercury; Okeh; Dakar; Curtom; Volt; Playboy; Osiris; Columbia; Soul (Motown)

Major Lance (April 4, 1939 (Note: Other sources have claimed he was born in 1941 or 1942 however a one year old Mager Lance was on the 1940 census) – September 3, 1994) was an American R&B singer. After a number of US hits in the 1960s, including "The Monkey Time" and "Um, Um, Um, Um, Um, Um", he became an iconic figure in Britain in the 1970s among followers of Northern Soul. Although he stopped making records in 1982, Major Lance continued to perform at concerts and on tours until his death in 1994.

Lance's daughter, Keisha Lance Bottoms, is the governor-elect of Georgia, and will be the first Black woman governor in U.S. history, having won the 2026 election. She previously served as the 60th mayor of Atlanta.

== Early life ==
There has been some dispute over Major Lance's birth year; some sources claimed he was born in 1941 or in 1942 (as Lance claimed). However, 1939 appears to be the correct year of his birth. In the 1940 U.S. Census, "Mager" Lance is listed in Washington County, Mississippi, as the one-year-old son of Lucendy Lance, a widow. Lance's gravestone also confirms he was born in 1939. 'Major' was his given name, not a nickname or stage name.

Lance, who was one of 12 children, moved as a child with his family to the Near North Side of Chicago in the Cabrini-Green projects, a high-crime area, where he developed a boyhood friendship with Otis Leavill, with whom he attended Wells High School. This was the same school Curtis Mayfield and Jerry Butler attended. Mayfield called Lance a "sparkly fellow, and a great basketball player, which is probably how we met. His hero was Jackie Wilson, and he was always coming round and looking through my bag for songs that I'd written but didn't want to do with the Impressions. He was pretty good at picking them, too."

Lance was also a baseball player. Lance and Otis both did boxing, and also singing as members of the Five Gospel Harmonaires. The two of them also worked together at a drug store.

== Career ==
=== Beginnings ===
Lance and Otis Leavill formed a group named the Floats in the mid-1950s but broke up before recording any material. Lance became a featured dancer on a local television show, Time for Teens, and presenter Jim Lounsbury gave him a one-off record deal with Mercury Records. Mercury released his single "I Got a Girl", written and produced by Curtis Mayfield, in 1959; it was not successful. Lance worked at various jobs over the next few years.

=== Okeh Records ===
In 1962 he signed with Okeh Records on Mayfield's recommendation. Lance was constantly showing up at the Okeh offices, offering to run errands for Carl Davis, telling him about the record he'd once made and how he and Curtis Mayfield were friends from their childhood. His first single, "Delilah", was not successful, but it established his partnership with the writing and arranging team of Mayfield, Carl Davis, and Johnny Pate, often with members of Mayfield's group, the Impressions, on backing vocals. Together they developed a distinctive, Latin-tinged sound which epitomised Chicago soul in contrast to music recorded elsewhere.

"The Monkey Time" (1963)
The Monkey Time was Major Lance's first successful hit song, and it became Okeh's first hit single in 10 years.

The second Okeh single, "The Monkey Time" (also written by Curtis Mayfield), was Major Lance's first hit, became a No. 2 Billboard R&B chart and No. 8 pop hit in 1963. "The Monkey Time" became Okeh's first hit single in 10 years. "That was my introduction with working with Carl Davis," Pate said. "We had a ball, making some very great music."

A succession of hits followed quickly, including "Hey Little Girl", "Um, Um, Um, Um, Um, Um" (his biggest hit, reaching No. 5 in the US pop chart and No. 40 in the UK, where it was his only chart success), "The Matador" (the only one not written by Mayfield), "Rhythm", "Sometimes I Wonder", "Come See", and "Ain't It a Shame".

On 22 February 1964, Paul McCartney was photographed holding a copy of Major Lance's Um Um Um Um Um LP under his arm, as McCartney left a plane with other members of the Beatles, on their arrival back in the UK. Shortly afterwards John Lennon was quoted in Disc magazine as saying that his favourite records included Hey Little Girl by Major Lance, adding that "anything by Major Lance is O.K. by me. This one stands out because of the arrangement."

In 1965 Pate left Okeh, and Mayfield began to concentrate on working with his own group. Lance and Davis continued to work together; "Too Hot to Hold" was a minor hit, but they had diminishing success before Davis in turn left the company.

His songs were covered by other artists. The Yardbirds covered "Sweet Music," which Lance co-wrote with Otis Leavill Cobb and Walter Bowie. The song appeared on the Yardbird's US release, For Your Love.

=== Touring in the United Kingdom ===
During the 1960s, Lance toured the UK, where he was supported by Bluesology, a band including pianist Reggie Dwight, later known as Elton John.

Over the next two years he worked with several producers, with only "Without a Doubt" becoming a minor hit in 1968. Soon afterwards Lance left Okeh and moved to Dakar Records, where he had the Top 40 R&B hit "Follow the Leader." He then moved to Mayfield's Curtom label, which resulted in his last two Top 40 R&B hits, "Stay Away from Me (I Love You Too Much)" and "Must Be Love Coming Down." "Stay Away from Me" was also listed No. 4 in Jet Magazine's "Soul Brothers Top 20". He left Curtom in 1971 and recorded briefly for the Volt and Columbia labels.

In 1972, he relocated to England so as to capitalize on the success of his older records among fans of Northern Soul music in dance clubs that played mostly rare and obscure American soul and R&B records. According to one writer, "[T]he Major's contribution was truly phenomenal and unforgettable... [He] was to become legendary as a UK club act, known to deliver 110% at every performance." In 1972, while in England, he recorded an album, Major Lance's Greatest Hits Recorded Live at the Torch, at the Torch, a club in Stoke on Trent.

=== Later career ===
Lance returned to Atlanta in 1974 and recorded an updated disco version of "Um, Um, Um, Um, Um, Um" for Playboy Records. He set up a new label, Osiris, with former Booker T and the MG's drummer Al Jackson, but again with little success, and his career hit a downward spiral. He briefly recorded for Motown Records, releasing the last-ever single on its Soul Records subsidiary, "I Never Thought I'd Be Losing You," in 1978. He later found that his recordings had become popular on the beach music circuit in the Carolinas, where he continued to undertake live performances. He recorded a comeback album, The Major's Back, and several tracks for the Kat Family label. His final performance was in June 1994 at the 11th Chicago Blues Festival.

== Personal life ==
Major Lance was married to Christine (née Boular) Lance. He fathered nine children by different women. His daughter, Keisha Lance Bottoms, is an American politician and was mayor of Atlanta, Georgia from 2018 to 2022. She also worked in the Administration of President Joe Biden. She was elected Governor of Georgia as the Democratic party nominee in the 2026 Georgia gubernatorial election.

Lance died in 1994 in his sleep from heart disease in Decatur, Georgia. He is buried at Washington Memory Gardens Cemetery in Homewood, Illinois.

== Other ==
He was arrested twice in his lifetime. In 1965, he was arrested in violation of the Paternity Act. A Chicago woman, Para Lee Thomas, claimed she had a son by Lance, Ronnie Maurice Lance, born 1964. She asserted that Lance had promised to pay her doctor and hospital bills of around $375 but had defaulted on these payments. Judge Benjamin J. Kanter issued a warrant for Lance's arrest, setting Lance's bond at $1,000.

After recording briefly for the Motown subsidiary label Soul, he was convicted of cocaine possession in 1978 and served a four-year prison term.

In 1987, Lance had a heart attack. He later became nearly blind from glaucoma. As a result, he retired from the music industry.

== Other media ==
Cover art for the short CD collection titled The Very Best of Major Lance

On February 28, 1995, shortly after Lance's death, Sony released a CD collection called Everybody Loves a Good Time: Best of Major Lance. It features 40 recordings for Okeh from 1962 to 1967 on two discs. AllMusic reviewer Richie Unterberger gave the CD 4 1/2 stars, calling it a "Delightful 40-song, double-CD compilation of Lance's best work for Okeh between 1962 and 1967, including all of the chart singles, quite a few misses and B-sides, five previously unreleased cuts, and some Curtis Mayfield songs from his debut LP." Sony later released a shorter version of the CD collection titled The Very Best of Major Lance.

== Discography ==
=== Albums ===
- The Monkey Time (Okeh, 1963)
- Um, Um, Um, Um, Um, Um (Okeh, 1964)
- Major's Greatest Hits (Okeh, 1965)
- The Rhythm of Major Lance (Okeh, 1968)
- Major Lance's Greatest Hits Recorded Live at the Torch (Contempo, 1973)
- Now Arriving (Soul, 1978)
- The Major's Back (1983)
- Live at Hinkley (1986)
- The Very Best of Major Lance (Epic/Legacy EK 62243, 2000)
- Um, Um, Um, Um, Um, Um (Collectables 2003)

=== Singles ===
| Year | Titles (A-side, B-side) Both sides from same album except where indicated | Label & Cat. No. | Peak chart positions | | | | Album |
| Year | Titles (A-side, B-side) Both sides from same album except where indicated | Label & Cat. No. | US R&B | US | CAN | UK | Album |
|---|---|---|---|---|---|---|---|
| 1959 | "I've Got a Girl" b/w "Phyllis" | Mercury 71582 | — | — | — | — | Non-album tracks |
| 1962 | "Delilah" b/w "Everytime" (Non-album track) | Okeh 7168 | — | — | — | — | The Monkey Time |
| 1963 | "The Monkey Time" b/w "Mama Didn't Know" | Okeh 7175 | 2 | 8 | 32 | — | The Monkey Time |
| 1963 | "Hey Little Girl" b/w "Crying In The Rain" (Non-album track) | Okeh 7181 | 12 | 13 | 27 | — | Um, Um, Um, Um, Um, Um - The Best of Major Lance |
| 1964 | "Um, Um, Um, Um, Um, Um" b/w "Sweet Music" (from Major's Greatest Hits) | Okeh 7187 | 1 (Note: Billboard magazine did not publish an R&B chart during 1964; these chart positions are from Cashbox magazine.) | 5 | 6 | 40 | Um, Um, Um, Um, Um, Um - The Best of Major Lance |
| 1964 | "The Matador" b/w "Gonna Get Married" (Non-album track) | Okeh 7191 | 4 | 20 | — | — | Major's Greatest Hits |
| 1964 | "Girls" / | Okeh 7197 | 25 | 68 | — | — | Major's Greatest Hits |
| 1964 | "It Ain't No Use" | Okeh 7197 | 33 | 68 | — | — | Major's Greatest Hits |
| 1964 | "Think Nothing About It" b/w "It's Alright"; Release planned, but never pressed or issued. | Okeh 7200 | — | — | — | — | Um, Um, Um, Um, Um, Um - The Best of Major Lance |
| 1964 | "Rhythm" b/w "Please Don't Say No More" (Non-album track) | Okeh 7203 | 3 | 24 | — | — | Major's Greatest Hits |
| 1965 | "Sometimes I Wonder" b/w "I'm So Lost" (Non-album track) | Okeh 7209 | 13 | 64 | — | — | Major's Greatest Hits |
| 1965 | "Come See" b/w "You Belong to Me My Love" (Non-album track) | Okeh 7216 | 20 | 40 | — | — | Major's Greatest Hits |
| 1965 | "Ain't It a Shame" b/w "Gotta Get Away" | Okeh 7223 | 20 | 91 | — | — | Major's Greatest Hits |
| 1965 | "Too Hot to Hold" b/w "Dark and Lonely" | Okeh 7226 | 32 | 93 | — | — | Non-album tracks |
| 1965 | "Everybody Loves a Good Time" b/w "I Just Can't Help It" | Okeh 7233 | — | 109 | — | — | Non-album tracks |
| 1966 | "Investigate" b/w "Little Young Lover" | Okeh 7250 | — | 132 | — | — | Non-album tracks |
| 1966 | "It's the Beat" b/w "You'll Want Me Back" (from Um, Um, Um, Um, Um, Um - The Best Of Major Lance) | Okeh 7255 | 37 | 128 | — | — | Non-album tracks |
| 1967 | "Ain't No Soul (In These Old Shoes)" b/w "I" | Okeh 7266 | — | — | — | — | Non-album tracks |
| 1967 | "You Don't Want Me No More" b/w "Wait Till I Get You in My Arms" | Okeh 7284 | — | — | — | — | Non-album tracks |
| 1968 | "Without a Doubt" b/w "Forever" | Okeh 7298 | 49 | — | — | — | Non-album tracks |
| 1968 | "Do the Tighten Up" b/w "I Have No One" | Dakar 1450 | — | — | — | — | Non-album tracks |
| 1969 | "Follow the Leader" b/w "Since You've Been Gone" | Dakar 608 | 28 | 125 | — | — | Non-album tracks |
| 1969 | "Sweeter as the Days Go By" b/w "Shadows of a Memory" | Dakar 612 | — | — | — | — | Non-album tracks |
| 1970 | "Stay Away from Me (I Love You Too Much)" b/w "Gypsy Woman" | Curtom 1953 | 13 | 67 | — | — | Non-album tracks |
| 1970 | "Must Be Love Coming Down" b/w "Little Young Lover" | Curtom 1956 | 31 | 119 | — | — | Non-album tracks |
| 1971 | "Girl Come On Home" b/w "Since I Lost My Baby's Love" | Volt 4069 | — | — | — | — | Non-album tracks |
| 1971 | "I Wanna Make Up (Before We Break Up)" b/w "That's the Story of My Life" | Volt 4079 | — | — | — | — | Non-album tracks |
| 1972 | "Ain't No Sweat" b/w "Since I Lost My Baby's Love" | Volt 4085 | — | — | — | — | Non-album tracks |
| 1974 | "Um, Um, Um, Um, Um, Um" (New version) b/w "Last of the Red Hot Lovers" | Playboy 6017 | 59 | — | — | — | Non-album tracks |
| 1975 | "Sweeter as the Days Go By" (New version) b/w "Wild and Free" | Playboy 6020 | 58 | — | — | — | Non-album tracks |
| 1975 | "You're Everything I Need" b/w "You're Everything I Need" (Instrumental) | Osiris 001 | 50 | — | — | — | Non-album tracks |
| 1975 | "I've Got a Right to Cry" b/w "You Keep Me Coming to You" | Osiris 002 | — | — | — | — | Non-album tracks |
| 1977 | "Come On, Have Yourself a Good Time" b/w "Come What May" | Columbia 10488 | — | — | — | — | Non-album tracks |
| 1978 | "I Never Thought I'd Be Losing You" b/w "Chicago Disco" | Soul 35123 | — | — | — | — | Now Arriving |
| 1982 | "I Wanna Go Home" b/w "I Wanna Go Home" (Instrumental) | Kat Family 3024 | — | — | — | — | The Major's Back |
| 1982 | "Are You Leaving Me" b/w "I Wanna Go Home" | Kat Family 4182 | — | — | — | — | The Major's Back |
"—" denotes releases that did not chart or were not released in that territory.

== See also ==
- List of acts who appeared on American Bandstand
- List of disco artists (L-R)
- List of people who appeared on Soul Train
- List of soul musicians
