= The Rockerz =

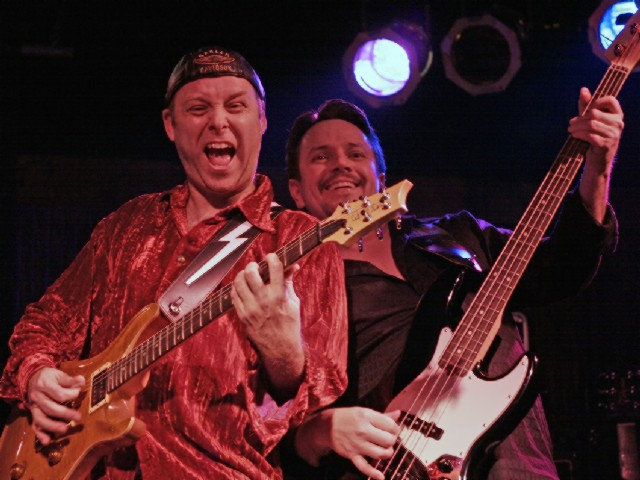
- Stevie G. & JT Strickler of The Rockerz (1 January 2000)

Background information
- Origin: Atlanta, Georgia, USA
- Genres: Rock, pop rock, R&B
- Years active: 1995-2010
- Label: Castle Records
- Members: Steve Guettler (vocals & guitar); Jeff Strickler (bass); Steve Farrell (guitar); Wes Armstrong (drums); Mike Wilson (keyboards)
- Past members: Bob Miceli (keyboards); Ray Thackston (drums); Brad Slipiec (keyboards); James Coker (drums); Frankie Aster (bass); Bill Whitley (drums); Will DeBouver (drums)
- Website: www.therockerz.com

The Rockerz were an American rock band originally from Atlanta, Georgia, United States, that experienced popularity in the Southeastern United States during the 1990s-2000s. The band released three albums on the Castle Records label, "If You came Here for The Party...," "Sand in My Shoes" and "Big News in a Small Town" with modest success and performed hundreds of shows throughout the Southeastern United States during their career, spanning more than two decades.

== Career ==
Formed in 1995, The Rockerz were a group of experienced studio and live musicians who performed with such artists as Marshall Tucker, Molly Hatchet, Classic Rock AllStars, Southern Rock AllStars, David Allan Coe, Dennis Yost & the Classics IV, The Tams, The Drifters, and Archie Bell & the Drells.

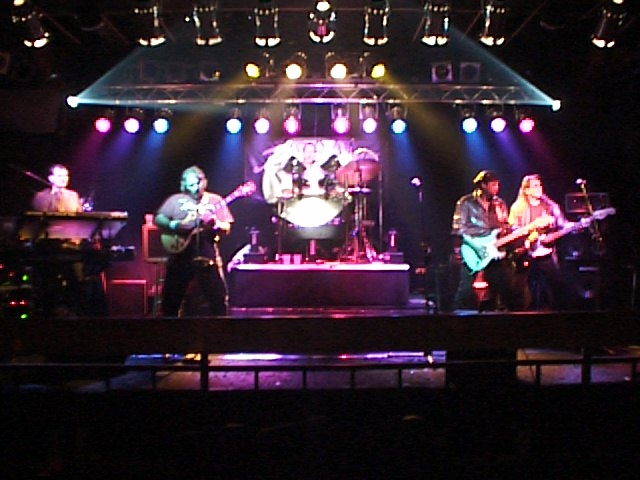
The Rockerz on stage in Atlanta (1997) L to R: Mike, Steve F, Wes, Stevie G, JT

The original lineup of The Rockerz included Steve Guettler on vocals and rhythm guitar, Jeff Strickler on bass guitar, Steve Farrell on lead guitar, Wes Armstrong on drums, and in 1997 the addition of Mike Wilson on keyboards.

Early rehearsals were held at Castle Studios in the Lawrenceville suburb of Atlanta, Georgia, beginning in 1995. The Rockerz first performed live together at the 1996 Summer Olympics in Atlanta, Georgia, then toured as back-up band to Dennis Yost & the Classics IV and Archie Bell & the Drells during the 1990s.

The band released two albums on the Castle Records label, "If You Came Here for The Party..." and "Sand in My Shoes" and toured extensively throughout the 1990s-2000s. In 2011, The Rockerz released their third album on the Castle Records label, "Big News in a Small Town" recorded at the Sound Kitchen in Nashville and mastered at Real2Real Studios in Atlanta.

== Members ==
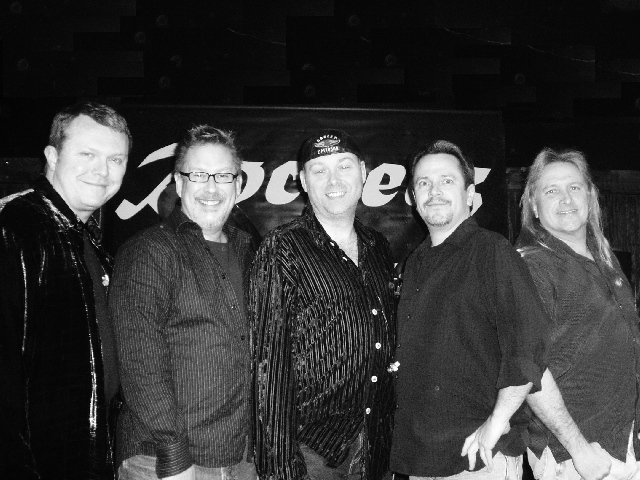
The Rockerz Lineup (2007) L to R: Chance, Brad, Stevie G, JT, Ray

=== Original lineup ===
- Steve "Stevie G." Guettler (vocals & guitar)
- Jeff "JT" Strickler (bass)
- Steve Farrell (guitar)
- Wes Armstrong (drums)
- Mike Wilson (keyboards)

=== Later members ===
- Bob "Machinegun" Micelli (keyboards)
- Ray "Animal" Thackston (drums)
- Brad Slipiec (keyboards)
- James Coker (drums)
- Frankie Aster (bass)
- Bill Whitley (drums)
- Will DeBouver (drums)

== Discography ==
=== Studio albums ===
- "If You Came Here for The Party..." (1996/Castle Records)
- "Sand in My Shoes" (2006/Castle Records)
- "Big News in a Small Town" (2011/Castle Records)

== Singles discography ==
=== Studio singles ===
- "If You Came Here for The Party..." (1996/Castle Records)
- "When I See You Smile" (2006/Castle Records)
- "Hit The Door" (2006/Castle Records)
- "Big News in a Small Town" (2011/Castle Records)
- "Danced in The Rain" (2011/Castle Records)
