= Tighten Up (Archie Bell & the Drells song) =

Single by Archie Bell & the Drells

from the album Tighten Up
- B-side: "Tighten Up" (Part 2)
- Released: c. March 1968
- Recorded: August 1967
- Genre: Funk; soul
- Length: 3:15 (Part 1)
- Label: Atlantic
- Songwriters: Archie Bell, Billy Buttler

Archie Bell & the Drells singles chronology
"(There's Gonna Be) A Showdown" (1968)	"Tighten Up" (1968)	"I Can't Stop Dancing" (1968)

Official audio
- "Tighten Up" (Remastered) on YouTube

"Tighten Up" is a song by R&B vocal group Archie Bell & the Drells. Released in 1968, it reached No. 1 on both the Billboard R&B and pop charts in the spring of 1968. It is ranked No. 265 on Rolling Stone magazine's list of the 500 Greatest Songs of All Time and is one of the earliest funk hits in music history.

== History ==
"Tighten Up" was written by Archie Bell and Billy Butler. It was one of the first songs that Archie Bell & the Drells recorded, in a session in August 1967 at the Jones Town Studio in Houston, Texas, along with a number of songs including "She's My Woman". The instrumental backing for "Tighten Up" was provided by the T.S.U. Toronadoes, the group which had developed it in their own live shows before they brought it to Archie Bell & the Drells at the suggestion of Skipper Lee Frazier, a Houston disc jockey who worked with both groups. At the recording session, the Drells worked late into the night with the Toronadoes as Archie Bell perfected the vocals.

Soon afterwards, Bell was drafted into the U.S. Army and began serving in Vietnam. Meanwhile, the song became a hit in Houston, and was picked up by Atlantic Records for distribution in April 1968. By the summer it topped both the Billboard R&B and pop charts. It also sold a million copies by May 1968, gaining an RIAA gold disc.

In the beginning of the song, Bell introduces himself and the Drells as being from Houston, Texas. According to the Billboard Book of Number One Hits by Fred Bronson, Bell had heard a comment after the Kennedy assassination in Dallas that "nothing good ever came out of Texas." Bell wanted his listeners to know "we were from Texas and we were good."

Although their leader was unavailable, the success of the single prompted the band to rush out their first album, which included the songs they had recorded in late 1967 and early 1968 with the Toronadoes.

In 1969, the group recorded their first full album with Gamble and Huff, I Can't Stop Dancing, which reached No. 28 on the R&B chart.

At the 1968 Olympics, American Olympian Wyomia Tyus was doing a dance waiting at the start line of the 100 meter race in which she became the first person in the event to retain the Olympic championship (she had won her first gold medal at Tokyo in 1964). When interviewed later by Olympic documentarian Bud Greenspan about what she was doing, she credited dancing to this song, a current hit at the time that was being sung and played on bongos by American fans near the start line.

In 1980, Japanese electronic music band Yellow Magic Orchestra released a synth-funk cover titled "Tighten Up (Japanese Gentlemen Stand Up Please)" which was included in the album X∞Multiplies. It was also released as a single and reached number 43 on the Oricon Singles Chart and sold 38,000 copies in Japan.

== Charts ==
Chart (1968)	Peak position
U.S. Billboard Hot 100	1
U.S. Billboard Hot Rhythm & Blues	1
Canada RPM 100	3

== See also ==
- List of Billboard Hot 100 number-one singles of 1968
- List of number-one R&B singles of 1968 (U.S.)
