= Henderson, Texas =

- City
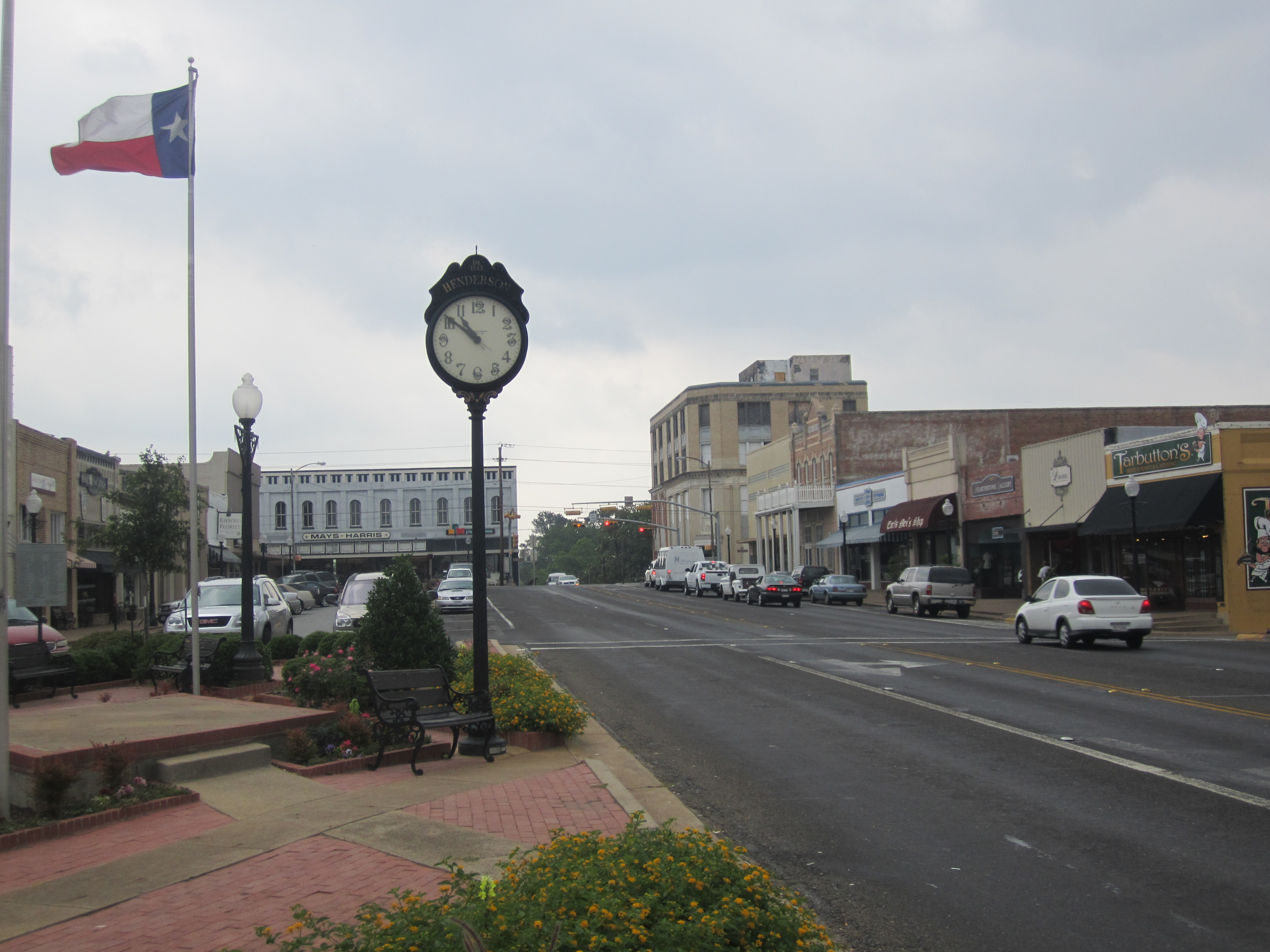
- Streetscape of historic downtown Henderson

- Location within Texas Location within the United States
- Coordinates: 32°9′14″N 94°48′10″W
- Country: United States
- State: Texas
- County: Rusk

Government
  - Type: Council-manager

Area
  - Total: 12.04 sq mi (31.19 km^{2})
  - Land: 11.95 sq mi (30.95 km^{2})
  - Water: 0.089 sq mi (0.23 km^{2})
- Elevation: 512 ft (156 m)

Population (2020)
  - Total: 13,271
  - Density: 1,100.7/sq mi (424.97/km^{2})
- Time zone: UTC-6 (Central (CST))
  - Summer (DST): UTC-5 (CDT)
- ZIP codes: 75652-75654
- Area code: 903/430
- FIPS code: 48-33212
- GNIS feature ID: 2410742
- Website: hendersontx.us

Henderson is a city and the county seat of Rusk County, Texas, United States. Its population was 13,271 at the 2020 census. Henderson is named for James Pinckney Henderson, the first governor of Texas.

The city has functioned as a major crossroads in Northeast Texas over the last two centuries. Several major highways pass through the business district of the town, including U.S. Route 259, Texas State Highway 64, U.S. Route 79, Texas State Highway 43, and Texas State Highway 42.

Annual events in the city of Henderson include the Heritage Syrup Festival in November, celebrating the East Texas tradition of sorghum syrup making, and the East Texas Sacred Harp Convention in August featuring shape note music.

== History ==
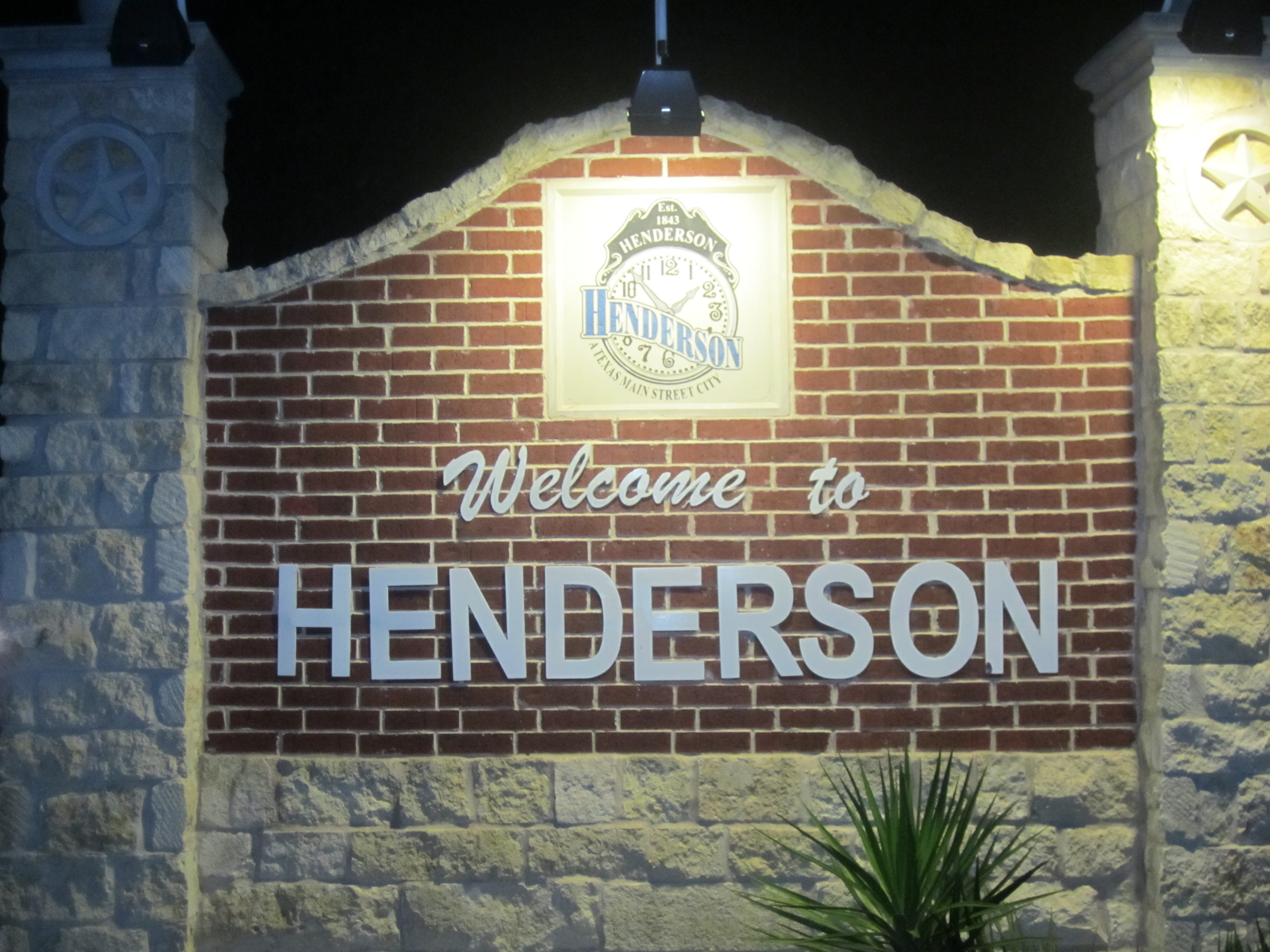
Henderson welcome sign on U.S. Highway 79

The city of Henderson was established by European Americans before the State of Texas was founded. It was developed on land donated by W.B. Ochiltree and James Smith; it became the county seat of Rusk County when an act of legislature created Rusk County on January 16, 1843. The First Methodist and First Baptist Churches were established in 1842 and 1845, respectively. Though a Baptist church was organized in 1845, the current First Baptist Church was reorganized in 1850. The first courthouse, made of wood, was completed in 1849. After the Civil War, the International and Great Northern Railroad crossed through Rusk County, but bypassed Henderson. In 1869, a White mob lynched five Black men without trial, including two preachers, in the public square outside the courthouse. In 1874, the Henderson and Overton Branch Railroad Company built a stretch of railroad connecting Henderson to the tracks running through Overton. This stretch of railroad was later sold to the Missouri Pacific Railroad (now Union Pacific) and remains in use to this day.

In 1878, a fire destroyed the courthouse, and a brick courthouse was built in its place. This encouraged the construction of several other brick buildings, including the Howard Dickinson House, now a historical site.

In 1930, C. M. "Dad" Joiner brought in the Daisy Bradford #3 Discovery Well 6 miles northwest of Henderson. The discovery of oil in October 1930 created a booming economy in the area, with the population of Henderson increasing from 2,000 to over 10,000 in a few months. The oil fields in and surrounding Henderson, part of the high-producing, five-county East Texas Oil Field, continue to provide a large part of the wealth of the town, county, and region.

During World War II, airmen cadets from the Royal Air Force, flying from their training base at Terrell, Texas, routinely flew to Henderson on training flights. The community served as a stand-in for the British for Dunkirk, France, which is the same distance from London, England, as Henderson is from Terrell.

=== 1860 Henderson fire ===
On August 5, 1860, a fire broke out and burned most of the booming town of Henderson. Forty-three buildings, including two hotels, were destroyed in the fire, for a loss of $220,000.

According to the Depot Museum, a man named John Crow recalled the fire as follows:

I was about eight years old when Henderson burned. I went to town with my father the day after the fire. It burned every house as well as I recollect, except the Flanagan Brick Building. I remember I was barefooted and careful not to burn my feet. My father said at the time they thought a fellow named Green Herndon, a union man, had hired a negro woman to burn Henderson. Herndon was a northerner and was a pronounced opponent of secession. On the negro woman's testimony, a mob gathered, threw a loop around his neck, tied it to a saddle horse, which went around the public square dragging Herndon to death. Then they hung the body to a tree and shot it full of holes ... War was in preparation and people were in fits of anger. When the war broke out, the men got all the files they could find and went to the blacksmith shops and made knives and swords. There was much laughter and I remember they said, "We'll whip those damn Yankees with axes and butcher knives. Everyone was anxious to go."

John Crow was John Stephen Crow, born in Henderson on March 5, 1852, and died there on October 19, 1952. He is buried at Maple Grove Cemetery. His father, Moses Melton Crow, was part of a large group of family, friends, and neighbors who left the area of Henry and Clayton Counties, Georgia, and were early settlers in Rusk County. The surnames of these early settlers include Burks, Cates, Crow, Mitchell, and others.

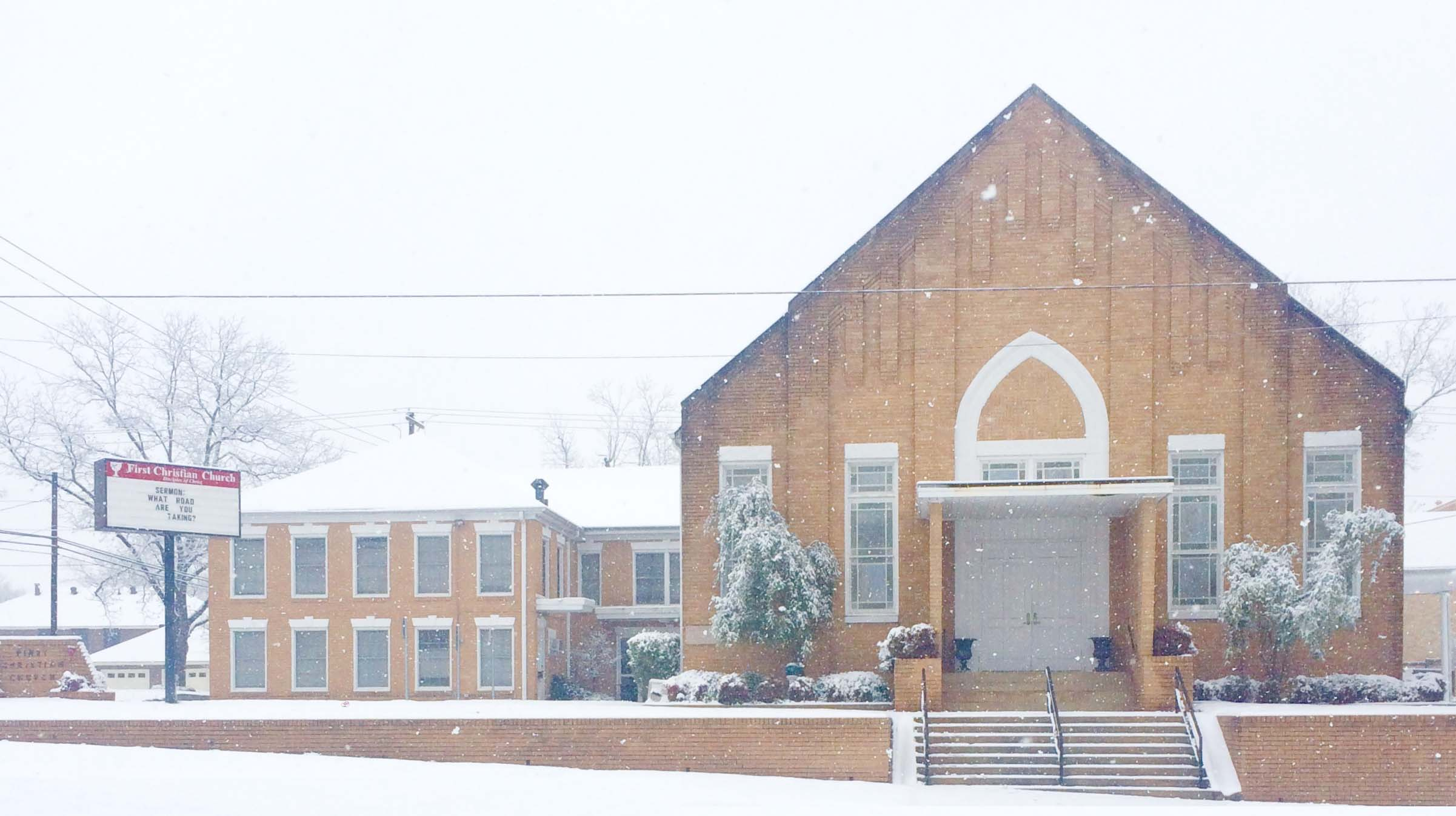
First Christian Church of Henderson, Texas

=== 2015 Henderson Tornado ===
On Memorial Day, May 25, 2015, an EF-2 rated tornado struck Henderson. That day, multiple tornadoes had struck other areas in Texas, Arkansas, and Oklahoma. The tornado uprooted trees, damaged buildings, and caused minor damage to areas such as downtown, but no severe damage was recorded.

== Geography ==
Henderson is positioned along the ridge that separates the Sabine River watershed from the Neches River watershed.

According to the United States Census Bureau, the city has a total area of 12.0 square miles (31 km^{2}), of which 0.1 sq mi (0.26 km^{2}) of it (0.92%) is covered by water.

== Transportation ==
=== Airports ===
The Rusk County Airport is a county-owned, public-use airport located 3 miles west of downtown Henderson.

=== Major highways ===
- State Highway 64
- State Highway 42
- State Highway 43
- Highway 259
- Highway 79

== Demographics ==
Historical population
| Census | Pop. | Note | %± |
|---|---|---|---|
| 1870 | 918 | | — |
| 1880 | 1,656 | | 80.4% |
| 1890 | 1,536 | | −7.2% |
| 1920 | 2,273 | | — |
| 1930 | 2,932 | | 29.0% |
| 1940 | 6,437 | | 119.5% |
| 1950 | 6,833 | | 6.2% |
| 1960 | 9,666 | | 41.5% |
| 1970 | 10,187 | | 5.4% |
| 1980 | 11,473 | | 12.6% |
| 1990 | 11,139 | | −2.9% |
| 2000 | 11,273 | | 1.2% |
| 2010 | 13,712 | | 21.6% |
| 2020 | 13,271 | | −3.2% |
U.S. Decennial Census

=== 2020 census ===
As of the 2020 census, 13,271 people, 4,204 households, and 2,752 families were residing in the city. The median age was 37.3 years; 21.5% of residents were under the age of 18 and 16.4% of residents were 65 years of age or older. For every 100 females there were 111.3 males, and for every 100 females age 18 and over there were 115.8 males age 18 and over.

94.6% of residents lived in urban areas, while 5.4% lived in rural areas.

There were 4,204 households in Henderson, of which 36.1% had children under the age of 18 living in them. Of all households, 45.6% were married-couple households, 15.8% were households with a male householder and no spouse or partner present, and 33.5% were households with a female householder and no spouse or partner present. About 26.9% of all households were made up of individuals and 12.9% had someone living alone who was 65 years of age or older.

There were 4,749 housing units, of which 11.5% were vacant. The homeowner vacancy rate was 2.7% and the rental vacancy rate was 15.0%.

Racial composition as of the 2020 census
| Race | Number | Percent |
|---|---|---|
| White | 7,047 | 53.1% |
| Black or African American | 3,081 | 23.2% |
| American Indian and Alaska Native | 71 | 0.5% |
| Asian | 99 | 0.7% |
| Native Hawaiian and Other Pacific Islander | 6 | 0.0% |
| Some other race | 1,852 | 14.0% |
| Two or more races | 1,115 | 8.4% |
| Hispanic or Latino (of any race) | 3,154 | 23.8% |

=== 2000 census ===
As of the 2000 census, 11,273 people, 4,350 households, and 2,971 families were residing in the city. The population density was 947.6 people/sq mi (365.8/km^{2}). The 4,831 housing units averaged 406.1/sq mi (156.7/km^{2}). The racial makeup of the city was 68.98% White, 22.34% African American, 0.27% Native American, 0.47% Asian, 6.81% from other races, and 1.13% from two or more races. Hispanics or Latinos of any race were 11.80% of the population.

Of the 4,350 households, 32.6% had children under 18 living with them, 51.3% were married couples living together, 13.7% had a female householder with no husband present, and 31.7% were not families. About 28.9% of all households were made up of individuals, and 17.1% had someone living alone who was 65 or older. The average household size was 2.52, and the average family size was 3.12.

In the city, the age distribution was 26.9% under 18, 8.9% from 18 to 24, 25.9% from 25 to 44, 19.5% from 45 to 64, and 18.8% who were 65 or older. The median age was 37 years. For every 100 females, there were 87.3 males. For every 100 females 18 and over, there were 81.2 males.

The median income for a household in the city was $31,766, and for a family was $38,095. Males had a median income of $31,285 versus $19,473 for females. The per capita income for the city was $19,491.

== Government ==
=== Local government ===
The structure of the management and coordination of city services is:

| Department | Director |
|---|---|
| Mayor | Henry Pace |
| City Council | Stephen Strong, Michael Searcy, Greg Jackson, Melissa Morton, and Gina Juarez. |
| City Manager | Jay Abercrombie |
| Municipal Court Judge | Honorable James Holmes |
| City Attorney | Russell C. Brown, Esq. |
| City Secretary | Cheryl Jimerson |
| Director of Operations | Davis Brown |
| Police Chief | Chad Taylor |
| Fire Chief | Sonny Ybarra |
| Public Utilities Director | Randy Boyd |
| Public Service Director | Kirk Kimbrell |
| Finance Director | Karen Arnall |
| Tourism & Main Street Coordinator | Alexa Duke |
| Civic Center Manager | Stephanie Kimbrell |

=== State government ===
Henderson is represented in the Texas Senate by Republican Bryan Hughes, District 1, and in the Texas House of Representatives by Republican Joanne Shofner, District 11.

The Texas Department of Criminal Justice contracts for the operation of East Texas Multi-Use Facility in Henderson, housing over 2000 male and female state inmates in treatment programs. The facility is operated by the Management and Training Corporation.

=== Federal government ===
At the federal level, the two U.S. Senators from Texas are Republicans John Cornyn and Ted Cruz; Henderson is part of Texas' US Congressional 1st District, which is currently represented by Republican Nathaniel Moran.

== Education ==
=== Primary and secondary schools ===
==== Public schools ====
The Henderson Independent School District includes five campuses: Wylie Primary School, Wylie Elementary School, Northside Intermediate School, Henderson Middle School, and Henderson High School. The school mascot of Henderson is a lion, and the school colors are red and blue. School sports are an important part of Henderson's culture. A 3-A school, the Henderson Lions football team beat Chapel Hill, Texas, to become state champions in 2010. Many students are members of one or more athletic organizations.

A very small portion of the City of Henderson falls within the West Rusk ISD.

==== Private schools ====
The City of Henderson is also served by Full Armor Christian Academy, a nondenominational private school.

=== Colleges ===
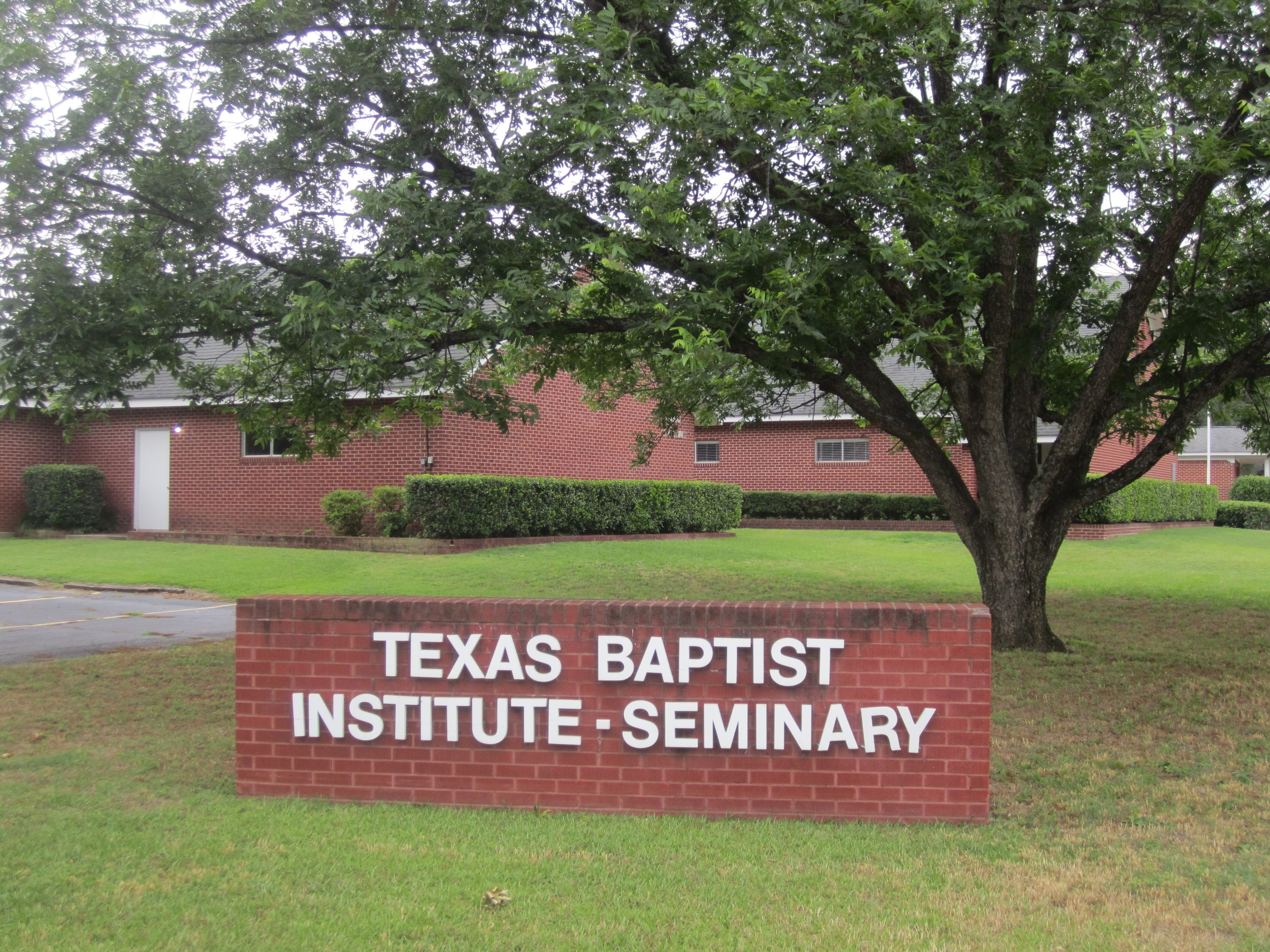
Texas Baptist Institute and Seminary at 1300 Longview Avenue in Henderson

Henderson is the home of the Texas Baptist Institute and Seminary, a Missionary Baptist institution of the American Baptist Association.

== Media ==
Currently, seven media outlets and two newspapers are located in Henderson, including the Kilgore News Herald (headquartered in the city), as well as many more in the surrounding areas.

=== Newspaper ===
- Kilgore News Herald – Official website
- The Henderson News

=== Radio ===
==== AM stations ====
| Frequency | Call letters | Format | Name |
Stations Broadcast from Henderson
| 1470 | KWRD | News/Talk |

==== FM stations ====
| Frequency | Call letters | Format | Name |
Stations broadcast from Henderson
| 100.7 | KTYK | Public Radio | Red River Radio |

== Culture ==
=== Parks and recreation ===
Henderson has six parks, covering 118 acres. The parks are: Fair Park, Lake Forest Park, Misner Park, Montgomery Park, Smith Park, and Yates Park.

Lake Forest Park covers 60 acres and is the largest park in Henderson. It features a 15-acre lake, three fishing piers, a disc golf course, gardens, lighted pavilions, playgrounds, the Henderson Civic Center, and a plaza for concerts and events.

Fair Park covers 40 acres and features 1.8 miles of walking trails, a skate park, a baseball field, tennis courts, playgrounds, a splash pad, and a pavilion.

=== Libraries and museums ===
The Depot Museum sits on 5 acres, and features a museum, a children's discovery center, and several historic buildings and structures, including a railroad depot, a dry goods store, a caboose, and a cotton gin.

The Rusk County Library is located in a historic building at 106 East Main Street in downtown Henderson.

=== Attractions ===
The Henderson Civic Theater is a community theater that puts on live stage performances. It is located in historic downtown Henderson in the old Opera House building.

The Veteran's Memorial is located at the Rusk County Courthouse and honors veterans from Rusk County.

The Howard-Dickinson House is a Texas Historic Landmark that was built in 1855 and offers tours.

== Notable people ==
- Archie Bell, lead singer for Archie Bell & the Drells
- Reagan V. Brown, commissioner of the Texas Department of Agriculture from 1977 to 1983
- Drew Coleman, cornerback for New York Jets, Jacksonville Jaguars, Detroit Lions
- Vernell Coleman, community organizer
- Joe Delaney, late running back for the Kansas City Chiefs
- Rickey Dudley, tight end for the Oakland Raiders, Cleveland Browns, and Tampa Bay Buccaneers
- Sandy Duncan, singer, actress, comedian
- Trestan Ebner, running back for the Chicago Bears
- Thomas S. Gathright, the first president of the State Agricultural and Mechanical College of Texas
- Ricky Lynn Gregg, singer
- Bror Julius Olsson Nordfeldt, Swedish painter, died in Henderson
- Paul Sadler, Henderson attorney, former state representative
- General James Smith, general in Texas Revolution, served in first Texas legislature
- Mark White, former governor of Texas
- Harry Whittington, lawyer

== Climate ==
The climate in this area is characterized by hot, humid summers and generally mild to cool winters. According to the Köppen climate classification, Henderson has a humid subtropical climate, Cfa on climate maps.

Climate data for Henderson, Texas (1991–2020 normals, extremes 1941–present)
| Month | Jan | Feb | Mar | Apr | May | Jun | Jul | Aug | Sep | Oct | Nov | Dec | Year |
|---|---|---|---|---|---|---|---|---|---|---|---|---|---|
| Record high °F (°C) | 86 (30) | 92 (33) | 92 (33) | 93 (34) | 101 (38) | 104 (40) | 108 (42) | 110 (43) | 111 (44) | 96 (36) | 87 (31) | 84 (29) | 111 (44) |
| Mean daily maximum °F (°C) | 58.5 (14.7) | 62.7 (17.1) | 69.8 (21.0) | 77.0 (25.0) | 83.6 (28.7) | 90.3 (32.4) | 93.6 (34.2) | 95.0 (35.0) | 89.4 (31.9) | 79.6 (26.4) | 68.1 (20.1) | 60.6 (15.9) | 77.4 (25.2) |
| Daily mean °F (°C) | 47.0 (8.3) | 50.7 (10.4) | 57.6 (14.2) | 64.7 (18.2) | 72.6 (22.6) | 79.6 (26.4) | 82.8 (28.2) | 83.2 (28.4) | 77.2 (25.1) | 66.8 (19.3) | 56.1 (13.4) | 49.1 (9.5) | 65.6 (18.7) |
| Mean daily minimum °F (°C) | 35.6 (2.0) | 38.7 (3.7) | 45.3 (7.4) | 52.5 (11.4) | 61.7 (16.5) | 69.0 (20.6) | 72.1 (22.3) | 71.4 (21.9) | 65.1 (18.4) | 54.0 (12.2) | 44.1 (6.7) | 37.6 (3.1) | 53.9 (12.2) |
| Record low °F (°C) | 4 (−16) | −3 (−19) | 13 (−11) | 25 (−4) | 38 (3) | 51 (11) | 52 (11) | 53 (12) | 37 (3) | 24 (−4) | 17 (−8) | −1 (−18) | −3 (−19) |
| Average precipitation inches (mm) | 4.11 (104) | 4.10 (104) | 4.63 (118) | 4.40 (112) | 4.67 (119) | 4.76 (121) | 3.39 (86) | 3.62 (92) | 3.82 (97) | 4.22 (107) | 4.06 (103) | 4.63 (118) | 50.41 (1,280) |
| Average snowfall inches (cm) | 0.2 (0.51) | 0.3 (0.76) | 0.1 (0.25) | 0.0 (0.0) | 0.0 (0.0) | 0.0 (0.0) | 0.0 (0.0) | 0.0 (0.0) | 0.0 (0.0) | 0.0 (0.0) | 0.0 (0.0) | 0.0 (0.0) | 0.6 (1.5) |
| Average precipitation days (≥ 0.01 in) | 9.2 | 9.7 | 9.1 | 8.0 | 8.3 | 9.0 | 7.1 | 6.6 | 6.6 | 7.4 | 8.0 | 9.5 | 98.5 |
| Average snowy days (≥ 0.1 in) | 0.2 | 0.2 | 0.1 | 0.0 | 0.0 | 0.0 | 0.0 | 0.0 | 0.0 | 0.0 | 0.0 | 0.0 | 0.5 |
Source: NOAA

== Gallery ==
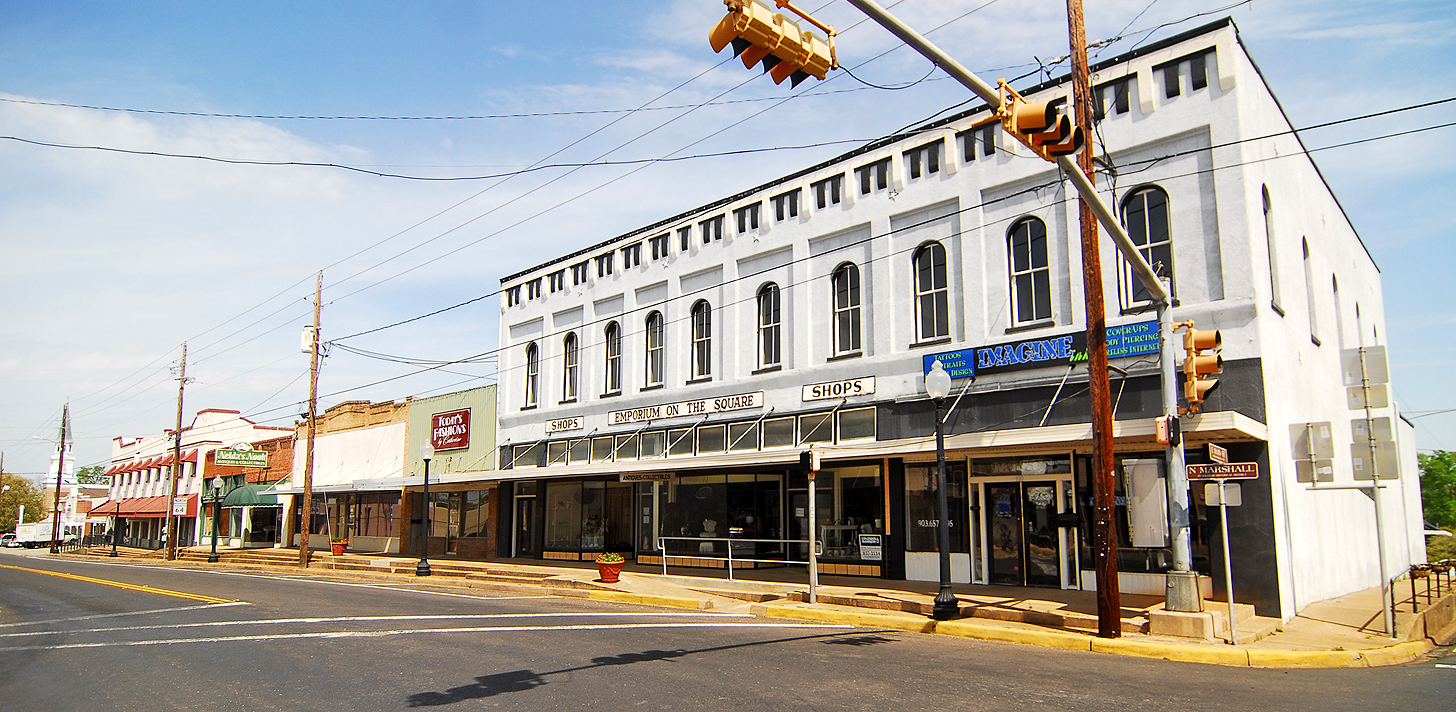
Downtown Henderson

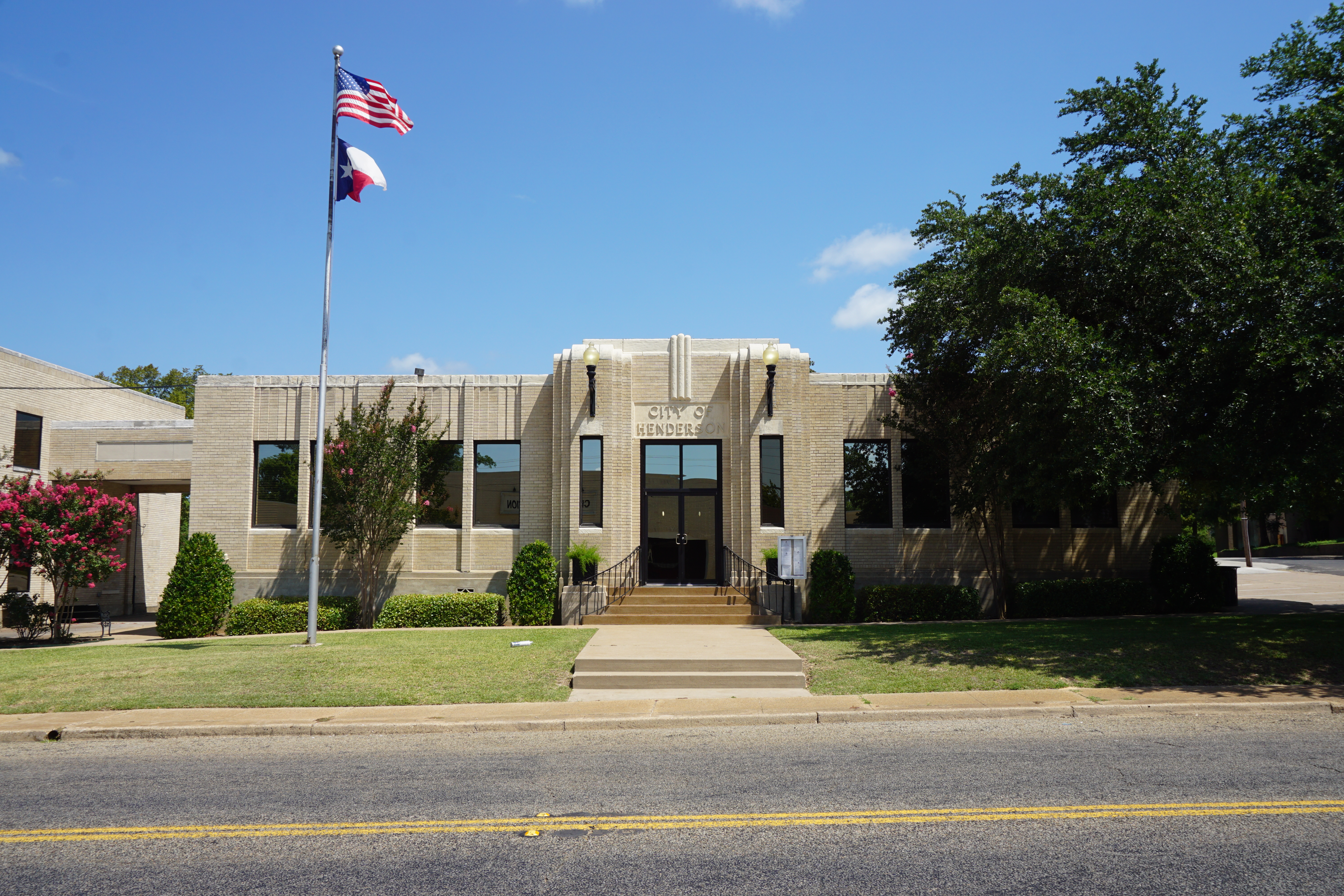
Henderson City Hall

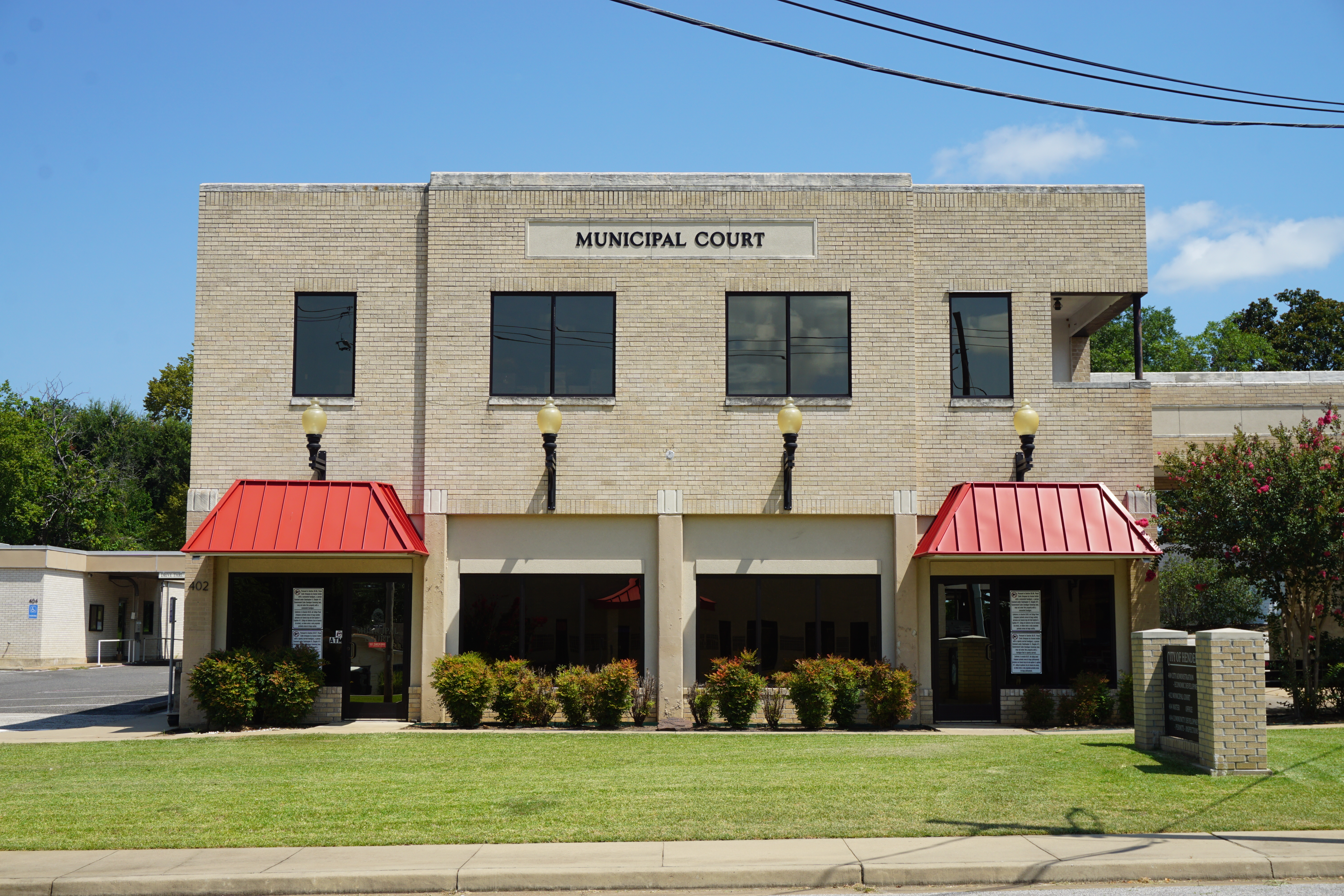
Henderson Municipal Court

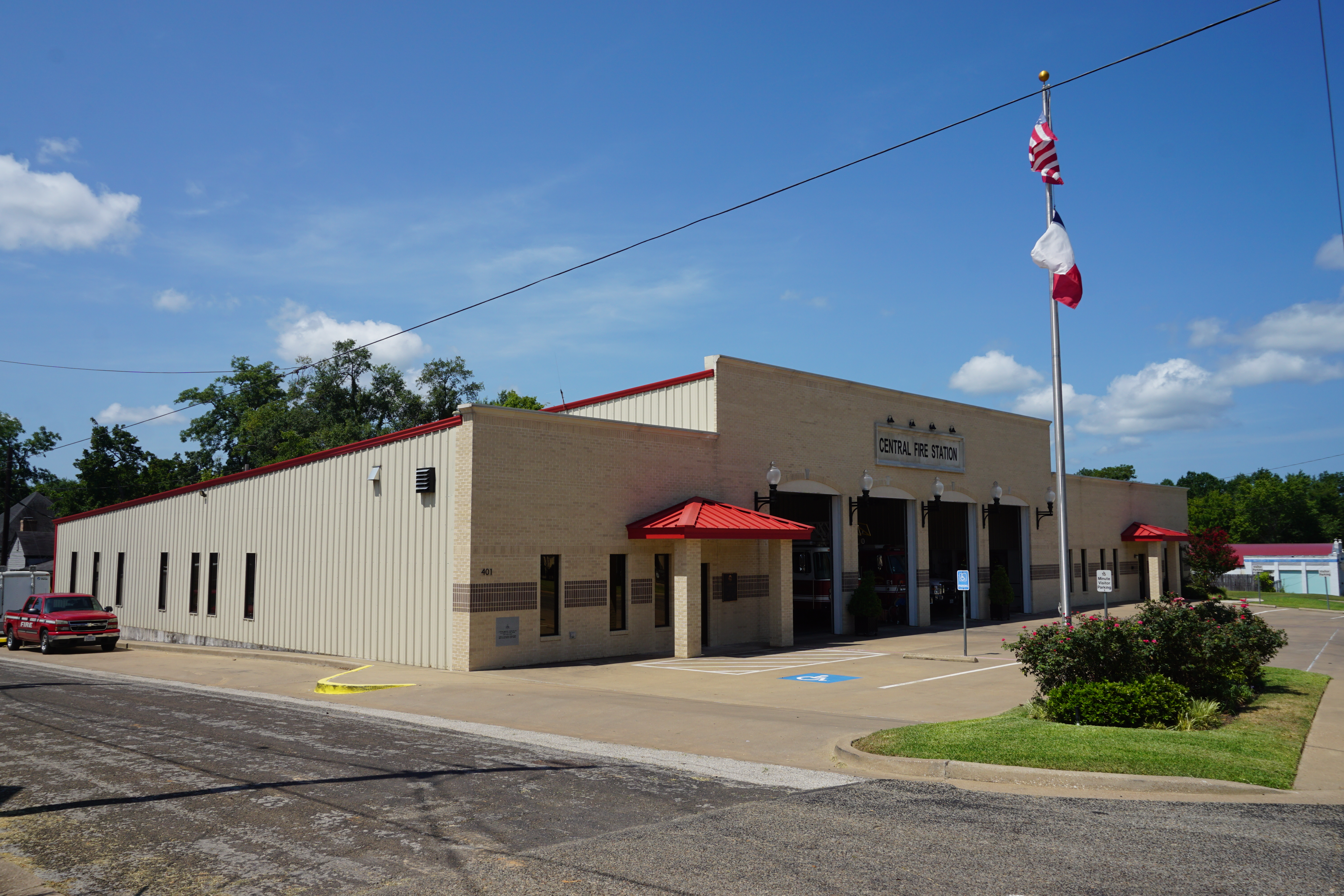
Central Fire Station in Henderson

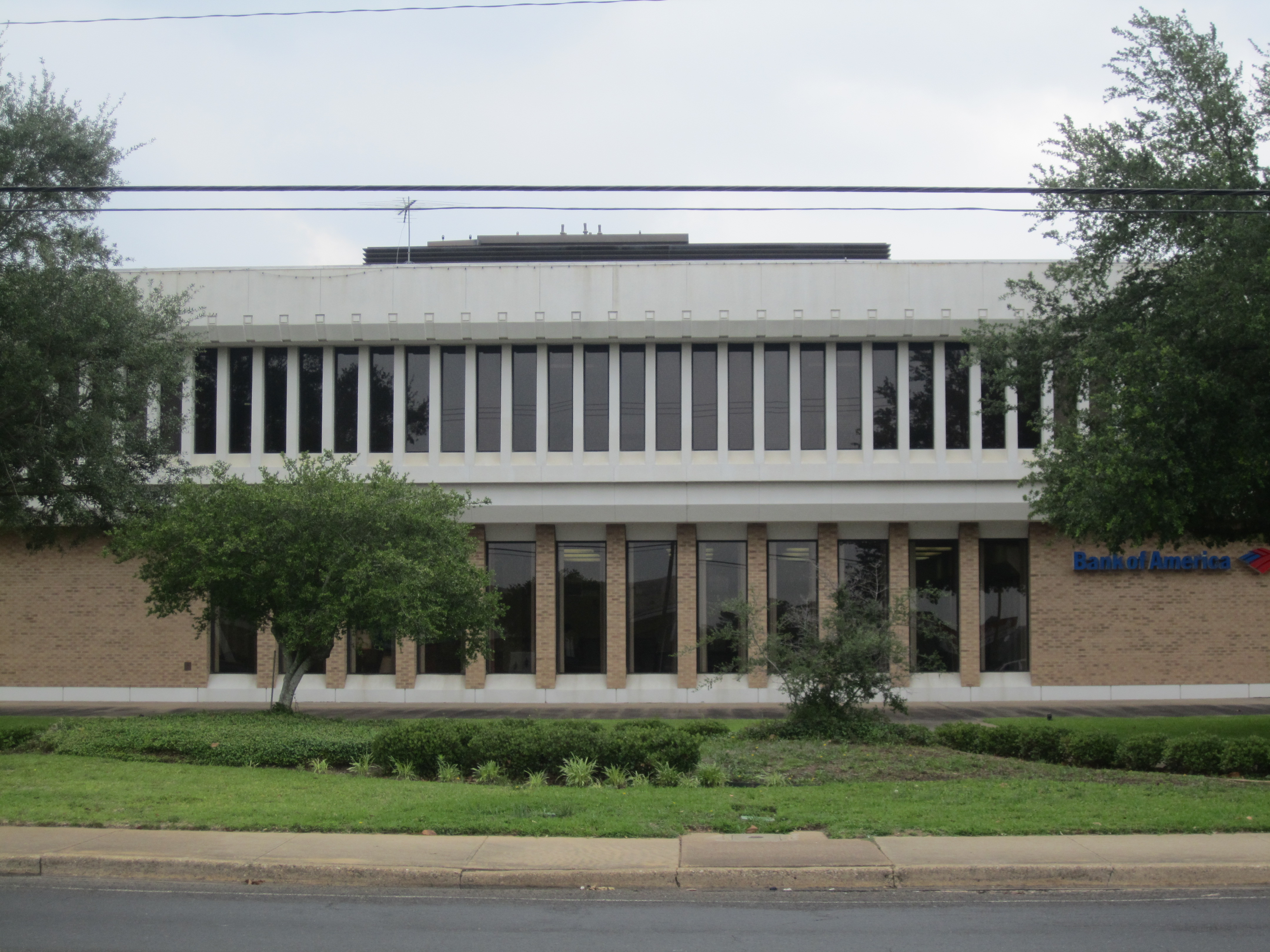
Former Bank of America building in Henderson

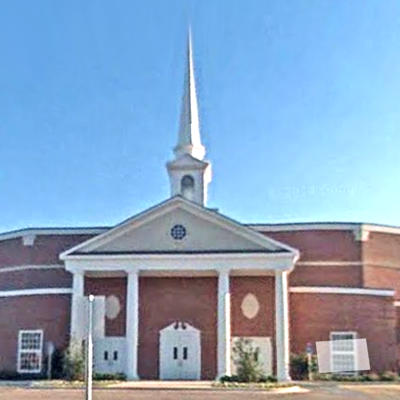
Calvary Baptist Church, Henderson

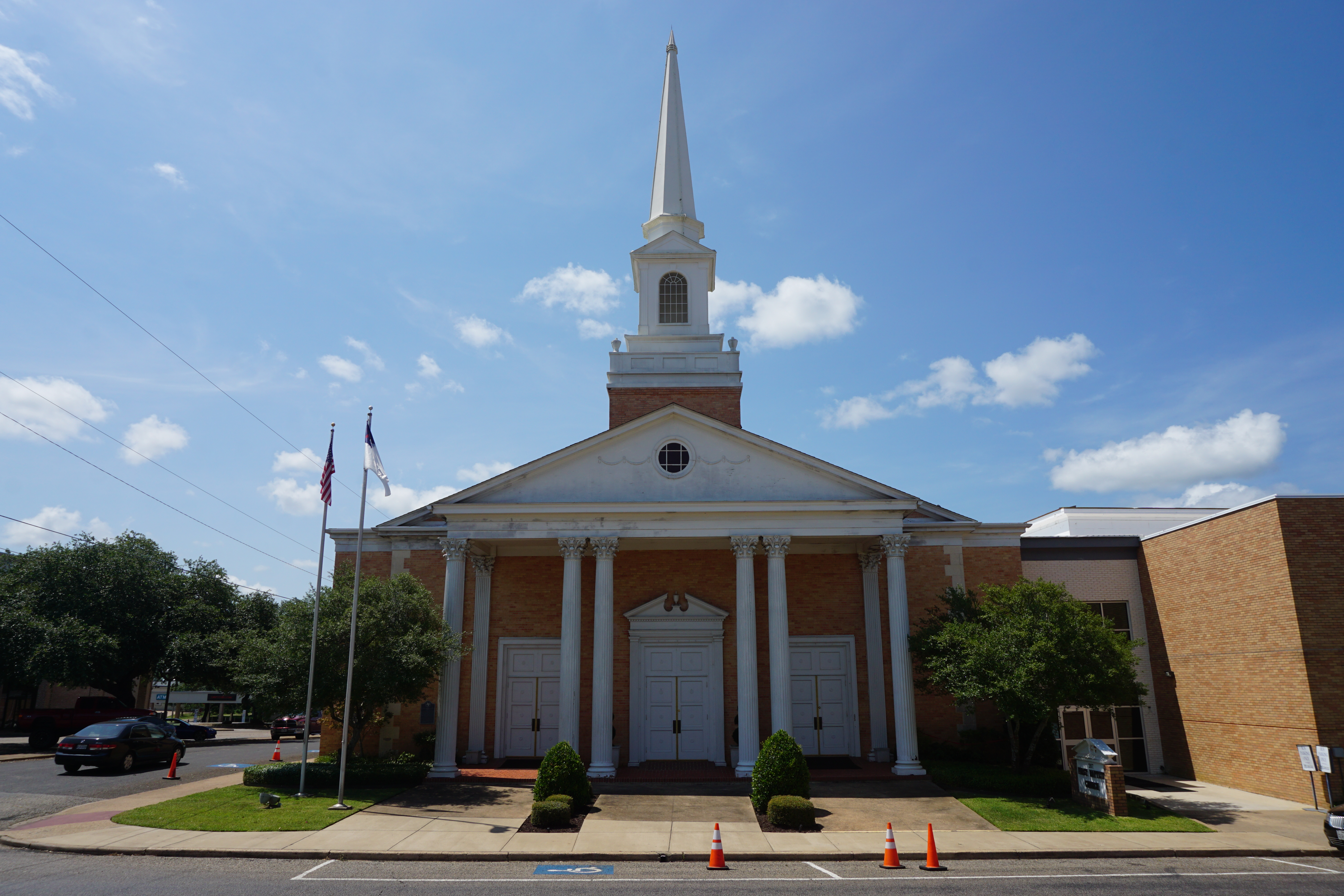
First Baptist Church of Henderson

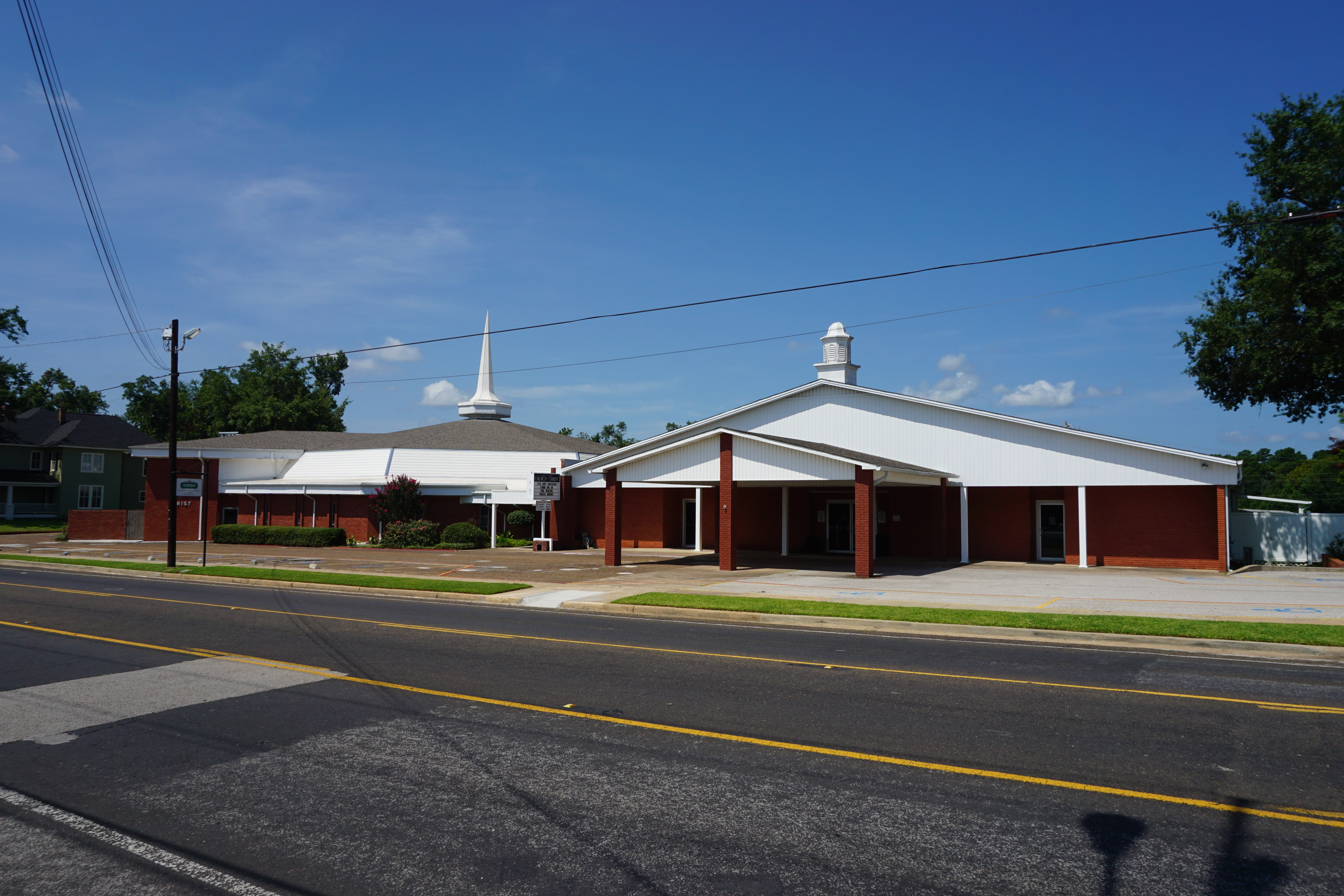
South Main Street Church of Christ in Henderson

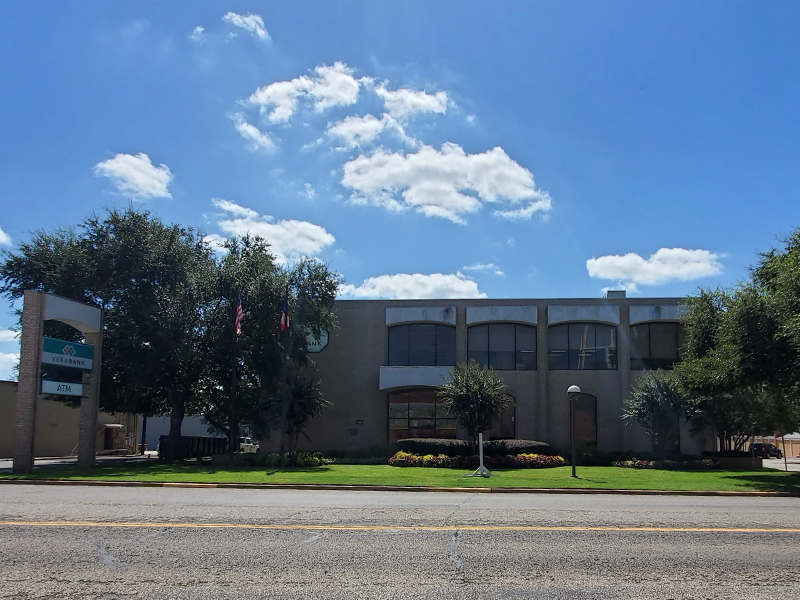
VeraBank headquarters and branch at 201 W. Main Street in downtown Henderson
