= Tighten Up (Archie Bell & the Drells album) =

Studio album by Archie Bell & the Drells
- Released: 1968
- Recorded: 1967
- Studio: Jones Sound, Houston, Texas
- Genre: Funk, soul, R&B
- Length: 27:46
- Label: Atlantic
- Producer: LJF Productions

Archie Bell & the Drells chronology
Tighten Up (1968)	I Can't Stop Dancing (1969)

Singles from Tighten Up
- 1. "Tighten Up" Released: February 1968

Tighten Up is an album by American funk band Archie Bell & the Drells, released by Atlantic Records in 1968.

== Credits ==
Instrumental backing was provided by the T.S.U Tornadoes. Members included Cal Thomas and Will Thomas on guitar, Jerry Jenkins on bass, Robert Sanders on organ, Dwight Burns on drums, Darryl Bursby on sax, Clarence Harper on trumpet, and Leroy Lewis and Nelson Mills on horns. The design of the album cover was by Loring Eutemey.

== Chart performance ==
The album peaked at No. 142 on the Billboard Top LPs. during an eight-week run on the chart.

== Track listing ==
1. "Tighten Up (Part One)" (Archie Bell, Billy Buttler) - 3:10
2. "Tighten Up (Part Two)" (Bell, Buttier) - 2:48
3. "I Don't Wanna Be a Playboy" (Earl Hines, James Bonner) - 3:01
4. "You're Mine" (Cal Thomas) - 3:45
5. "Knock on Wood" (Eddie Floyd, Steve Cropper) - 2:33
6. "Give Me Time" (Sunny Ozuna) - 2:32
7. "In the Midnight Hour" (Steve Cropper, Wilson Pickett) - 2:28
8. "When You Left Heartache Began" (Bell) - 2:36
9. "A Thousand Wonders" (Thomas) - 2:08
10. "A Soldier's Prayer, 1967" (Bell) - 2:45

== Charts ==
Chart (1968)	Peak position
US Billboard Top LPs	142
