= Archie Bell & the Drells =

American R&B vocal group

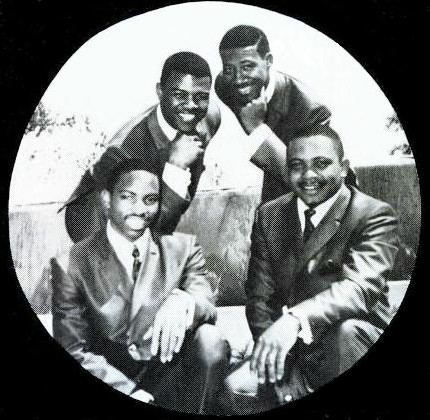
- The group in 1968

Background information
- Origin: Houston, Texas, U.S.
- Genres: Funk, R&B, soul, Southern soul
- Years active: 1966–1980
- Labels: Atlantic; Philadelphia International; Becket
- Members: Archie Bell; Lee Bell; Joe Cross; Willie Parnell; James Wise; Lucious Larkins; Billy Butler

Archie Bell & the Drells was an American R&B vocal group from Houston and one of the main acts produced by Kenneth Gamble and Leon Huff in the late 1960s before the duo formed their highly successful label Philadelphia International Records in 1971. The group's hits include "Tighten Up", "I Can't Stop Dancing" (both 1968), "There's Gonna Be a Showdown", "Girl You're Too Young" (1969), "Here I Go Again" (also a UK hit in 1972), "The Soul City Walk" (1975), "Let's Groove", "Everybody Have a Good Time" (1977), and "Don't Let Love Get You Down" (1976).

== History ==
=== Early days ===
Archie Bell (born September 1, 1944), who founded the group, was born in Henderson, Texas; his family moved to Houston before he was a year old. Archie formed the group in 1966 with his friends James Wise, Willie Parnell and Billy Butler.

They signed with the Houston-based record label Ovide in 1967 and recorded a number of songs including "She's My Woman" and "Tighten Up", which was recorded in October 1967 at the first of several sessions in which the Drells were backed by the instrumental group the T.S.U. Toronadoes. The origins of "Tighten Up" came from a conversation Archie Bell had with Butler. Bell was despondent after receiving his draft notice, and Butler, in an attempt to cheer him up, demonstrated the "Tighten Up" dance to Bell.

Bell's promoter, Skipper Lee Frazier, unsuccessfully began pushing the flip side of "Tighten Up", a song called "Dog Eat Dog". But at the recommendation of a friend he gave the other side a try. "Tighten Up", written by Archie Bell and Billy Butler. Bell prodded listeners to dance to the funky musical jam developed by the T.S.U. Toronadoes; It became a hit in Houston before it was picked up by Atlantic Records for distribution in April 1968. By the summer it topped both the Billboard R&B and pop charts. It also received a R.I.A.A. gold disc by selling one million copies. According to the Billboard Book of Number One Hits by Fred Bronson, Bell heard a comment after the Kennedy assassination in Dallas that "nothing good ever came out of Texas." Bell wanted his listeners to know "we were from Texas and we were good."

Many believe Bell was wounded in action in Vietnam while the band was still at the height of its fame, but he actually injured his leg in a truck accident while stationed in Germany. The success of the single prompted the band to rush out an album, despite their incapacitated leader. In 1969 the group recorded their first full album with Gamble and Huff, I Can't Stop Dancing, which reached number 28 on the R&B album chart. By that time another of Archie's brothers, Lee Bell (born January 14, 1946 in Houston), had replaced Butler and became the band's choreographer.

Reid Farrell, who was from Houston was a guitarist who traveled and played with the group.

=== Later career ===
The band backing Archie Bell & the Drells from 1975 to 1979 was called "The Melting Pot Band", which featured musicians from several states. McNasty McKnight was the band leader playing trombone. Graduates of the High School for the Performing and Visual Arts (HSPVA) in Houston traveled with the group, including Don Pope and Tony Salvaggio on saxophone. Other musicians included Lonnie LaLanne and Calvin Owens (trumpet); Abel Salazar (keyboards), and Mike Hughes (drums). LaLanne and Owens were alumni of B.B. King's band.

In 1975, the band released their "total-disco comeback album," Dance Your Troubles Away. The single "The Soul City Walk" made number 13 in the UK Singles Chart, but reached only number 42 on the US R&B chart. However, the album’s next single, “Let’s Groove”, reached number 7 on the R&B chart and became their biggest hit since 1969.

After moderate chart showings in the late 1970s, the group split in 1980. Archie Bell later released one solo album titled I Never Had It So Good in 1981 on Becket Records; he continued to perform with the Drells for the next twenty years. During the 1990s the lineup also included Steve "Stevie G." Guettler (guitar, vocals), Jeff "JT" Strickler (bass guitar, vocals), Steve Farrell (guitar, vocals), Mike Wilson (keyboards, vocals) and Wes Armstrong (drums, vocals) of the Atlanta-based group The Rockerz. On April 16, 2013, the mayor of Houston Annise Parker honored Archie Bell, Lucious Larkins, and James Wise with a proclamation of Archie Bell and the Drells Day.

== Discography ==
=== Albums ===
Year	Album details	Peak chart positions	
Year	Album details	US 200	US R&B
1968	Tighten Up: Label: Atlantic Records	142	1
1969	I Can't Stop Dancing: Label: Atlantic Records	—	28
1969	There's Gonna Be a Showdown: Label: Atlantic Records	163	—
1975	Dance Your Troubles Away: Label: TSOP/Philadelphia International	95	11
1977	Where Will You Go When the Party's Over: Label: Philadelphia International	—	47
1977	Hard Not to Like It: Label: Philadelphia International	—	—
1979	Strategy: Label: Philadelphia International	—	37
1981	I Never Had It So Good: Label: Becket Records; Only solo album released by Archie Bell	—	—
1990	Greatest Hits: Label: CBS Special Products; Best from the Philadelphia International era.	—	—
"—" denotes releases that did not chart or were not released.

=== Singles ===
Year	Single	Peak chart positions				Album
Year	Single	US HOT 100	US R&B	US Dance	UK	Album
1968	"Tighten Up"	1	1	—	55 (Note: Chart position is from the official UK "Breakers List".)	Tighten Up
1968	"I Can't Stop Dancing" (with Leon Huff and the Bobby Martin Orchestra)	9	5	—	—	I Can't Stop Dancing
1968	"Do the Choo Choo" (with Leon Huff and the Bobby Martin Orchestra)	44	17	—	—	I Can't Stop Dancing
1968	"Love Will Rain on You"	—	25	—	—	I Can't Stop Dancing
1968	"There's Gonna Be a Showdown" (with Thom Bell, Leon Huff and Bobby Martin's Orchestra)	21	6	—	36 (Note: "There's Gonna Be a Showdown" became a UK hit upon being re-released in January 1973.)	There's Gonna Be a Showdown
1969	"I Love My Baby" (with Thom Bell, Leon Huff and Bobby Martin's Orchestra)	94	40	—	—	There's Gonna Be a Showdown
1969	"Just a Little Closer"	128	—	—	—	There's Gonna Be a Showdown
1969	"Girl You're Too Young" (with Leon Huff and Thom Bell's Orchestra)	59	13	—	—	There's Gonna Be a Showdown
1969	"My Balloon's Going Up"	87	36	—	—	There's Gonna Be a Showdown
1969	"A World Without Music" (with the Roland Chambers' Orchestra)	90	46	—	—	Single only
1969	"Here I Go Again" (with Leon Huff and Thom Bell's Orchestra)	112	—	—	11 (Note: "Here I Go Again" became a UK hit upon being re-released in October 1972.)	There's Gonna Be a Showdown
1970	"Don't Let the Music Slip Away" (with the Roland Chambers' Orchestra)	100	—	—	—	Single only
1970	"Wrap It Up" (with the Wade Marcus Orchestra)	93	33	—	—	Single only
1973	"Dancing to Your Music"	61	11	—	—	Single only
1973	"Ain't Nothing for a Man in Love"	—	36	—	—	Single only
1973	"You Never Know What's on a Woman's Mind"	—	FLIP	—	—	Single only
1975	"I Could Dance All Night"	—	25	—	60	Dance Your Troubles Away
1975	"The Soul City Walk"	—	42	—	13	Dance Your Troubles Away
1976	"Let's Groove (Part 1)"	—	7	3	—	Dance Your Troubles Away
1976	"Don't Let Love Get You Down"	—	—	—	49 (Note: "Don't Let Love Get You Down" became a UK hit upon being re-released in June 1986.)	Where Will You Go When the Party's Over
1977	"Everybody Have a Good Time"	—	68	—	43	Where Will You Go When the Party's Over
1977	"Glad You Could Make It"	—	63	—	—	Hard Not to Like It
1978	"I've Been Missing You"	—	56	—	—	Hard Not to Like It
1979	"Strategy"	—	21	—	—	Strategy
1981	"Any Time Is Right" (Note: Only charting solo single for Archie Bell.)	—	49	53	—	I Never Had It So Good
"—" denotes releases that did not chart or were not released in that territory.

(Note: "Dance Your Troubles Away", while never released as a single, reached number 11 on the US Dance Chart in 1975.)

== See also ==
- List of soul musicians
- List of disco artists (A-E)
- List of artists who reached number one on the Hot 100 (U.S.)
- List of artists who reached number one on the Billboard R&B chart
- List of Soul Train episodes
- List of performers on Top of the Pops

== Other sources ==
- Whitburn, Joel (2011). Record Research Online Database. "Archie Bell" Billboard Chart Discography. Retrieved March 25, 2011.
