= The Jaggerz =

American rock band

- Also known as: The Jaggers; Jimmie Ross and the Jaggerz
- Origin: Pittsburgh, Pennsylvania, United States
- Genres: Rock, pop rock, blue-eyed soul
- Years active: 1964–1977, 1989–present
- Labels: Gamble Records (1968-1969); Kama Sutra Records (1969-1973); Wooden Nickel Records (1975-1976)
- Members: Jimmie Ross; Benny Faiella; Hermie Granati; Paul Martello; Chris Patarini; Dennis McAbee
- Past members: Donnie Iris; Bill Maybray; Thom Davies; Jim Pugliano; Larry Lorey; Frank Czuri
- Website: jaggerz.com

The Jaggerz are an American rock band from Pittsburgh. They came to national attention with their single "The Rapper" which was released on the Kama Sutra label. "The Rapper" was No. 1 in the Record World Charts and No. 2 in the Billboard Hot 100 in March 1970. Having sold over one million copies, the recording received a gold record awarded by the R.I.A.A.

The band's name derives from the Western Pennsylvania English term, "jagger," meaning any small, sharp-pointed object, typically thorns, spines, and prickles. They were managed by The Skyliners manager, Joe Rock.

== History ==
=== Early years and debut album (1964–1969) ===
While attending Slippery Rock State College, now known as Slippery Rock University, Donnie Iris (birth name Dominic Ierace) started a band called the Tri-Vels. The band became known as Donnie and the Donnells when the line up increased from three members to four. Shortly after dropping out of college, Iris found out that a band called Gary and the Jewel Tones of which Jimmie Ross was a member, needed a new guitarist. This gave birth to a new band called the "Jaggers". Forming around 1964, they began playing night clubs and other venues for the next few years gathering a respectable following in the region. The lineup consisted of Iris, Allen George, Benny Faiella, and Kenny Koodrich.

In 1968, the Jaggers signed with Gamble Records. The Philadelphia soul music team of Kenny Gamble and Leon Huff produced their debut album which was recorded in Philadelphia. While in the early stages of recording the album, Jimmie Ross saw a magazine advertisement featuring another band called "The Jaggers". In order to avoid confusion, manager Joe Rock suggested that the "s" in "Jaggers" be changed to a "z". In 1969, their debut album, Introducing the Jaggerz, was released. It is a blue-eyed soul album featuring the Jaggerz original song "(That's Why) Baby I Love You", the Ken Gamble tune "Together" and "Gotta Find My Way Back Home", written by Melvin & Mervin Steals who later wrote "Could It Be I'm Falling in Love" for the Spinners. Achieving most of its airplay in the group's native western Pennsylvania, it was a moderate success.

=== Second album and success with "The Rapper" (1970–1973) ===
In its November 22, 1969 article, Record World said that Buddah Records had reactivated its Kama Sutra label and The Jaggerz along with The Sir Men had been signed to Kama Sutra. So by 1970, the Jaggerz had left Gamble and signed with Neil Bogart's Kama Sutra label. There they recorded their second album, We Went to Different Schools Together, which was released in 1970.

One of the singles from We Went to Different Schools Together became the group's first chart-topping hit. "The Rapper", written by Donnie Iris, was released to the Pittsburgh market in December 1969. It quickly rose on the KQV Top 40 singles chart reaching No. 1 on the week of January 5, 1970. It was No. 1 on KQV for four straight weeks during January 1970. Released nationally "The Rapper" reached No. 2 on the Billboard Hot 100 on March 21, 1970. It was on the Hot 100 chart for 13 weeks and was certified gold by the RIAA. Another track from the album reached the Hot 100: "I Call My Baby Candy" peaked at No. 75 and "What A Bummer" (a non-album track) climbed to No. 88. The album went to No. 62 on the Billboard Top 200 chart. The album’s classic R&B tune "Memoirs of a Traveler" written by Benny Faiella and Donnie Iris was sampled by Wiz Khalifa, The Game, Slum Village and seven other hip hop artists.

The Jaggerz continued to release singles through Kama Sutra until 1973, when they moved to the RCA subsidiary Wooden Nickel Records. In 1973, the Jaggerz performed on the Wolfman Jack novelty album Through The Ages that was released on Wooden Nickel Records. They backed up DJ Wolfman Jack on ten songs including "The Rapper". The Jaggerz also produced and recorded with Bobby Rydell and James Darren.

=== Third album, new lineup and disbandment (1974–1977) ===
Singers Bill Maybray and Jimmie Ross left the Jaggerz. Ross was recruited by the Jaggerz manager Joe Rock to join the Skyliners. Keyboard player and singer Frank Czuri and songwriter/keyboard player Hermie Granati joined the band for the album Come Again that was released by Wooden Nickel Records in 1975. The single "2 + 2 / Don't It Make You Wanna Dance" was also released in 1975 but did not reach the charts. The Jaggerz were dropped from Wooden Nickel in 1976.

Sometime after being dropped from Wooden Nickel, the Jaggerz' original band members began leaving. By late 1977, Benny Faiella was the only original member left. He was joined by Gene and Robert Vallecorsa (lead guitar and keyboards, respectively), Sam Ippolito (lead vocals), and Mark Zeppuhar (saxophone). Even though they were now only playing at nightclubs, Faiella believed that the lineup was the strongest it had been in twelve years and that they would return to the charts. However this proved not to be and the Jaggerz finally broke up around 1977.

=== Separate projects (1978–1988) ===
Dominic Ierace, the band's guitarist and vocalist, joined Wild Cherry. By 1976, they had been together for six years and had just recently risen to prominence with "Play That Funky Music." While in the group, Ierace met keyboardist Mark Avsec. Ierace (continuing to use his "Donnie Iris" nickname more and more) engineered Wild Cherry's third album I Love My Music and appeared playing guitar on their fourth album Only the Wild Survive. But Wild Cherry's fate seemed to be similar to the Jaggerz and they broke up in 1979. Iris then went solo with the help of Avsec, first with the non-album singles "Bring on the Eighties" and "Because of You." These singles proved to be of little influence and Avsec and Iris decided to put a band together. The lineup consisted of Iris, Avsec, Marty Lee Hoenes, Albritton McClain, and Kevin Valentine. The new band, called Donnie Iris and the Cruisers, released their first album in 1980, Back on the Streets. The album's first single, "Ah! Leah!", began a series of successful albums and singles. Iris had 10 singles in Billboard top 100 lists. He released ten albums with the Cruisers, five of which made it to the Billboard top 200 list. Donnie Iris and the Cruisers are still together to this day.

Ross joined the Skyliners in 1975 after two of the original members left. Joe Rock, who managed both the Jaggerz and Skyliners, advised Ross to leave the Jaggerz. He sang with the Skyliners original members Jimmy Beaumont and Janet Vogel. The Skyliners appeared in 1950s revival shows around the country. In 1977, Ross recorded with the Skyliners on their Tortoise International Records album release titled “The Skyliners”. Singer Cathy Cooper joined the Skyliners after the death of Vogel in 1980. Ross sang with the Skyliners through 1982. In 1982 Cooper and Ross left the Skyliners to form the singing duo Cooper and Ross. They signed with Sweet City Records / MCA and released the album "Bottom Line". Cooper and Ross became a fixture in the Atlantic City casinos with a 36-week appearance at the Trump Plaza and extended engagements at Harrah's. They worked together for five years.

Frank Czuri became the lead singer for the CBS recording act the Silencers who appeared on the first ever broadcast of MTV. In 1980 the Silencers single "Shiver and Shake" reached number 81 on the Billboard Hot 100 chart. Hermie Granati formed the Granati Brothers, recorded the 1979 album G-Force on A&M Records and opened 78 shows for Van Halen during the early 1980s. Drummer James Pugliano toured and recorded with Leon Russell, Roger Miller, J.J. Cale, Willie Nelson, and Mel Tillis.

=== Regrouping (1989) ===
The original members (sans Iris) reunited in 1989 to perform live. The reunited band included the original members Pugliano, Faiella, and Maybray along with organist Fred Dulu, sax player Robbie Klein and vocalist Donnie Marsico. Their first appearance was at a 25-year reunion concert on June 23, 1989, at the Beaver County College Golden Dome. The band with differing line-ups has played 20 to 25 shows a year since then.

=== And the Band Played On (1998) ===
The Jaggerz released their fifth album, And the Band Played On... in 1998. AllMusic said it was "heartfelt soul music". Performing on the release were Ross, Faiella, Pugliano, Dennis McAbee, and Jamie Peck. Granati rejoined the band writing the orchestrations, performing on keyboards and vocals, and co-producing the album with Ross.

=== Re-Rapped by Request (2001) ===
The Jaggerz released their sixth album Re-Rapped by Request in 2001. It features a mix of the most requested songs that they have performed over their career including "Dancin' in the Streets", "Some Kind of Wonderful", "The Love I Never Had" and a live version of the "Rapper" recorded at the A.J. Palumbo Center.

=== "Memoirs of the Traveler" ===
The melody of "Memoirs of the Traveler" from the Jaggerz' album We Went to Different Schools Together has been sampled by various hip hop artists. In 2008, rap artist The Game released a track "Letter to the King", produced by Hi-Tek, from his album, LAX, that sampled the song. Other hip hop musicians who have sampled the song on their releases include Rollin' Up by Curren$y and Wiz Khalifa (2009), 1, 2 by Slum Village (2005) Dilated Peoples in the 1990s and, more recently, Pede B (Denmark).

=== Membership changes ===
Original lead vocalist and bass player Maybray (born William R. Maybray on May 14, 1944) died on December 5, 2004, at age 60. He wrote and sang the group's debut single, "That's Why Baby I Love You". The original drummer Pugliano (born James Pugliano on December 4, 1946) died on June 15, 2010, at age 63.

Original members Ross and Faiella continue to perform as members of the Jaggerz. The current roster of the Jaggerz also includes vocalist and keyboardist Granati, guitarist McAbee, saxophonist Chris Patarini, and drummer Paul Martello.

==== The Walk (2014) ====
In 2014, The Jaggerz returned to their blue-eyed soul roots releasing the album The Walk. Led by singer Ross, the Jaggerz brought their five part harmonies to the arrangements of eight R&B classics and two updated recordings from their 1969 Introducing the Jaggerz album: the Gamble & Huff tune Together and The Jaggerz original That's Why Baby I Love You. Ross' voice and the Jaggerz harmonies appear on the love ballads Love Won't Let Me Wait, The Whole Town's Laughing at Me and That's Why Baby I Love You. Donna Groom, of the Skyliners, guest stars on a duet with Ross on the medley arrangement of It's Gonna Take a Miracle/ I'm On The Outside. Five time Grammy winning producer/engineer Jay Dudt of Audile Images engineered the album for co-producers Granati and Ross.

== Members ==
=== Current ===
- Jimmie Ross - lead vocals, bass guitar (1965–1976; 1989–present)
- Benny Faiella - guitar (1965–1977; 1989–present)
- Hermie Granati - keyboards, vocals, arrangements (1975–1976, 1998–2003, present)
- Buddy Schneider - guitar
- Paul Martello - drums, percussion, vocals
- Chris Patarini - saxophone, trumpet, percussion, vocals

=== Former ===
- Dominic Ierace - guitar, lead vocals (1965–1976; died 2026)
- Bill Maybray - bass, vocals (1965–1973; died 2004)
- Thom Davies - piano, organ (1965–1973)
- Kenny Koodrich - drums (1965)
- Jim Pugliano - drums (1965–1976; 1989–1998; died 2010)
- Frank Czuri - keyboards (1973–1976)
- Sam Ippolito - lead vocals (1976–1977)
- Gene Vallecorsa - guitar (1976–1977)
- Robert Vallecorsa - keyboards (1976–1977)
- Mark Zeppuhar - saxophone (1976-1977)
- Ron Levi - trumpet
- Rich Mansfield - sax
- Mike Caporizzo - sax

== Discography ==
=== Albums ===
- 1969 - Introducing the Jaggerz (Gamble GS-5006)
- 1970 - We Went to Different Schools Together (Kama Sutra KSBS-2017) US No. 62
- 1975 - Come Again (Wooden Nickel BWL1-0772)
- 1998 - And the Band Played On...
- 2001 - Re-Rapped by Request
- 2014 - The Walk

=== Singles ===
- 1966 - "Feel So Good" / "Cry" (Executive) (released as "The Jaggers")
- 1968 - "(That’s Why) Baby I Love You" / "Bring It Back" (Gamble G-218)
- 1969 - "Gotta Find My Way Back Home" / "Forever Together, Together Forever" (Gamble G226)
- 1969 - "Together" / "Let Me Be Your Man" (Gamble G238)
- 1970 - "Higher And Higher" / "Ain't No Sun (Since You've Been Gone)" (Gamble G 4008)
- 1970 - "The Rapper" / "Born Poor" (Kama Sutra KA 502) US No. 2, CAN No. 3, AUS No. 32
- 1970 - "I Call My Baby Candy" / "Will She Believe Me?" (Kama Sutra KA 509) US No. 75, CAN No. 47
- 1970 - "What a Bummer" / "Memories Of The Traveler" (Kama Sutra KA 513) US No. 88
- 1971 - "Need Your Love" / "Here's a Heart" (Gamble G 4012)
- 1971 - "Let's Talk About Love" / "I'll Never Forget You" (Kama Sutra KA 517)
- 1971 - "Wise Up!-Why Dope?" (The Pennsylvania Jaycees JZ 550)
- 1973 - "Ain't That Sad" / "Let's Talk About Love" (Kama Sutra KA 583)
- 1974 - "The Streaker" / "The Streaker (Part 2)" (Jaggerz JZ101)
- 1974 - "I Can't Make It Without You" / "A Certain Girl" (Jaggerz JZ102)
- 1975 - "2 + 2" / "Don't It Make You Wanna Dance" (Wooden Nickel WB-10194)
- 2014 - "The Walk" (JRD Records)

== See also ==
- List of 1970s one-hit wonders in the United States
