= Jumping Jack Flash (tribute band) =

Rolling Stones tribute band

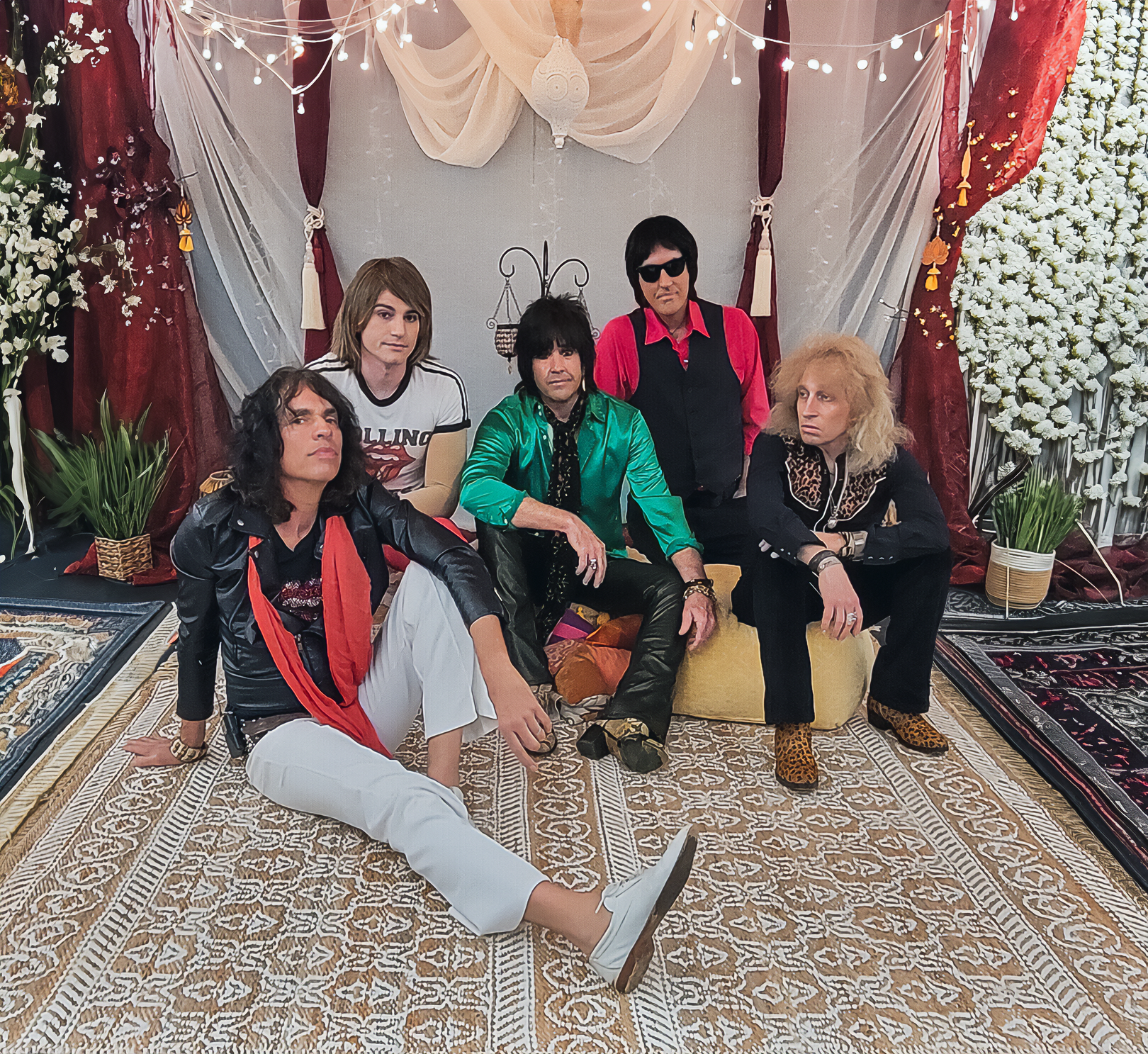
- Jumping Jack Flash: (left to right) Joey Infante, Jon McCracken, Young Hutchison, Matt Quilter, and David A. Williams

Background information
- Also known as: JJF
- Origin: San Clemente, CA
- Years active: 2005 - present
- Members: Main cast: Joey Infante; Young Hutchison; Jon McCracken; Matt Quilter; David A. Williams; Alternates/Auxiliary cast: Matt Kalin; Jeff Dellisanti; Albert Laroche; Christian Hernandez; Pat Hennessy; Rio Infante; Zoe Infante
- Past members: Todd Loweth; Gary Roach; John Burton; Jill Hennessy; Kit Potamkin; Mike Adams
- Website: www.JumpingJackFlash.us

Jumping Jack Flash is a Rolling Stones tribute band based in Southern California. Founded in 2005 by Keith Richards impersonator, Young Hutchison, they have performed throughout the United States and internationally.

The band’s early lineup was Young Hutchison, Pat Hennessy as Brian Jones and Ronnie Wood, Gary Roach as Charlie Watts, John Burton as Bill Wyman, and Mike Adams as Mick Jagger. The beginning performances took place throughout Southern California including their very first in January 2005 at the now-closed Freighthouse Saloon in San Juan Capistrano, CA. They soon got a residency at The Renaissance (now Stillwater Spirits & Sounds) in Dana Point, CA, where they built their look, sound, and fan base. Todd Loweth eventually replaced Adams to perform as Mick Jagger for the band.

On July 28, 2011, Jumping Jack Flash teamed up with Beatles tribute The Fab Four (tribute) to perform the original Beatles vs. Stones show at the Pacific Amphitheater in Costa Mesa, CA. This show continues to tour around North America as “Beatles vs. Stones: The Greatest Show that Never Was!” with Jumping Jack Flash as The Rolling Stones and Sgt. Pepper as The Beatles.

In the summer of 2012, after singer Todd Loweth died, the band’s role of Mick Jagger was filled by Joey Infante (aka “Joey Jagger”), a career bassist turned lead singer, who performed with many bands throughout his career including the 80s rock band Roxanne who reached #63 in the Billboard Hot 100 with their cover of “Play That Funky Music” by Wild Cherry.

Gary Roach and John Burton left the band due to musical differences at the beginning of 2014, and the roles of Charlie Watts and Bill Wyman were filled by Los Angeles drummer Jon McCracken, and bassist/guitarist Matt Quilter whose brother Pat Quilter co-founded the pro-audio company QSC, as well as Quilter Labs. Original member Pat Hennessy had to step back from performing full-time with Jumping Jack Flash due to health problems in 2018. Today, guitarist David Williams performs with the band as Mick Taylor and Ronnie Wood.

In the past decade, Jumping Jack Flash began to headline larger and iconic venues including the Star of the Desert Arena in Primm, NV, the Winspear Centre in Edmonton, Canada, and the Avalon Hollywood Theater where the real Rolling Stones performed for the first time on US television for the show The Hollywood Palace on June 6, 1964.

Jumping Jack Flash continues to perform regularly in and out of the US. Aside from their Rolling Stones show, they also perform their Beatles vs. Stones show, and Stones & Stewart featuring Martin Andrew as Rod Stewart. They also occasionally perform in another Beatles and Stones show called “Beatles vs. Stones: a Musical Showdown” featuring Beatles tribute Abbey Road.

== Cast ==
- Joey Infante as Mick Jagger
- Young Hutchison as Keith Richards
- Jon McCracken as Charlie Watts
- Matt Quilter as Bill Wyman
- David Williams as Brian Jones, Mick Taylor, and Ronnie Wood
