= 2001 Club =

U.S. chain of franchised disco nightclubs

The 2001 Club was a chain of franchised disco nightclubs begun in the Pittsburgh area in 1972 that eventually grew to one of the most successful disco franchises in the country.

== Concept and development ==
The original club was opened and developed by Thomas Jayson as a prototype, with the intention of franchising the concept in suburban shopping centers. Located on General Robinson Street on Pittsburgh's North Side, the club's first location boasted a 16,000 square foot dance floor. The 2001 Club was not related to the Brooklyn 2001 Odyssey disco featured in the film Saturday Night Fever and in the source material for the film, Tribal Rites of the New Saturday Night. At that time, disco had already begun to pass its peak in popularity in urban centers, but Jayson saw an opportunity to mass-market the concept in suburban areas. Parris Westbrook was brought on as General Manager (GM). By 1978, there were ten locations, and six more locations were to be opened the following year, with 200 franchise applications. The plan was to have 150 franchises by 1980, with expected earnings to reach $3 million that year, at which point Jayson planned to take the company public. At that time, the franchise fee was $35,000, plus six percent of gross revenues. The company also provided design, construction, furnishings and management as part of the franchise concept, with tight control over concept and programming. The total cost of opening a new location at the time was $500,000.

The 2001 clubs were the most prolific chain of disco clubs in the country, and many other clubs, opening in hotel and restaurant locations, aspired to match the mass-market appeal of 2001. Although many other attempts were made to franchise disco clubs, 2001 was the only one to successfully do so in this time frame.

The 2001 club eventually reached approximately 25 cities, and were successful in each location. Billboard magazine called the 2001 clubs "probably the most successful and truest form of disco franchises in the country". In the book Hot Stuff: Disco and the Remaking of American Culture, author Alice Echols wrote that Jayson "came the closest to franchising his disco into the McDonald's of the glitter-ball world. Jayson's goal was to bring disco to the American shopping center." By 1980, with 25 locations operating, 2001 began construction of larger clubs in downtown Harrisburg, Pennsylvania, Cincinnati and Dayton, with a fourth planned for Pittsburgh. This was a change in strategy from building in suburban shopping malls, to accommodate a larger floor plan in downtown areas, with the cost of a location increasing to the $500,000-$1,000,000 range. The larger clubs were called "V.I.P Clubs". The company also signed up regional master franchises in Massachusetts, Connecticut, North Carolina, South Carolina, Ohio, Pennsylvania, and Washington DC, with master franchises pending in California and Florida. The clubs were extensively advertised on a regional and national basis.

In addition to recorded music, the clubs also featured live music. The acts appearing included dance music such as Grace Jones and The Village People, but also non-disco groups such as Little Feat and Bonnie Raitt. The band Wild Cherry frequently played at the 2001 Club in North Pittsburgh, and the song Play That Funky Music was written at that club in 1976. After a patron said to the drummer during a break, "Are you going to play some funky music, white boys?" band leader Rob Parissi wrote the song on a bar order pad in about five minutes. Fred Schneider stated that the B-52's song "Rock Lobster" was inspired by the Atlanta 2001 Club which, instead of a light show, projected a slide show with pictures of puppies, babies, and lobsters on a grill.

== Decline ==
By the late 1980s the popularity of the clubs had declined with the decline in the popularity of disco, and some closed, such as the Rochester, New York club in 1989. Others, including some of the rebranded V.I.P. clubs, were still in operation as of 2016. The Myrtle Beach 2001 Club continued in operation for over three decades until 2018.
