= Only the Wild Survive =

Studio album by Wild Cherry
- Released: May 1979
- Genre: Funk, funk rock
- Length: 38:57
- Label: Epic
- Producer: Rick Hall

Wild Cherry chronology
I Love My Music (1978)	Only the Wild Survive (1979)	Play the Funk (2000)

Only the Wild Survive is the fourth and final studio album by Wild Cherry, released in 1979. It contains the single "Keep On Playin' That Funky Music" a sequel to their 1976 hit "Play That Funky Music". It was also the first and only Wild Cherry album to feature Donnie Iris (formerly of the Jaggerz) as a performer. After Wild Cherry's breakup, Iris and bandmate Mark Avsec would launch Donnie Iris and the Cruisers.

== Critical reception ==
Professional ratings
Review scores
Source	Rating
AllMusic	2/5 stars

The Ottawa Journal noted that "the band has become firmly established as a funk band prone to writing songs that regularly sound the same as 'Play That Funky Music'."

== Track listing ==
1. "Try a Piece of My Love" (James Robert Barrett, Mark Cunningham) - 4:28
2. "Look at Her Dance" (Russ Ballard) - 4:40
3. "Don't Wait Too Long" (Robert Parissi) - 5:50
4. "Starlight" (Parissi) - 4:25
5. "Hold On to Your Hiney" (Tony Joe White) - 4:15
6. "All Night's All Right" (Dean Parks) - 3:50
7. "Raindance" (Billy Burnette, Larry Henley) - 3:26
8. "Take Me Back" (Mark Avsec, Parissi) - 4:10
9. "Keep On Playin' That Funky Music" (Harrison Calloway, Clarence Jones, Parissi) - 3:55

== Personnel ==
- Robert Parissi – lead guitar, lead vocals
- Donnie Iris – guitar, vocals
- Mark Avsec – keyboards, vocals
- Cooke Michalchick – bass
- Ron Beitle – drums, vocals
