= And the Band Played On (disambiguation) =

And the band played on is an expression used to describe the deliberate masking or downplaying of an impending calamity by authorities, often attributed in reference to the band that played during the sinking of the Titanic.

The expression is reflected in:

== Films ==
- And the Band Played On (film), a 1993 American television film docudrama based on Randy Shilts' book

== Literature ==
- And the Band Played On: People, Politics, and the AIDS Epidemic (1987), a nonfiction book by Randy Shilts
- And the Band Played On...: The Titanic Violinist and the Glovemaker: A True Story of Love, Loss and Betrayal (2011), a nonfiction book by Christopher Ward
- The Band that Played On: The Extraordinary Story of the 8 Musicians Who Went Down with the Titanic (2011), a nonfiction book by Steve Turner
- "And the Band Played On: The Band's Tale," a short story set in the Star Wars universe, printed in the anthology Tales from Jabba's Palace (1995), about Max Rebo and his band.

== Music ==
=== Albums ===
- And the Band Played On... (album), a 1998 album by The Jaggerz

=== Songs ===
- "The Band Played On" (1895), a song that popularized the phrase in its chorus
- "Ball of Confusion" (1970), a song by The Temptations that repeatedly mentions the phrase
- The Band Plays On (1975), the debut album from Back Street Crawler
- And the Bands Played On (1981), a song by Saxon
- "And the Band Played On" (1995), a song by Simple Minds from Good News from the Next World

== Episodes ==
- And the Band Played On, a Shining Time Station 1989 episode
