= Jimmie Ross =

American rock guitarist and vocalist

Jimmie Ross is an American rock guitarist and vocalist who is best known for being a member of Pittsburgh band the Jaggerz, known for their 1970 hit "The Rapper". During the band's initial existence of 1965-1976, the bassist shared the duties of lead vocalist with guitarist Donnie Iris. By the time the Jaggerz regrouped in 1989, Iris was well into his solo career, and Ross became the sole lead vocalist and remained bassist. He continues to hold both positions today.

Before the Jaggerz, Ross was a member of a band called Gary and the Jewel Tones. Members of this band merged with members of Donnie and the Donnelles to form The Jaggerz.

During the years of the Jaggerz' split, Ross was a member of The Skyliners and then Cooper & Ross.

In 2010, he released his first solo album, Full Circle, which contained covers of Jaggerz songs.

== Discography ==
=== With the Jaggerz ===
- Introducing the Jaggerz, 1969
- We Went to Different Schools Together, 1970
- Come Again, 1975
- And the Band Played On..., 1998
- Re-Rapped by Request, 2001

=== Cooper & Ross ===
- Bottom Line, 1982

=== Solo ===
- Full Circle, 2010
