= Altamont, Ohio =

- Unincorporated community
- Location within Ohio
- Coordinates: 40°20′00″N 80°37′03″W
- Country: United States
- State: Ohio
- Counties: Jefferson
- Elevation: 1,132 ft (345 m)
- Time zone: UTC-5 (Eastern (EST))
  - Summer (DST): UTC-4 (EDT)
- ZIP code: 43938
- Area code: 740
- GNIS feature ID: 1064315

Altamont (previously known as Altamont Hill or Altamont Park) is an unincorporated community in Steubenville Township, Jefferson County, Ohio, United States. It is located south of Steubenville and just east of Hillsboro along Wilson Avenue.

== History ==
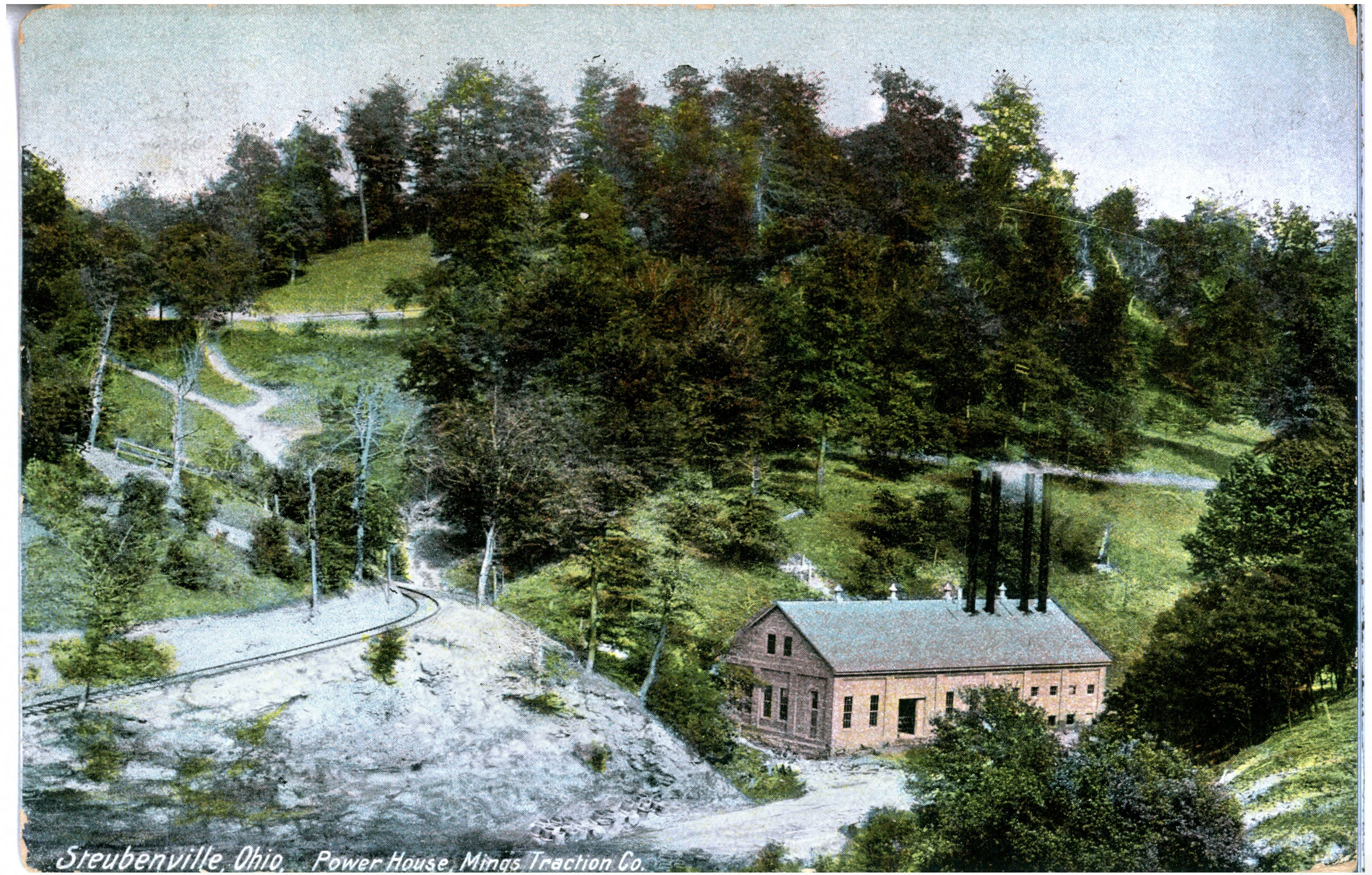
A 1909 print shows the trolley power station and trolley car tracks ascending the hill towards Altamont Park

The community was originally laid out in 23 lots on top of a local hill, the name "Altamont Hill" dating back to before the Civil War. In 1899, the Steubenville, Mingo & Ohio Valley Traction Company (later the Steubenville & Wheeling Traction Company) built an electric street railroad from Steubenville to Brilliant and Mingo Junction going over Altamont Hill (with a station in the Atlamont community). The Altamont line was rarely used though, due to the high grade, and after seven years was abandoned in favor of a lower grade junction that was built around the hill.

Altamont Park was a small Trolley Park on the northern hilltop of Altamont around the turn of the 19th century, where WTOV TV9 (previously WSTV) currently sits.

=== Baseball ===
Altamont holds historical significance in the realm of sports. On October 12, 1905, the Pittsburgh Pirates, featuring baseball legend Honus Wagner, played an exhibition game against the Steubenville Business College at Altamont Park. Despite wintry weather, over 500 fans attended, witnessing the Pirates' 5–3 victory. Impressed by the local team's performance, Wagner agreed to a rematch eight days later, resulting in a 7–3 win for the Pirates.
