= We Went to Different Schools Together =

Studio album by The Jaggerz
- Released: 1970
- Genre: Rock, pop
- Label: Kama Sutra Records
- Producer: Sixuvus Productions

The Jaggerz chronology
Introducing the Jaggerz (1969)	We Went to Different Schools Together (1970)	Come Again (1975)

Professional ratings
Review scores
Source	Rating
Allmusic	3/5 stars
Christgau's Record Guide	C−

We Went to Different Schools Together is the second album by Pittsburgh rock/pop band the Jaggerz, released in 1970. The album includes the group's only successful single, "The Rapper." The lead track "I Call My Baby Candy" peaked at #75 on the Billboard Hot 100 the week of May 23, 1970, the last of three weeks it spent on that chart.

== Track listing ==
1. "I Call My Baby Candy" (Ierace)
2. "Memoirs of the Traveler" (Rock, Ierace, Faiella)
3. "With a Little Help from My Friends" (Lennon, McCartney)
4. "Looking Glass" (Rock, Ierace, Faiella)
5. "The Rapper" (Ierace)
6. "At My Window" (Rock, Ierace)
7. "Things Gotta Get Better" (Rock, Davies, Maybray)
8. "Carousel" (Rock, Davies, Pugliano)
9. "Don't Make My Sky Cry" (Rock, Davies, Maybray)
10. "That's My World" (Rock, Davies)

== Personnel ==
- Dominic Ierace - guitar, bass, trumpet, vocals
- Jimmie Ross - tube, trombone, bass, vocals
- Benny Faiella - guitar, bass, background vocals
- Thom Davies - organ, piano, trumpet
- Billy Maybray - bass, drums, vocals
- Jim Pugliano - drums, background vocals
