= Electrified Funk =

Studio album by Wild Cherry
- Released: April 1977
- Recorded: Columbia 30th Street (New York City)
- Genre: Funk rock, rock
- Length: 37:20
- Label: Epic
- Producer: Robert Parissi

Wild Cherry chronology
Wild Cherry (1976)	Electrified Funk (1977)	I Love My Music (1978)

Professional ratings
Review scores
Source	Rating
Allmusic	3/5 stars

Electrified Funk is the second studio album by the funk rock band Wild Cherry, released in 1977. It contains the track "Baby Don't You Know", which roughly continues the theme and story of their 1976 hit "Play That Funky Music" by effectively explaining that, contrary to popular belief, all of the band's members were white despite its typically-Black funk/R&B sound. The song peaked at number 43 on the Billboard Hot 100 and became their second-highest charting hit. It also contains a repeat of a song from the first album, "Hold On (With Strings)", this time with added violins.

== Track listing ==
All tracks composed by Rob Parissi; except "It's All Up to You" by Alvin Fields and Michael Zager.

Side one
No.	Title	Length
1.	"Baby Don't You Know"	4:24
2.	"Are You Boogieing Around on Your Daddy"	2:56
3.	"Dancin' Music Band"	3:11
4.	"Put Yourself in My Shoes"	4:20
5.	"Closest Thing to My Mind"	4:17

Side two
No.	Title	Length
6.	"Electrified Funk"	3:40
7.	"Hole in the Wall"	3:55
8.	"Hot to Trot"	3:15
9.	"Hold On (With Strings)"	4:04
10.	"It's All Up to You"	3:18

== Personnel ==
- Robert Parissi – lead guitar, lead vocals
- Allen Wentz – bass guitar, synthesizer, vocals
- Ronald Beitle – drums, vocals
- Mark Avsec – keyboards
- Bryan Bassett – lead guitar, vocals
