= Come Again (The Jaggerz album) =

Studio album by the Jaggerz
- Released: 1975
- Studio: Quantum Recording Studios, Torrance California
- Genre: Rock, pop
- Label: Wooden Nickel Records
- Producer: Don Sciarrotta, Tony Sciarrotta, Jim Golden, the Jaggerz

The Jaggerz chronology
| We Went to Different Schools Together (1970) | Come Again (1975) | And the Band Played On... (1998) |

Professional ratings
Review scores
| Source | Rating |
|---|---|
| The Encyclopedia of Popular Music | 2/5 stars |

Come Again is the third album by the Pittsburgh pop/rock band the Jaggerz, released in 1975. This was the group's last album before its twelve-year (1977-1989) break-up; another album was not released for 23 years. It is also the group's last album with Donnie Iris as a performer.

== Track listing ==
1. "I'll Be Okay in the Morning" (H. Granati, L. Ierace)
2. "Love Music" (D. Lambert, B. Potter)
3. "Satisfaction Guaranteed" (D. Ierace, J. Ross, E. Faiella, F. Czuri, T. Elliot)
4. "It's Me" (C. Sciarrotta)
5. "Gotta Find My Way Back Home" (M. & M. Steals)
6. "High Heel Rockin' Roll Shoes" (C. Sciarrotta, D. Sciarrotta)
7. "Shame On You" (C. Sciarotta, D. Sciarrotta)
8. "Don't It Make You Wanna Dance" (D. Sciarrotta, Jim Golden, L. Ierace)
9. "2 + 2" (M. Davis, M. James)
10. "It's Better to Have and Don't Need (Than to Need and Don't Have)" (D. Covay)

== Personnel ==
- Dominic Ierace - guitar, vocals
- Jimmie Ross - bass guitar, vocals
- Benny Faiella - guitar
- Frank Czuri - keyboards
- Jim Pugliano - drums
