= The Sermon (band) =

American rock band

- Also known as: The Sir-Men, The Sir Men
- Years active: Late 1960s to early 1970s
- Labels: Thunderbird; Kama Sutra
- Past members: Jimmy Cox; Kal Dee; Dave Novak; Bob Papaleoni; Bob Stasko; Bill Weiss; Bill Wolfe

The Sermon were a rock band from Syracuse, New York that lasted from the late 1960s to early 1970s. They are known for their 1969 hit "Never Gonna Find Another Love" which was released on the Kama Sutra record label. They re-united decades later.

== Background ==
Formed in mid-1968 and managed by George Plavocos who was a disc jockey with WNDR-AM 1260, they started out as The Sermon and were signed to Transcontinent Records in Buffalo. However, due to an issue involving another New York group with the same name, they had to change their name to The Sir Men. Later they signed to Thunderbird Records they signed as The Sir Men. Later on they would change back to The Sermon. They were made up of experienced musicians who had played and recorded in other bands. Kal Dee was the lead singer of a Cortland band, Kal Dee & the Showmen who recorded a single, "Mind Your Mama" bw "I'm Still in Love With You", released on Lawn Records in 1963. He had also played keyboards with Don Barber & The Dukes on their recordings, "The Waddle" bw "What Your Name" which was released on Thunderbird in 1965.

Dave Novak, Bill Weiss and Bill Wolfe had been in The Nightcaps who had released the single "Keep on Runnin" bw "Knock On Wood" in 1967.

== History ==
The group played at clubs in Rochester and Buffalo. They also did college parties around the area. They also played venues such as the Campus Inn, Red Dog Saloon and the Holiday Bowl. In 1969 the band had their single "You're Never Gonna Find Another Love" bw What A Day This Could Be" released on Thunderbird 520. The A side was written by Mickey Nicotra and the B side by Carl Falso and Mike Anthony. Both sides were produced by Bruce Dedrick. In addition to production, the background vocals were provided by members of the Dedrick family. On August 16, the record was listed as a pick for the Hot 100 by Billboard in its "Other Picks" section. The Thunderbird single was referred to as a listenable ditty with teen appeal and got a four star rating by Record World in its September 27 issue.

=== Signed to Kama Sutra ===
In its November 22 article, Record World stated that Buddah Records had reactivated its Kama Sutra label and along with The Jaggerz, The Sermon (referred to as The Sir Men) had been signed to Kama Sutra. The master of their single had been acquired from Thunderbird by promotion director Marty Thau and the single was to appear on Kama Sutra. This came about as a result of the group being discovered by Buddah's mid-West operations manager, Jack Hakim. By 1970, and now credited to The Sermon, the single was released on Kama Sutra KA 501. Due to lack of promotion by their label, who were concentrating on other artists, including Morris Levy promoting "The Rapper" by The Jaggerz over their single, the group broke up in January 1970. A review of the single in the January 31 issue of Cashbox said that the single had a sound that demands a second listen and could crop up in the Top 40 with little difficulty. By April, 1970, the record was at #7, just ahead of Aretha Franklin's "Call Me" in the Record World "ONE STOP Top Ten" chart. For two weeks in September, it was #1 on the WOLF-AM weekly vinyl survey. It also hung around in the local chart for nine weeks along with the national hits.

=== Following the break up in January, 1970 ===
In April, Kal Dee having left the group and was appearing with his group, The Kal Dee Trio at venues. In May, they were playing at the Syracuse Motor Inn's Cavalier Room.

== Later years ==
Some years after their break up, a compilation album, History of Syracuse Music Volume 3 & 4 was released. It included a demo the group had recorded for their follow up single. The song was a Carl Falso composition, "It Almost Made Me Cry".

In 2016, Dave Novak released his first CD album which included covers of classics and his own compositions.

=== Reunion ===
In June, 2016, original members Jimmy Cox, Dave Novak, Bill Weiss, Bob Stasko and Bob Papaleoni reunited to perform at Pensebene's Casa Grande on State Fair Blvd. Jimmy Johns was on drums as original drummer Billy Wolfe had since passed away.

== Members ==
- Kal Dee ... vocals, trumpet, piano
- Jimmy Cox ... Hammond B-3 organ
- Dave Novak ... guitar, vocals
- Bob Stasko ... sax, flute, maracas, vocals
- Bob Papaleoni ... drums
- Bill Weiss ... bass
- Bill Wolfe ... drums, vocals

=== Additional ===
- Frankie Grasso ... trumpet
- Steve Weinstein ... trombone
- Pete Kanyuk ... sax

== Discography ==
Singles
| Act | Release | Catalogue | Year | Notes # |
|---|---|---|---|---|
| The Sir Men | "You're Never Gonna Find Another Love" / "What A Day This Could Be" | Thunderbird TH 520 A | 1969 | |
| The Sermon | "You're Never Gonna Find Another Love" / "What A Day This Could Be" | Kama Sutra KA 501 | 1970 | |

EP
| Act | Release | Catalogue | Year | Notes # |
|---|---|---|---|---|
| The Jaggerz The Sermon | "The Rapper", "Born Poor" "What A Day This Could Be", "You´re Never Gonna Find Another Love" | Kama Sutra 617 104 | 1970 | Portugal release |

Compilation appearance
| Act | Release | Catalogue | Year | Featured track | Notes # |
|---|---|---|---|---|---|
| The History Of Syracuse Music Volume I The Groups - 1958-1970 | Various artists | ECEIP PSLP 1005 | | "You're Never Gonna Find Another Love" | |
| The History Of Syracuse Music Volume III & IV | Various artists | ECEIP PSLP 1007-1010 | | "What A Day This Could Be", "It Almost Makes Me Cry" | |
| Oldies I Forgot To Buy | Various artists | Forevermore FVR 5008 | 1995 | "You're Never Gonna Find Another Love" | |
