= The Skyliners =

American doo-wop group

- Origin: Pittsburgh, Pennsylvania, U.S.
- Genre: Doo-wop
- Years active: 1958–1966, 1974–present
- Labels: Calico, Colpix, Jubilee, Original Sound, Kama Sutra
- Members: Donna Groom; Eric Bruce; John Sarkis; Mark Groom (drummer); Jim Gregorakis
- Past members: Jimmy Beaumont; Wally Lester; Jackie Taylor; Joe Verscharen; Janet Vogel Rapp; Jack Gardner; Sammy Mauro; Rick Morris; Jack O'Neil; Elaine Sofocle; Thom Davies; Robert Peckman; Cathy Cooper; Jimmie Ross; Bob Sholes; Paul Conners; Nick Pociask; David Proch; Frank Czuri; Terry Groom; Dale Groom

The Skyliners are an American doo-wop group from Pittsburgh. The original lineup was: Jimmy Beaumont (lead), Janet Vogel Rapp (soprano), Wally Lester (tenor), Jackie Taylor (bass voice, guitarist), Joe Verscharen (baritone). The Skyliners were best known for their 1959 hit "Since I Don't Have You".

== History ==
The Skyliners also hit the top 40 with "This I Swear" and "Pennies from Heaven". Other classics include "It Happened Today" (1959), "Close Your Eyes" (1961), and "Comes Love" (1962). The original group dissolved in 1963, but re-united eleven years later (without Jackie Taylor), for what would become their last charted record, "Where Have They Gone?"

In 1965, Jimmy Beaumont recorded two notable singles for the Bang label: the first record, "Tell Me"/"I Feel Like I'm Falling in Love", had medium-tempo soul-styled tracks.

For his second Bang 45, "You Got Too Much Going for You"/"I Never Loved Her Anyway", Beaumont transformed into an impressive soul singer, sounding nothing like his previous, more pop-styled efforts. It led some to question in later years, if it actually was his singing. These two tracks are now considered Northern Soul collectibles. The single was also issued on UK London HLZ 10059 in 1966.

Jackie Taylor was drafted into the U.S. Army about 1965. In 1975 Wally Lester and Joe Versharen left the group; they were replaced by new members, Jimmie Ross and Bob Sholes.

In 1978, the Detroit-based record producer Don Davis — who produced Marilyn McCoo and Billy Davis Jr., Johnny Taylor, the Dramatics, and the Dells — picked up one of his favorite groups (the Skyliners) to record in his United Sound Studios. They recorded the group's "comeback" album for the RCA subsidiary, Tortoise International Records. The songs "Oh, How Happy" and "The Love Bug" were included, as was a hefty re-make of Dan Schafer's original RCA Victor single, "A Day Without You, Dear".

Janet Vogel-Rapp committed suicide in 1980; Cathy Cooper joined the group as a replacement. She and Ross left two years later to form a duo; they were replaced by Rick Morris and Donna Groom.

Morris retired in 1993. Beaumont invited David Proch to join the group and he accepted. Also performing with the group at this time was Tom Sholes, brother of Bob Sholes. The two were local to the group; they attended St George High School in the Allentown neighborhood of Pittsburgh. The group became Beaumont, Groom, Proch, and Nick Pociask.

David Proch (at age 44) the third person to sing tenor for the Skyliners, died on October 19, 1998, in a car accident. His car collided with a truck hauling asphalt on U.S. Route 30 near Ligonier, Pennsylvania. Proch's place was taken by Dick Muse, a former member of the Laurels. Rick Morris replaced Muse in 2011. Frank Czuri replaced Morris in 2013. In January 2019 Jim Gregorakis replaced Nick Pociask. Eric Bruce replaced Frank Czuri in September 2019.

Their longtime manager and producer Joe Rock, who also co-wrote "Since I Don't Have You", died on April 4, 2000, at age 63, after complications from quadruple bypass heart surgery.

Four of the original members have died:

- Janet Vogel-Rapp (born June 10, 1941, in Pittsburgh) died by suicide on February 21, 1980, aged 38
- Joe Verscharen (born August 30, 1940, in Pittsburgh) died of cancer on November 2, 2007, aged 67
- Wally Lester (born Walter Paul Lester Jr. on October 5, 1941, in Pittsburgh) died of pancreatic cancer in Southport, North Carolina on April 21, 2015, aged 73
- Jimmy Beaumont (born James Beaumont on October 21, 1940, in Pittsburgh) died in McKeesport, Pennsylvania, on October 7, 2017, aged 76.

Until his death, Jimmy Beaumont performed with the Skyliners in their line-up of Nick Pociask, Frank Czuri, and Donna Groom (whose husband, Mark Groom, has been the group's drummer/conductor for more than 25 years).

== Discography ==
=== Albums ===
- The Skyliners— Calico CLP-3000 (Mono only) (1959)
- Since I Don't Have You — Original Sound OSR-LPM 5010 (Mono)/OSR-LPS-8873 (Stereo) (1963)
- Once Upon a Time — Kama Sutra KSBS-2026 (1971)
- The Skyliners — Tortoise International BXL1-2749 (1978)

=== Singles ===
Year	Titles (A-side, B-side) Both sides from same album except where indicated	Label & number	Chart positions			Album
Year	Titles (A-side, B-side) Both sides from same album except where indicated	Label & number	US Hot 100	US Cashbox	US R&B	Album
1959	"Since I Don't Have You" b/w "One Night, One Night"	Calico 103/104	12	7	3	The Skyliners (1959)
1959	"This I Swear" b/w "Tomorrow"	Calico 106	26	31	20	The Skyliners (1959)
1959	"It Happened Today" b/w "Lonely Way"	Calico 109	59	43	—	Since I Don't Have You
1960	"How Much" b/w "Lorraine from Spain" (from Since I Don't Have You)	Calico 114	—	98	—	Non-album track
1960	"Pennies from Heaven" b/w "I'll Be Seeing You"	Calico 117	24	24	—	The Skyliners (1959)
1960	"Happy Time" b/w "Believe Me"	Calico 120	—	—	—	Non-album tracks
1961	"I'll Close My Eyes" b/w "The Door Is Still Open"	Colpix 188	—	—	—	Non-album tracks
1961	"Close Your Eyes" b/w "Our Love Will Last"	Colpix 613	—	—	—	Non-album tracks
1962	"Everyone But You" b/w "Three Coins in the Fountain"	Cameo 215	—	—	—	Non-album tracks
1962	"Comes Love" b/w "Tell Me"	Viscount 104	128	—	—	Non-album tracks
1963	"Since I Fell for You" b/w "I'd Die"	Atco 6270	—	—	—	Non-album tracks
1965	"The Loser" b/w "Everything Is Fine"	Jubilee 5506	72	88	34	Non-album tracks
1965	"Get Yourself a Baby" b/w "Who Do You Love"	Jubilee 5512	—	—	—	Non-album tracks
1966	"I Run to You" b/w "Don't Hurt Me Baby"	Jubilee 5520	—	—	—	Non-album tracks
1974	"Where Have They Gone" b/w "I Could Have Loved You So Well"	Capitol 3979	100	—	—	Non-album tracks
1976	"The Day the Clown Cried" b/w "Our Day Is Here"	Drive 6250	—	—	—	Non-album tracks
1978	"Oh How Happy" b/w "We've Got Love on Our Side"	Tortoise International 11243	—	96	—	The Skyliners (1978)
1978	"The Love Bug (Done Bit Me Again)" b/w "Smile on Me"	Tortoise International 11312	—	—	—	The Skyliners (1978)
1990	"You're My Christmas Present" b/w "Another Lonely New Year's Eve"	Classic Artists 123	—	—	—	Non-album tracks
"—" denotes releases that did not chart or were not released in that territory.

=== Jimmy Beaumont solo singles ===
- "The End of a Story" / "Baion Rhythms" — Colpix 607–1961
- "Ev'rybody's Cryin'" (Billboard No. 100) / "Camera" — May 112–1961
- "I Shoulda Listened to Mama" / "Juarez" — May 115–1962
- "I'm Gonna Try My Wings" / "Never Say Goodbye" — May 120–1962
- "Give Her My Best" / "I'll Always Be in Love with You" — May 136–1963
- "There's No Other Love" / "Please Send Me Someone to Love" — Gallant 3007–1964
- "Love Is a Dangerous Game" / "Just A Little Closer" — Gallant 3012–1964
- "I Feel Like I'm Falling in Love" (Billboard No. 123) / "Tell Me" — Bang 510–1965
- "You Got Too Much Going for You" / "I Never Loved Her Anyway" — Bang 525–1966

=== Janet Vogel solo single as Janet Deane ===
- "Another Night Alone" / "I'm Glad I Waited"—Gateway 719–1963

== Awards and recognition ==
The Skyliners were inducted into The Vocal Group Hall of Fame in 2002.

On August 11, 2019, a section of road in McKeesport PA's Renziehausen Park, Tulip Drive, was renamed Jimmy Beaumont Blvd. With Beaumont's family present, the dedication ceremony took place at the park's Lions Bandshell and was followed by a concert with the current Skyliners.

== Bibliography ==
- Joel Whitburn, The Billboard Book of Top 40 Hits. 7th edn, 2000, ISBN 978-0823082803
