= Wild Cherry (album) =

Studio album by Wild Cherry
- Released: June 1976
- Recorded: 1975–1976
- Studio: Cleveland Recording Company
- Genres: Funk rock; disco
- Length: 33:08
- Label: Epic
- Producer: Robert Parissi

Wild Cherry chronology
Wild Cherry (1976)	Electrified Funk (1977)

Professional ratings
Review scores
Source	Rating
AllMusic	4/5 stars
Christgau's Record Guide	C

Wild Cherry is the debut studio album by Wild Cherry, released in 1976. The album includes the group's only major single success, "Play That Funky Music".

== Track listing ==
Song credits and lengths taken from original LP sticker. All songs written by Rob Parissi, except where noted.

Side one
No.	Title	Writer(s)	Length
1.	"Play That Funky Music"		5:00
2.	"The Lady Wants Your Money"		4:14
3.	"99½"	Steve Cropper; Eddie Floyd; Wilson Pickett	3:00
4.	"Don't Go Near the Water"		3:15

Side two
No.	Title	Writer(s)	Length
5.	"Nowhere to Run"	Holland–Dozier–Holland	3:07
6.	"I Feel Sanctified"	The Commodores	3:45
7.	"Hold On"		4:11
8.	"Get It Up"		3:01
9.	"What in the Funk Do You See"		3:35

== Personnel ==
=== Wild Cherry ===
- Robert Parissi – guitars, lead vocals
- Bryan Bassett – guitars, backing vocals
- Allen Wentz – bass, backing vocals, synthesizers
- Ronald Beitle – drums, backing vocals, percussion

=== Additional personnel ===
- Chuck Berginc, Jack Brndiar, Joe Eckert, Rick Singer – horns (tracks 1, 3, 6)
- Becky Goldstein, Tampa Lann – backing vocals (tracks 2, 7, 8)
- Mark Avsec – synthesizer (tracks 2, 5, 8, 9), piano (track 5)
- Gerald Paluck – vibes (track 7)

=== Production ===
- Executive producer: Carl Maduri
- Arranged by Wild Cherry
- Produced by Robert Parissi for Belkin/Maduri Productions
- Recorded by Ken Hamann
- Mixed by Carl Maduri, Robert Parissi and Ken Hamann

== Charts ==
=== Weekly charts ===
Weekly chart performance for Wild Cherry
Chart (1976)	Peak position
Canada Top Albums/CDs (RPM)	5
Dutch Albums (Album Top 100)	12
Norwegian Albums (VG-lista)	17
US Billboard 200	5
US Top R&B/Hip-Hop Albums (Billboard)	1

=== Year-end charts ===
Year-end chart performance for Wild Cherry
Chart (1976)	Position
Canada Top Albums/CDs (RPM)	41

== Certifications ==
Certifications for Wild Cherry
Region	Certification	Certified units/sales
United States (RIAA)	Platinum	1,000,000^{^}
^{^} Shipments figures based on certification alone.

== See also ==
- List of number-one R&B albums of 1976 (U.S.)
