= George Kakasic =

American football player (1912–1973)

Profile
- Position: Guard

Personal information
- Born: April 24, 1912; Mingo Junction, Ohio, U.S.
- Died: January 30, 1973 (aged 60); Clark County, Washington, U.S.
- Listed height: 5 ft 10 in (1.78 m)
- Listed weight: 200 lb (91 kg)

Career information
- High school: Mingo Junction
- College: Duquesne

Career history
- Pittsburgh Pirates (1936–1939)

Career statistics
- Games played: 37
- Games started: 23
- Total TDs: 1
- Stats at Pro Football Reference

George John Kakasic (April 24, 1912 – January 30, 1973) was an American football guard who played for four seasons for the Pittsburgh Pirates of the National Football League (NFL). He played college football at Duquesne University for the Duquesne Dukes football team.

== Professional career ==
=== Pittsburgh Pirates ===
==== 1936 season ====
Kakasic played in all 12 games of the season. In week one against the Boston Redskins, He made a fumble recovery and ran it for a 26-yard return for the touchdown that led the Pirates 7–0 at the half. Kakasic kicked a 30-yard Field goal that won the game 10–0. In week 4 against the Chicago Bears 4-yard touchdown pass and kicked the extra point losing 27–9 finishing the season with one touchdown, 2 field goals made.

==== 1937 season ====
Kakasic played in only 11 games of the season. In week two against the Brooklyn Dodgers, he kicked the extra points two times, winning the game 21–0, finishing the season with 3 extra points made.

==== 1938 season ====
Kakasic played in only 4 games in his third season. He started in only two games of the season, before being replaced by backup kicker Armand Niccolai.

==== 1939 season ====
Kakasic played his final season, playing in only 10 games of the season. In week 11 against the Philadelphia Eagles, he had two of his kicks blocked, before retiring at the end of the season.
