= Steubenville Township, Jefferson County, Ohio =

Township in Ohio, US

- Township
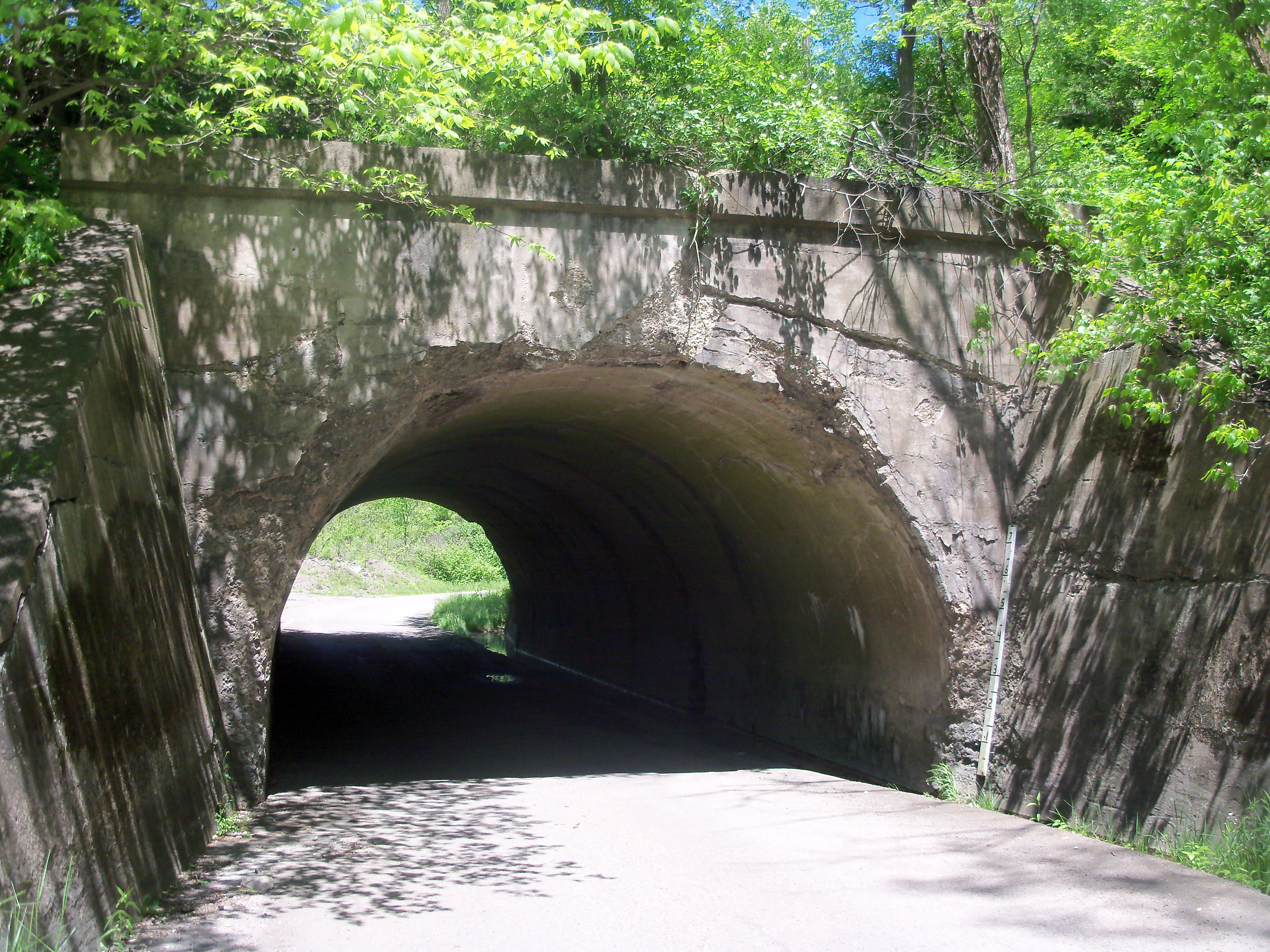
- Cool Spring Road (Steubenville Township Road 167A) passes under Wheeling and Lake Erie tracks just to the east of the Coen Tunnel

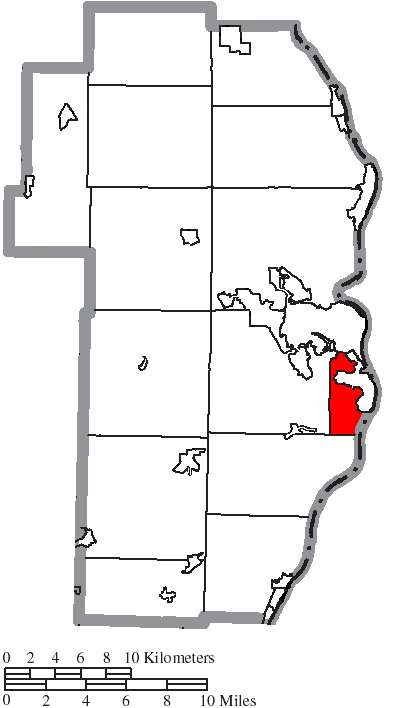
- Location of Steubenville Township in Jefferson County
- Coordinates: 40°19′16″N 80°37′4″W
- Country: United States
- State: Ohio
- County: Jefferson

Area
  - Total: 7.8 sq mi (20.2 km^{2})
  - Land: 7.8 sq mi (20.2 km^{2})
  - Water: 0 sq mi (0.0 km^{2})
- Elevation: 890 ft (270 m)

Population (2020)
  - Total: 4,117
  - Density: 528/sq mi (204/km^{2})
- Time zone: UTC-5 (Eastern (EST))
  - Summer (DST): UTC-4 (EDT)
- ZIP codes: 43952-43953
- Area code: 740
- FIPS code: 39-74615
- GNIS feature ID: 1086387

Steubenville Township is one of the fourteen townships of Jefferson County, Ohio, United States. The 2020 census found 4,117 people in the township.

== Geography ==
Located in the eastern part of the county along the Ohio River, it borders the following townships and city:

- Steubenville - north
- Wells Township - south
- Cross Creek Township - west

Brooke County, West Virginia lies across the Ohio River to the east.

Most of the northern part of the township is occupied by the city of Steubenville, the county seat of Jefferson County. Of the remainder, the village of Mingo Junction is located in the northeastern part of the township.

== Name and history ==
Steubenville Township was founded in 1803.

It is the only Steubenville Township statewide.

== Government ==
The township is governed by a three-member board of trustees, who are elected in November of odd-numbered years to a four-year term beginning on the following January 1. Two are elected in the year after the presidential election and one is elected in the year before it. There is also an elected township fiscal officer, who serves a four-year term beginning on April 1 of the year after the election, which is held in November of the year before the presidential election. Vacancies in the fiscal officership or on the board of trustees are filled by the remaining trustees.
