= Introducing the Jaggerz =

Studio album by The Jaggerz
- Released: 1969
- Genre: R&B, rock, pop
- Label: Gamble

The Jaggerz chronology
Introducing the Jaggerz (1969)	We Went to Different Schools Together (1970)

Professional ratings
Review scores
Source	Rating
Allmusic	3/5 stars

Introducing the Jaggerz is the debut studio album by the Pittsburgh rock/pop band the Jaggerz, released in 1969. The album is the first release for The Jaggerz on Gamble Records.

== Track listing ==
1. "Gotta Find My Way Back Home" (Melvin Steals, Mervin Steals)
2. "(That's Why) Baby I Love You" (Joe Rock, Bill Maybray, Thom Davies)
3. "Give a Little Love" (Harvey Fuqua, Clyde Wilson, Johnny William Bristol, Wilburt Jackson)
4. "What Now My Love" (Carl Davis, William Butler, Otis Leavill)
5. "Higher and Higher" (Gary Jackson, Raynard Miner, Carl Smith)
6. "Forever Together - Together Forever" (M. Steals, M. Steals)
7. "Let Me Be Your Man" (Kenneth Gamble, Leon Huff, Spain)
8. "Bring It Back" (J. Rock, Donnie Iris, Jimmie Ross)
9. "Here's a Heart" (Ervan Waters, William Collier, Samuel Culley)
10. "Ain't No Sun" (Bill Withers, Cornelius Grant, Norman Whitfield, Sylvia Moy)
11. "Need Your Love" (Bobby Freeman)
12. "Together" (K. Gamble, L. Huff)

== Personnel ==
- Dominic Ierace - guitar, vocals
- Jimmie Ross - bass guitar, vocals
- Benny Faiella - guitar
- Thom Davies - organ
- Billy Maybray - bass guitar
- Jim Pugliano - drums
