= Coen Tunnel (Mingo Junction) =

Railway tunnel in Ohio, U.S.

Coordinates: 40°18′51″N 80°37′09″W

The Coen Tunnel is a railway tunnel in Mingo Junction, Ohio, United States. It is part of the Wheeling and Lake Erie Railway's ex-Pittsburgh and West Virginia Railway line.
