= Teegarden & Van Winkle =

American musical duo

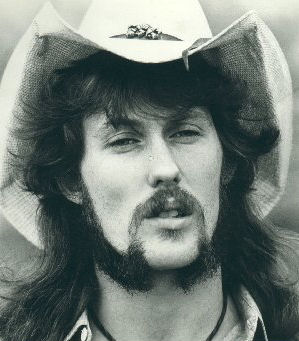
Skip (Knape) Van Winkle 1971

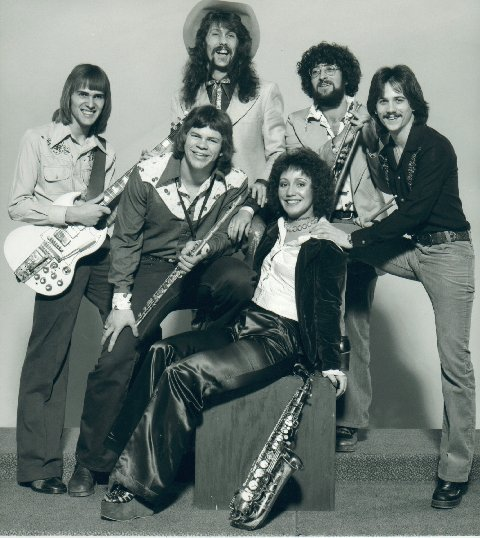
Skip Van Winkle Band 1972

Teegarden & Van Winkle were an American musical duo, composed of Skip (Knape) Van Winkle (electronic organ, organ pedal bass, vocals) and David Teegarden (drums, vocals). Formed in Tulsa, the duo took its brand of folksy rock to Detroit.

Their single "God, Love and Rock & Roll", which borrowed heavily from "Amen", peaked at #22 on the Billboard Hot 100 and #7 in Canada in 1970. Their single "Everything Is Gonna Be Alright" (aka "Shoes"), released the same year, was covered by, among others, The Temptations on their "Live At London's Talk of the Town" album. The duo occasionally worked with Bob Seger, appearing live at his concert and producing an album with Seger and guitarist Mike Bruce. Teegarden later appeared as the drummer in Bob Seger's Silver Bullet Band, recording four further albums with Seger. In 1972–1973, while Teegarden toured with Bob Seger, Knape put his own full band together consisting of horns and female vocals. Sheila "Shea" Chambers and Shaun Murphy (also known as Stoney Reese) were vocalists in Knape's band, as well as pre-RCA Victor recording artist Dan Schafer on guitar and vocals with Jim Langois on drums, Dave Heater on sax and Jack Muncie on trumpet.

In the late 1980s Los Angeles, Skip teamed up with Detroit guitarist/singer Dallas Hodge, who with his brother Catfish Hodge had the Hodge Brothers Band. Dallas and Skip had a regular weekly jam night at an L.A. Hotspot in Calabasas, Pelican's Retreat. Also in that band, Boston saxophonist David "Woody" Woodford and drummer from Houston, Steve Hunter. The jam night was highly successful, attracting a lot of heavyweight musicians and entertainers.

In the early 1990s, former Doors guitarist Robby Krieger formed a trio called The Robby Krieger Organization featuring Knape on electric organ and organ pedal bass and Dale Alexander on drums and backing vocals.

Teegarden & Van Winkle reunited for another album, Radioactive, in 1997.

In 2012, Knape was working and recording with the Stronghold Rockin Blues Quest in Southern California. He can be seen in the Strong Rhythm and Blues Quartet's video "Big Girl" featuring Chuck Strong on drums and vocals. In 2016, Van Winkle began performing every Tuesday night at Bergie's steakhouse in Santa Clarita, California.

Skip (Knape) Van Winkle died on November 27, 2018, at age 74.

== Discography ==
=== Albums ===
- Evening at Home with Teegarden & Van Winkle (Plumm, 1968)
- But Anyhow (Atco, 1969)
- Teegarden & Van Winkle (Roadies) (Westbound, 1970)
- On Our Way (with Bruce) (Westbound, 1972)
- Experimental Groundwork (Westbound, 1973)
- Radioactive (1997)

=== Singles ===
- "God, Love and Rock & Roll" / "Work Me Tomorrow" (Plumm/Westbound, 1970) (U.S. Billboard #22, Cash Box #14; Canada #7, NZ #16)
- "Everything Is Going To Be Alright" / "You Do" (Westbound, 1970) (U.S. #84) (Can. #91)
- "Passing Gas" / "Ride Away (With Me)" (Westbound, 1971)
- "Carry On (With You)" / "Ride Away (With Me)" (Westbound, 1971)
