= Daniel Joseph Schafer =

Singer, songwriter, and actor

Dan Schafer
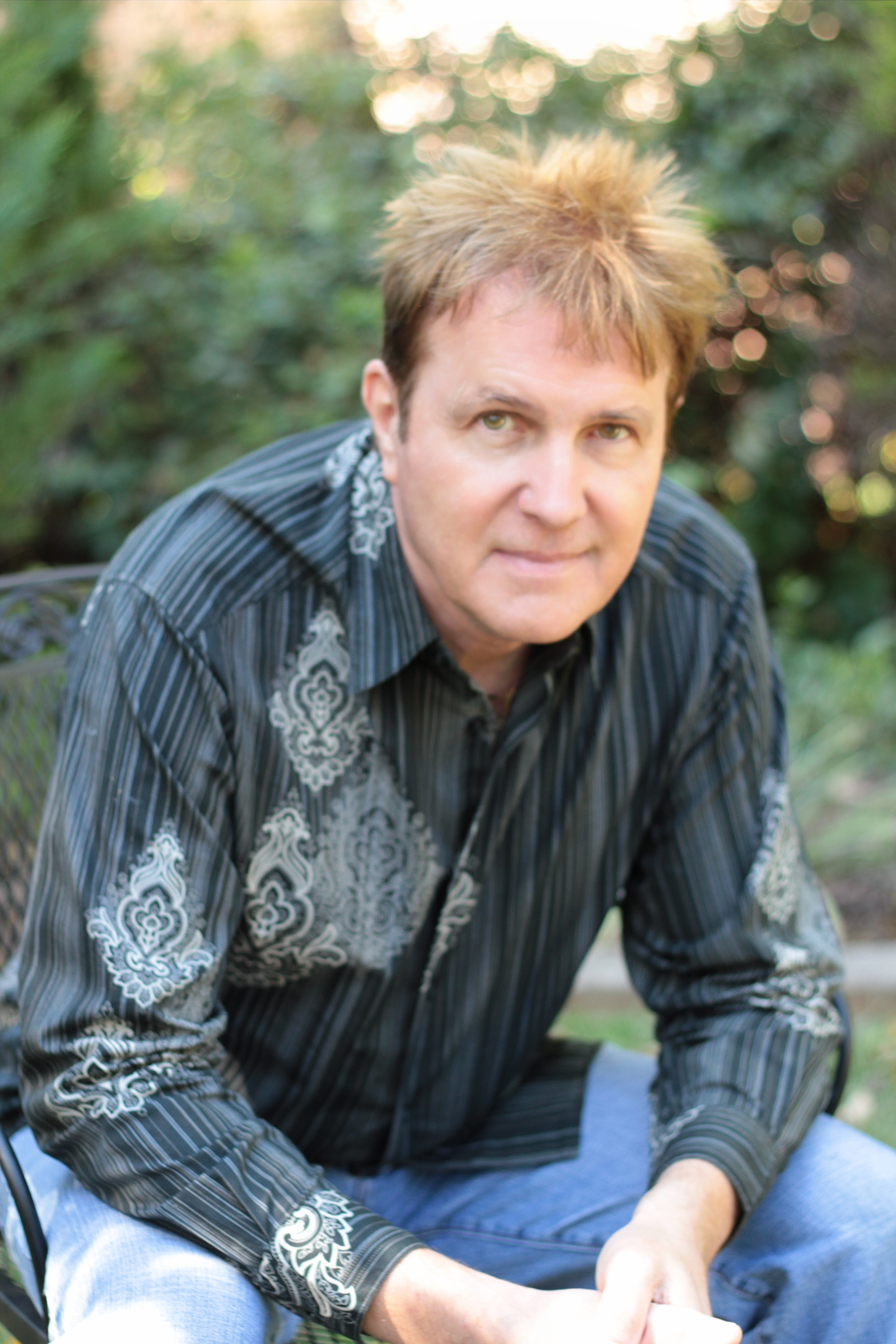
- Dan Schafer in 2011

Background information
- Born: Daniel Joseph Schafer; October 5, 1952 (age 73); Mount Pleasant, Michigan, US
- Genres: Country, Christian, pop
- Occupations: Musician, songwriter, producer/arranger, actor
- Instruments: Guitar, pedal steel guitar, bass guitar
- Years active: 1970–present
- Website: www.facebook.com/danschafermusic

Daniel Joseph Schafer (born October 5, 1952) is an American pop, country music and Christian singer, guitarist, songwriter, and actor. He was a recording artist for RCA Records and moved from playing guitar in the studio to songwriting and touring with national country music artists.

== Early life ==
Schafer was born in Mount Pleasant, Michigan and began performing as a child on local radio shows and performing at jamborees. He learned to play guitar at age of nine and, together with his parents, performed at area dance clubs, such as Palmer's Idle Hour Bar in Weidman, Michigan. While in high school, he played with two rock-and-roll bands, The Bark of Paper Mulberry and The Wild West Show. He graduated from Beal City High School in 1970, and relocated to Detroit to perform with the music group, the Grand Band, which was previously known as the 'Popcorn Blizzard'. Schafer replaced Marvin Lee Aday (professionally known as 'Meat Loaf') as lead vocalist in this band. Continuing in Detroit, Schafer's guitar skills caught the eye of local recording talents, including Moonstone and Skip Van Winkle, who'd scored records on the Billboard charts.

== Detroit – Success in the 1970s ==
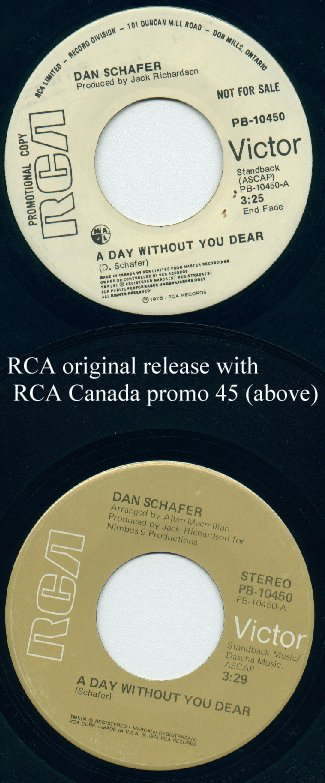
RCA Victor Canadian promo & US release single 1976

Schafer's Detroit-based manager, Gary Lazar, secured two record deals for him. In 1974, Schafer was signed to a two-year contract with RCA Records and worked with producer Jack Richardson (The Guess Who, Alice Cooper, and Poco). In 1976, Schafer recorded his own work, " A Day Without You Dear," which was released but failed to chart, despite substantial international airplay. That song was next covered by The Skyliners on their 1978 comeback album on the RCA Tortoise International album, then released in 2010 on the double CD "Once Upon a Time" /"Skyliners"

In 1978, RCA Records released "Baby, Now That I've Found You," the Schafer remake of the Foundations' hit single, working with producers Bruce Goldberg and Don Davis for the RCA Victor distributed 'Tortoise International' Label.

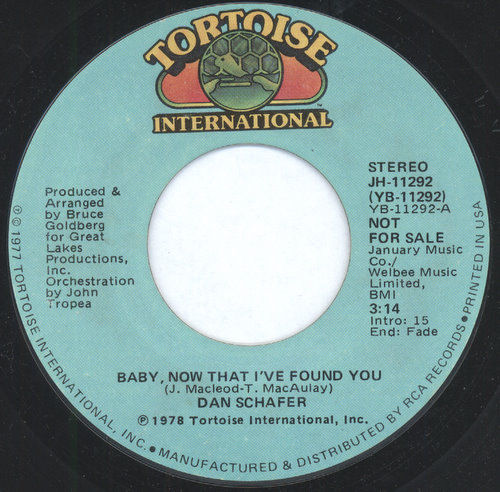
RCA/Tortoise International single 1977

Based on increased experience in working with award-winning record producers, Schafer was given the opportunity to sing and produce radio and TV commercials in the Detroit area. Some of the commercials were broadcast nationally, including Kentucky Fried Chicken, and Dow Cleansers.

Schafer next became a full-time guitarist and background singer for recording artists including Larry Santos and The Skyliners.

== Nashville – 1980s and 1990s ==
Relocating to Nashville in 1979, Schafer found professional success in the country music genre. Because of his versatility in playing lead guitar, pedal steel guitar, and bass guitar, Schafer was chosen, with the recommendation of Bobby Randall of Sawyer Brown, to tour with Leroy Van Dyke as pedal steel guitarist, which was a catapult that led to his opportunities in touring with several major recording artists including Barbara Mandrell, Lorrie Morgan, Keith Whitley, George Jones, T. Graham Brown, and Shania Twain. He was featured in Barbara Mandrell's "Do-Rite Band" on her "Moments" tour and appeared on the CBS Mandrell Family Christmas Special. Working with Shania Twain, Schafer was featured in multiple TV appearances on the Late Show with David Letterman on 10/2/95 and 2/26/96.

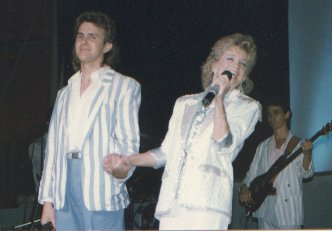
Barbara Mandrell performing duet with Dan Schafer; 'Moments' tour 1986

These tours afforded him multiple opportunities to appear on TV as the featured guitarist backing these singers on numerous award shows including "Billboard Music Awards," "The American Music Awards," "Grand Ole Opry 'Live'," and "Blockbuster Music Awards."

Schafer then left the road and performed continuously for six years on the Grand Ole Opry, playing bass for Jack Greene. He performed at Opryland theme park and was featured in Dick Clark's American Bandstand Classics Show. He made an uncredited appearance as an extra in the November 1982, CBS movie, "Country Gold," which featured Loni Anderson, Earl Holliman, and Linda Hamilton.

In Nashville, Tennessee Schafer continued his jingle recording career and sang on commercials for Pepsi, Dole Pineapple, and Honda vehicles. Eventually, he was hired to do backup music work with Leonard Wolf for the Nashville-based GAC Network (Great American Country). He is an endorsement artist for Seymour Duncan SSL-1 and California single-coil pickup sets. Thru a recommendation of Jimmy Olander from the group Diamond Rio, Schafer recorded 2 instructional DVD/VHS videos for Texas Music and Video & (1) for the Epiphone Guitar Company and a CD teaching "Bender style" guitar techniques. Thru his high profile with major artists, Dan is also endorsed by Peavey Instruments and Amplifiers, Hohner Guitars, and Steinberger basses.

A renewed commitment to Christianity took Schafer into further Bible study and his current pursuit of additional credentialing. After completing a B.A. degree in Biblical Studies and obtaining a Master's of Theology degree from the Christian Bible College and Seminary in Independence, Missouri, Schafer's music focus has also included Contemporary Christian music.

His songwriting next encompassed Inspirational and Gospel music. Together with Greg Nelson, he co-wrote "All Along the Way," which was recorded by singer Larnelle Harris and reached the No. 1 spot on the CCM Christian Inspirational charts and is included in Billboard.

== 2000 to present ==
As a music industry professional, he was asked to serve as a Judge for Music City Star Quest and in 2003 was inducted into the Michigan Country Music Hall of Fame.

Schafer continued songwriting and through the 2000s acted as staff writer and Creative Director for Faverett Music Group publishing company which boasted songs written by Chris Gantry, Josh Osborne, Randy Thomas, Becky Hobbs, Jimmy Olander and many others. Schafer produced projects for Lifeway Worship and other artists in Nashville during this period.

Schafer was featured in the Reelz TV channel drama documentary of the life of Shania Twain which first aired March 18, 2018 titled "Shania Twain: the Price of Fame".

2018-19 found Schafer playing bass guitar with Randy Owen and Alabama (band) on selected dates, as well as performing solo at the Nashville BNA Airport for the "Arts in the Airport" program stages and Puckett's BNA and other venues in the airport. That continues as of this writing.

On Sunday, March 3rd, 2024 at 10:30AM Central time, Clarksdale, MS’s own WROX_(AM) radio station added “Ministry, Music & Me” with Dan Schafer to its every Sunday morning roster. Featuring music veteran Dan Schafer sharing Scripture, Bible commentary and music he has been involved with directly or has had an influence on his musical or Spirit-filled journey. It can be listened to on 95.5 FM, 1450AM or streamed with the ‘WROX’ app and online at wroxradio.com. “Ministry, Music & Me” with Dan Schafer was then added to NBRNonline Sunday morning roster, one month later airing every Sunday at 9AM Central time.

October 2024, Schafer was featured in (2) PBS/WNPT TV episodes of "Aging Matters" which focused on the lives of 'maturing' lifetime musicians in the Nashville, TN area.

== Awards ==
Schafer's song, "All Along the Way," co-written by Greg Nelson received distinction as a No. 1 radio hit by the artist, Larnelle Harris, and remained there for five weeks in mid-August–September 1998, eventually, finding a home at the No. 6 spot in the Top 20 Inspirational songs of 1998. In 2003, Schafer was inducted into the Michigan Country Music Hall of Fame.

In 2018, Schafer received multiple Airplay Express Awards for numerous songs reaching Gold and Platinum status in January, February & October 2017.

== Discography ==
=== Singles ===
- 1968 Detroit/"Sound" label w/ The Bark of Paper Mulberry
1. "Get Yourself Together" (Valvano)
2. "Wait" (Schafer)
- 1976 RCA Victor
1. "A Day Without You, Dear" (Schafer)
2. "You Mean the World to Me" (Schafer)
- 1978 RCA/Tortoise International
1. "Baby, Now That I've Found You"
2. "New Year's Eve" (Goldberg)
- 2010 "She Ain't Breathin' Anymore" w/Paul Harper

=== Albums ===
- 1976 "Don't let the music stop' Casablanca Larry Santos – Contributed pedal steel
- 1977 Dan Schafer 'Live' (8 track and cassette only)
- 1978 "the Skyliners", RCA/Tortoise International – Contributed 12-string guitar and background vocals to the Schafer composition ‘A Day without you, Dear’.
- 1988 "Genesis" OH Dee (cassette only)
- 1993 "Lighthearted" OH DEE (cassette only)
- 1994 "Uncaged" the Animal Band

Contributed guitars, pedal steel guitar and background vocals

- 1996 "The Spirit of Christmas" Ryman w/Ross Moore
- 1997 "Genesis/For Every Season" OH DEE
- 1998 "First Love" Brentwood Larnelle Harris

Contributed co-write "All along the Way"

- 1998 "At Your Request"
- 1999 "Christmas Across America" Faverett/Bridge

Contributed vocals to 17 selections on four-CD set

- 2000 Christian Radio Hits: Faith, Madacy Larnelle Harris

Contributed co-write "All along the Way"

- 2003 "Bring him on" KMA
- 2004 "Writes co-writes & 'Faverett' Tunes" Faverett
- 2006 "Remember Why" Starburst-Mack
- 2007 "Not My Will" KMA
- 2008 "the Low Down" KMA
- 2009 "Sittin' In" KMA "Just a spark" KMA
- 2010 Life's Highway, KMA
- 2012 perhaps..the Very Best of Dan Schafer, OH DEE
- 2013 More…Now & Then, OH DEE
- 2013 Downtime, Advantage Music EMTs – Contributed co-write and lead vocal to "Whispers"
- 2016 Country that Pops KMA performing 17 co-write tracks
