= And the Band Played On... (album) =

Studio album by The Jaggerz
- Released: 1998
- Genre: Rock, pop

The Jaggerz chronology
Come Again (1975)	And the Band Played On... (1998)	Re-Rapped by Request (2001)

Professional ratings
Review scores
Source	Rating
Allmusic	4.5/5 stars

And the Band Played On... is the fourth album by Pittsburgh pop/rock band the Jaggerz, released in 1998. It was their first album since their regrouping nine years earlier. It contains new recordings of songs from the group's three original studio albums.

== Track listing ==
1. "Together" – 3:34
2. "Move Across the River" – 3:16
3. "Feels Good" – 4:44
4. "Let Me Be Your Man" – 4:10
5. "Don't Waste Your Time" – 3:24
6. "Stand in for Love/Please Baby Please" – 7:02
7. "Love Music" – 4:35
8. "I'll Never Forget You" – 3:37
9. "Kiss and Say Goodbye" – 4:36
10. "Gotta Find My Way Back Home" – 3:47

== Personnel ==
- Jimmie Ross - lead/background vocals, bass
- Benny Faiella - guitar, background vocals
- Jim Pugliano - drums, background vocals
- Dennis AcAbee - guitar
- Hermie Granati - keyboards, string and horn synthesizers, lead/background vocals, orchestrations
- Jamie Peck - sweet saxes
- David Granati - guitar ("Feels Good" and "Love Music")

This is the first Jaggerz album not to feature Donnie Iris, who, after a stint with Wild Cherry, began a successful solo career.
