= Frank Czuri =

American musician

Frank Czuri (born September 8, 1948) is an American vocalist (tenor), entertainer, songwriter and recording artist who has been performing professionally since the age of 14. He works in all genres, and is best known as the lead singer for two popular Pittsburgh rock groups, The Silencers and Diamond Reo. Since 2013 he has been performing with legendary doo-wop group Jimmy Beaumont & The Skyliners. He also fronts a reunited lineup of the pioneering Pittsburgh rock/R&B band The Igniters, with whom he began his recording career. Czuri has performed on many LPs, CDs, and singles released worldwide.

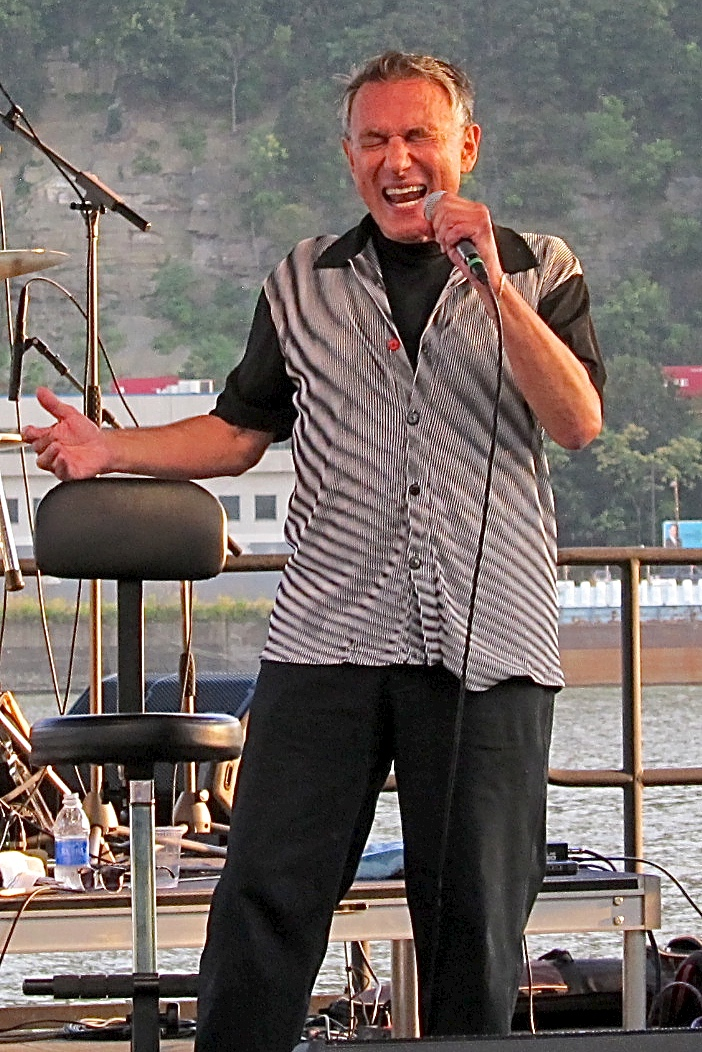
Frank Czuri performing at an outdoor concert with The Igniters, 2014

== Early years: The Igniters and Friends ==
Frank Czuri was raised in the Pittsburgh, PA, suburb of Penn Hills. He was inspired to become a performer after seeing a live all-star show featuring R&B/soul greats like Frankie Lymon, Little Anthony, Bo Diddley, and Clyde McPhatter. At the age of 14 his childhood friend Bob McKeag (a.k.a. Bubs McKeg) invited him to join his popular band The Igniters as lead singer. Within a few years, Atlantic Records took notice and signed 18-year-old Frank and his bandmates to the label. As Jimmy Mack and the Music Factory, they recorded a Top 40 single, Baby, I Love You, b/w The Hunter Gets Captured by the Game - both featuring Frank on lead vocals. It's rumored that the band was the second rock act signed by the blues/R&B label—right behind The Young Rascals. Frank and his Igniters bandmates also released the Atlantic single Gonna Try b/w Goodbye Mama under the name Friends.

== The Jaggerz and Diamond Reo ==
In 1970 Frank began a four-year stint as vocalist and keyboard player with The Jaggerz, the Pittsburgh band that had scored a Top Ten hit with The Rapper in 1969.

In 1974 he moved on to front the hard rock band Diamond Reo, whose members included guitarist Bubs McKeg, guitarist Warren King, bassist Norman Nardini, and drummer Rob Johns. Working with producer/manager Dave Shaffer and producer Tom Cossie, the band signed a contract with the Atlantic subsidiary Big Tree Records, and released a Top 40 hit cover of Marvin Gaye's Ain't That Peculiar in December 1974. They went on to release four more singles and three LPs through 1978. A British rock magazine once called Diamond Reo "the best heavy metal LP to escape from the U.S. in years." Frank's gigs with the band took him to venues far and wide - from arenas with acts like Kiss and Aerosmith, to the "upstairs room" of New York's infamous Warhol hangout, Max's Kansas City. On February 15, 1975, he appeared with Diamond Reo performing "Ain't That Peculiar" and "Movin' On" on Dick Clark's American Bandstand, season 18, episode 19. In a January 1, 1975, article in the Pittsburgh Post-Gazette, music writer Mike Kalina named Frank the region's best rock singer and Diamond Reo the best local rock band of 1974.

== The Silencers ==
In 1979, Frank started producing demo tapes of original music for Tom Cossie's Precision Records, a subsidiary of CBS Records. Soon, he was talking with Warren King about forming a new band to be called The Silencers, and together they recruited Dennis Takos on keyboards, Mike Pella on bass, and Ron "Byrd" Foster on drums. Before they had played their first gig, Cossie had managed to land them a two-album record deal with Precision, based solely on the band's demo tape. Soon The Silencers would become the hottest rock band in the Pittsburgh region with their raucous covers and original material that combined rock, New Wave, R&B, soul, and reggae. Their debut LP, Rock'n'Roll Enforcers was produced by Bob Clearmountain and yielded two singles. A video of the Silencers' medley "Peter Gunn Theme/Remote Control/Illegal" aired on MTV on the day the network premiered - August 1, 1981 - and won several awards. Billboard Magazine said of Rock'n'Roll Enforcers: "The Silencers are armed with a hard hitting debut. Fronted by the aggressive vocals of Frank Czuri...the Silencers show an amazing command of rock history…This is slashing rock which goes for the jugular."

The band's second album, Romanic, produced two singles. (See discography below.)

== Pure Gold ==
In 1985, Frank embarked on a different musical path when he joined the popular Pittsburgh R&B/doo-wop ensemble Pure Gold. During his 25 years with the group, he appeared on the PBS American Music Series performing such classics as Sh-Boom and Long Tall Girl, and backed artists like Jerry Butler, Gene Chandler, Mel Carter, Barbara Mason, Barbara Lewis, Percy Sledge, Sam Moore, among others.

== The Igniters reunion ==
In 2003, Bob McKeag decided to stage an Igniters reunion and invited Frank to join the lineup. That year they performed the first of four sold-out reunion shows that drew a total of 3,000 loyal fans from all over the U.S. Reinvigorated, they reunited on a permanent basis in 2010, and have been playing at festivals, clubs and casinos all over the tri-state region. They disbanded in 2020.

== Current Work ==
Since 2013 Frank performed and toured with Jimmy Beaumont and the Skyliners, the group that recorded the huge 1958 hit Since I Don't Have You. The ensemble was recently awarded a 2016 Pittsburgh Rock' Roll Legends Award in the Legacy area. After Jimmy’s passing in Oct 2017, Frank left. While working with Skyliners, he joined the well-established, beach music, doowop and Soul group, William Dell and WeeJams in 2016. One of five lead singers, his work includes Lonely Drifter, which receives Sirius Beach airplay.

== Personal life ==
In 2010, Frank was awarded the Penn Hills Arts, Music, and Entertainment (PHAME) award in recognition of his lifelong work.

In 2014, he retired from a 20-year career in the field of alternative education.

== Band History ==
- Medallions
- Von'Ls
- Carvells
- The Igniters
- Jimmy Mack & The Music Factory
- Friends
- Hollywood
- Jaggerz
- Diamond Reo
- Silencers
- Pure Gold
- Igniters (reunited)
- Laurels
- Jimmy Beaumont & The Skyliners
- Dancing in the Street
- WeeJams

== Discography ==
=== LP and CD releases ===
Title	Group	Label	Year
Come Again	Jaggerz	Wooden Nickel	1975
Diamond Reo	Diamond Reo	Big Tree Records	1975
Dirty Diamonds	Diamond Reo	Kama Sutra Records	1976
Ruff Cuts	Diamond Reo	Mad Dog	1978
Rock and Roll Enforcers	Silencers	Precision/CBS	1980
Romanic	Silencers	Precision/CBS	1982
Collage	Pure Gold	Green Dolphin	1998
A Capella Christmas	Pure Gold	Collectibles	2001
The A Capella Album	Pure Gold	Collectibles	2004
Forever	Pure Gold	Collectibles	2005
24 Carat Dreams	Pure Gold	Green Dolphin	2007
Merry Christmas	Pure Gold	Green Dolphin	2007
Igniters Reunion	The Igniters		2003
Just One More Time	DT and Some Shakers	DNT Records	2011

=== Singles ===
Title	Group	Label	Billboard Top 100 placing
Baby I Love You / The Hunter Gets Captured by the Game	Jimmy Mack and the Music Factory	Atlantic	
Gonna Try / So Long Mama	Friends	Atlantic	
Let's Talk About Love / I'll Never Forget You	Jaggerz	Kama Sutra	
Ain't That Sad/ Let's talk About Love	Jaggerz	Kama Sutra	
The Streaker, parts 1 and 2	Jaggerz	Jaggerz Records	
I Can't Make It Without You / A Certain Girl	Jaggerz	Jaggerz Records	
Don't It Make You Wanna Dance / 2 + 2	Jaggerz	Wooden Nickel/RCA	
Ain't that Peculiar / From Here to Infinity	Diamond Reo	Big Tree Records	44
Rock and Roll Til I Die / I Ain't Buyin'	Diamond Reo	Big Tree Records	
Work Hard Labour / Sittin' On Top of the Blues	Diamond Reo	Big Tree Records	
Lover Boy / Boys Will Be Boys	Diamond Reo	Buddah Records	
Mad Dog	Diamond Reo	Buddah Records	
Shiver and Shake / Illegal	The Silencers	Precision/CBS	89
Modern Love / Remote Control	The Silencers	Precision/CBS	
Sidewalk Romeo / One of Those Girls	The Silencers	Precision/CBS	
Romanic / Cry Tough	The Silencers	Precision/CBS	
Please Chase My Christmas Blues/I'm Your Santa Claus Baby	Pure Gold	Green Dolphin	
