= The Rapper =

1970 hit single for The Jaggerz

Single by The Jaggerz

from the album We Went to Different Schools Together
- B-side: "Born Poor"
- Released: December 1969
- Genre: Rock, pop
- Length: 2:41
- Label: Kama Sutra KA 502
- Songwriter: Dominic Ierace
- Producer: Sixuvus Productions

The Jaggerz singles chronology
"Need Your Love" (1970)	"The Rapper" (1969)	"I Call My Baby Candy" (1970)

45 RPM colored vinyl
- Limited edition release

"The Rapper" is a song by The Jaggerz, written by band member Donnie Iris. Released as a single, it reached No. 2 on the Billboard Pop Singles chart, behind Simon & Garfunkel's smash "Bridge Over Troubled Water" on 20 March 1970, it reached No. 1 on the Record World Singles chart. It was certified Gold by the RIAA in 1970 (see 1970 in music) for selling over a million copies.

== Background ==
The song is addressed to a girl, or girls in general; it describes the method of a man who seduces women with untruths ("rapping"). The singer says, "You know what he's after"; he concludes by saying there comes a point at which the man has his target where he wants her, and the girl has to "face reality". The record ends with a small burst of applause heard in the studio.

The "rapper" of the title and "rappin'" in the lyrics have only some coincidental resemblance to the vocal style of rapping.

== Charts ==
=== Weekly charts ===
Chart (1970)	Peak position
Australia (Kent Music Report)	32
Canada Top Singles (RPM)	3
US Billboard Hot 100	2
US Cash Box Top 100	2
US Record World Singles	1

=== Year-end charts ===
Chart (1970)	Rank
Canada	48
US Billboard Hot 100	45
US Cash Box Top 100	34

== Certifications ==
Region	Certification	Certified units/sales
United States (RIAA)	Gold	1,000,000^{^}
^{^} Shipments figures based on certification alone.

== Covers ==
"The Rapper" has been covered by two Jaggerz members. Since beginning his solo career, Donnie Iris has covered the song numerous times in concert. Additionally, live recordings of the song have appeared on his compilation albums.

Also, "The Rapper" was covered by Jimmie Ross during the time period when The Jaggerz weren't together. Additionally, the single was covered by Wolfman Jack. Canadian hard rock trio Santers recorded the song for their 1981 debut album Shot Down In Flames.

== Album appearances ==
- We Went to Different Schools Together, 1970 (The Jaggerz)
- Live! At Nick's Fat City, 1998 (Donnie Iris)
- 20th Century Masters: The Millennium Collection: The Best of Donnie Iris, 2001 (Donnie Iris)
- Re-Rapped by Request, 2001 (The Jaggerz)
- Ah! Live!, 2009 (Donnie Iris)
- Full Circle, 2010 (Jimmie Ross)

== See also ==
- List of 1970s one-hit wonders in the United States
