= I Love My Music =

Studio album by Wild Cherry
- Released: 1978
- Genre: Funk
- Label: Epic
- Producer: Carl Maduri, Robert Parissi

Wild Cherry chronology
Electrified Funk (1977)	I Love My Music (1978)	Only the Wild Survive (1979)

I Love My Music is the third studio album by Wild Cherry, released in 1978. It includes "Don't Stop, Get Off", a single with no lyrics outside the title itself, sung in a strident voice, backed by horns playing a funky riff. Also featured on the album is "1 2 3 Kind of Love", which, while never released as a single, did receive radio airplay.

The album entered Billboard's Top 200 chart in early February 1978, then rose to its highest position at number 84 during the week of April 8.

== Critical reception ==
Professional ratings
Review scores
Source	Rating
AllMusic	3/5 stars

The Bay State Banner wrote that Wild Cherry are "the first white bar band in this country (AWB are Scottish) to so completely opt for slick and tasty party funk instead of the usual Chicago blues... Wild Cherry plays lots of gently funky, mid-tempo soul-man songs." The Globe and Mail determined that "they cop all the good licks Sly Stone and James Brown sweated over, drain a little of the raw creativity out of them, and turn them into lovable pop."

== Track listing ==
All tracks composed by Rob Parissi; except where indicated

1. "I Love My Music"
2. "Lana"
3. "It's the Same Old Song" (Holland-Dozier-Holland)
4. "Try One More Time"
5. "Don't Stop, Get Off"
6. "1 2 3 Kind of Love"
7. "No Way Out Love Affair"
8. "If You Want My Love" (W. Stoddart)
9. "Fools Fall in Love"
10. "This Old Heart of Mine (Is Weak for You)" (Holland-Dozier-Holland-Smoy)
