= Re-Rapped by Request =

Studio album by The Jaggerz
- Released: 2001
- Recorded: 2001
- Genre: Rock, pop

The Jaggerz chronology
And the Band Played On... (1998)	Re-Rapped by Request (2001)

Re-Rapped by Request is the fifth album by Pittsburgh pop/rock band the Jaggerz, released in 2001. It contains their most requested songs.

== Track listing ==
1. "Dancin' in the Streets/Some Kind of Wonderful" (live)
2. "Never Found Me a Girl"
3. "It's Gonna Take a Miracle/I'm on the Outside Looking In"
4. "The Whole Town's Laughing at Me"
5. "(Let's Get Loose) Pass the Juice"
6. "Shakin' the Shack"
7. "(I Got Everything I Need) Almost"
8. "The Love I Never Had"
9. "It's Gonna Take a Miracle/I'm on the Outside Lokking In" (long version)
10. "Outside Help"
11. "Whose That Knockin'"
12. "The Rapper" (live)
