= Mingo Junction, Ohio =

- Village
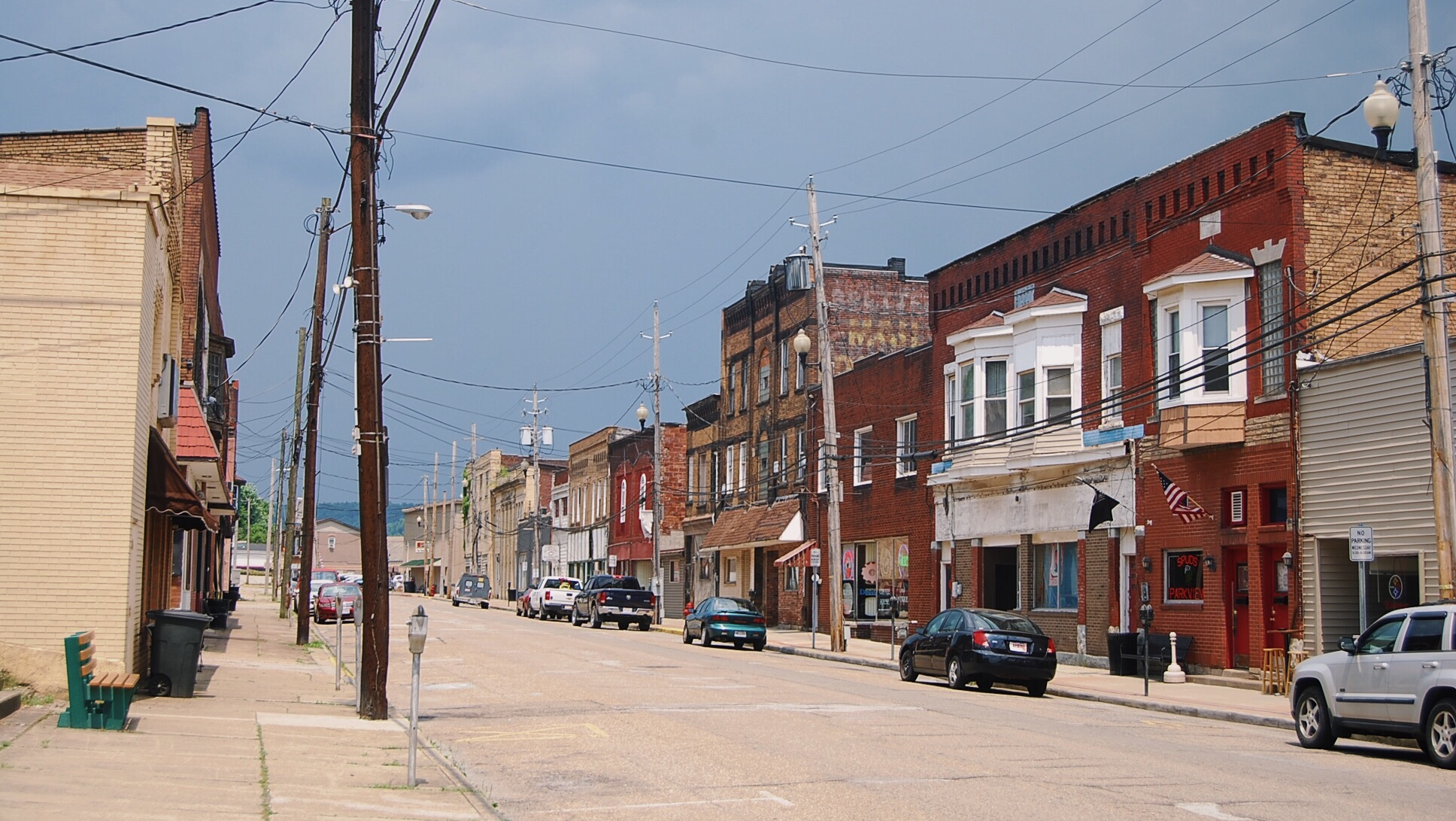
- Downtown Mingo Junction

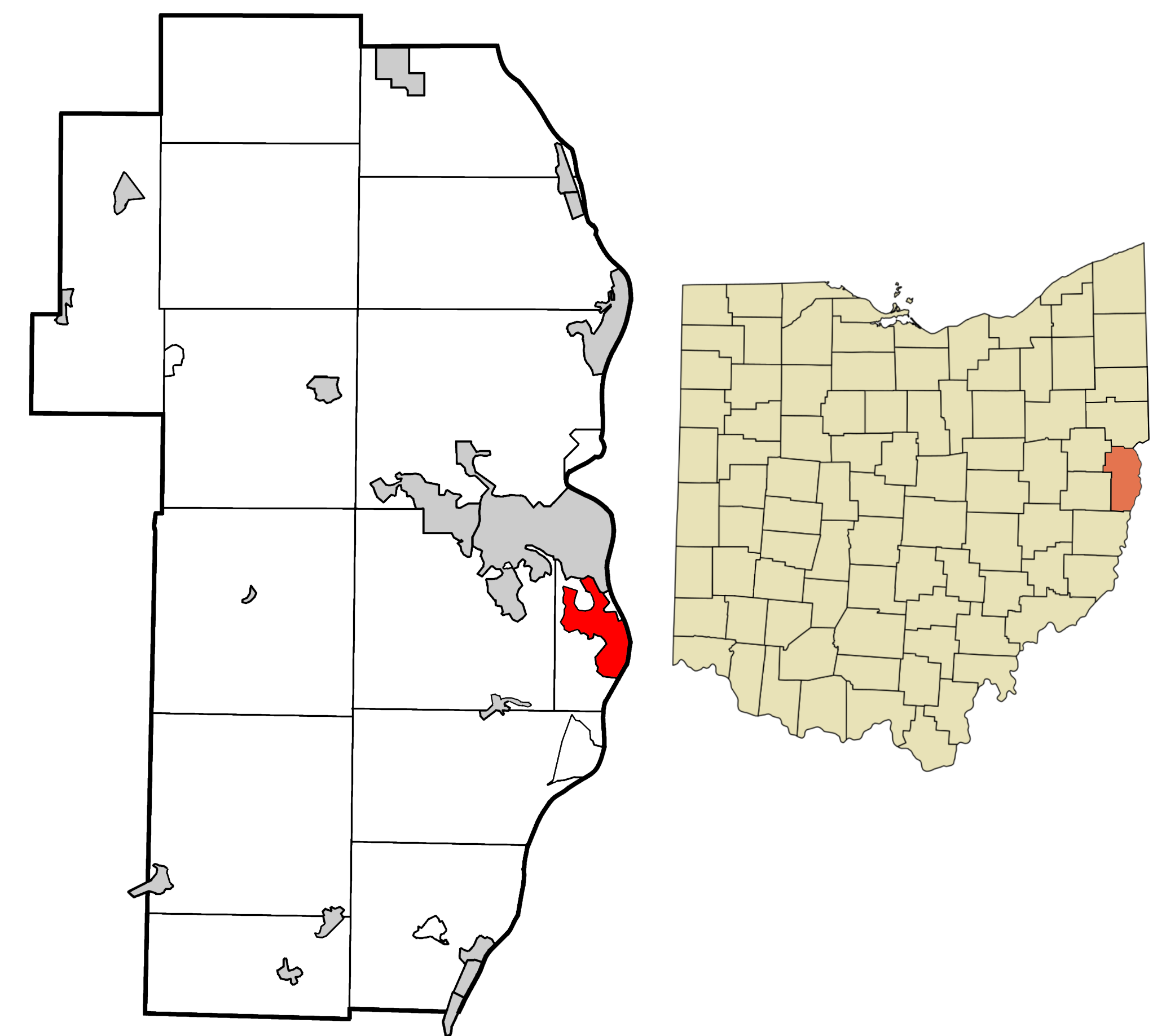
- Location of Mingo Junction in Jefferson County, Ohio

- Location within Ohio Location within the United States
- Coordinates: 40°19′17″N 80°36′33″W
- Country: United States
- State: Ohio
- County: Jefferson
- Township: Steubenville
- Founded: 1869

Government
  - Type: Mayor–council

Area
  - Total: 2.86 sq mi (7.41 km^{2})
  - Land: 2.69 sq mi (6.97 km^{2})
  - Water: 0.17 sq mi (0.44 km^{2})
- Elevation: 994 ft (303 m)

Population (2020)
  - Total: 3,347
  - Density: 1,244.3/sq mi (480.42/km^{2})
- Time zone: UTC-5 (Eastern (EST))
  - Summer (DST): UTC-4 (EDT)
- ZIP code: 43938
- Area code: 740
- FIPS code: 39-50904
- GNIS feature ID: 2399374
- Website: www.mingojct.us

Mingo Junction is a village in Jefferson County, Ohio, United States, along the Ohio River. The population was 3,347 at the 2020 census. It is part of the Weirton–Steubenville metropolitan area.

== History ==
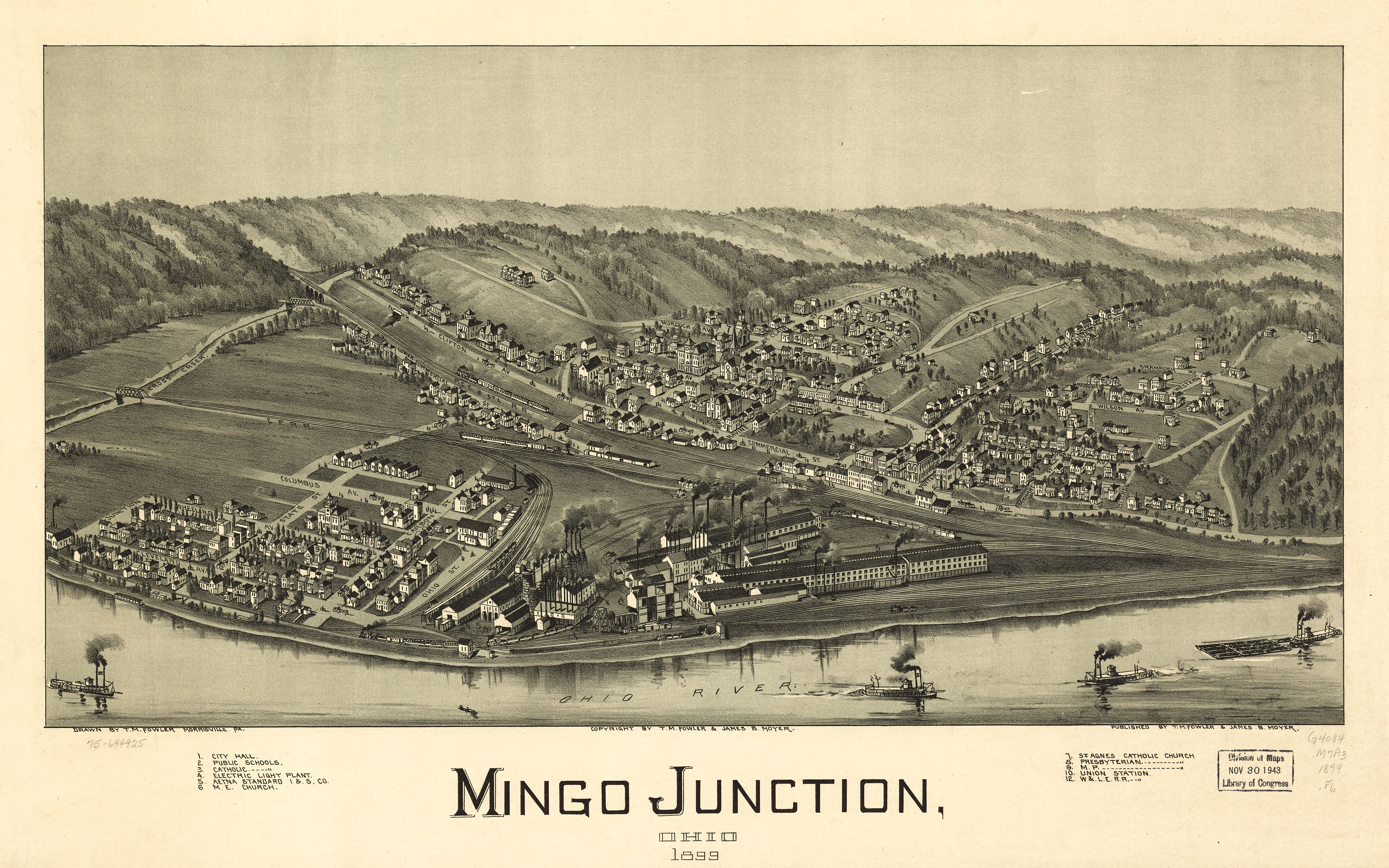
An 1899 bird’s-eye view of Mingo Junction

The Mingo “Indian” Tribe once had a settlement at the location of the present-day village, which is the source of its name. Originally known as Mingo Bottom or Mingo Town, it was the starting point for the ill-fated Crawford expedition against Native Americans from the Delaware Tribe in 1782, during the American Revolutionary War.

In 1770, George Washington set out on an expedition to explore the Ohio River Valley. On October 22, he camped overnight in what was known then as Mingo Town, describing it as blustery and cold with about 20 cabins and 70 inhabitants of the Haudenosaunee Confederacy. Washington wrote a complete account of his observations in a diary stored in the Library of Congress.

Mingo Junction was founded circa 1869 when an iron works was started there. In 1900, its only manufacturing plant was a steel mill owned by Carnegie Steel Company.

== Geography ==
Mingo Junction is in the Eastern time zone. According to the United States Census Bureau, the village has a total area of 2.86 square miles (7.41 km^{2}), of which 2.69 square miles (6.97 km^{2}) is land and 0.17 square miles (0.44 km^{2}) is water.

=== Neighborhoods ===
Altamont, Church Hill, Hillsboro, Reservoir Hill, North Hill, Sunrise Terrace, Downtown (Commercial Ave.), and Goulds Deandale Georges Run

== Demographics ==
Historical population
| Census | Pop. | Note | %± |
|---|---|---|---|
| 1880 | 371 | | — |
| 1890 | 1,856 | | 400.3% |
| 1900 | 2,954 | | 59.2% |
| 1910 | 4,049 | | 37.1% |
| 1920 | 4,616 | | 14.0% |
| 1930 | 5,030 | | 9.0% |
| 1940 | 5,192 | | 3.2% |
| 1950 | 4,464 | | −14.0% |
| 1960 | 4,987 | | 11.7% |
| 1970 | 5,278 | | 5.8% |
| 1980 | 4,834 | | −8.4% |
| 1990 | 4,297 | | −11.1% |
| 2000 | 3,631 | | −15.5% |
| 2010 | 3,454 | | −4.9% |
| 2020 | 3,347 | | −3.1% |
U.S. Decennial Census

=== 2020 census ===
As of the 2020 census, Mingo Junction had a population of 3,347. The median age was 43.5 years. 20.3% of residents were under the age of 18 and 21.3% of residents were 65 years of age or older. For every 100 females there were 92.5 males, and for every 100 females age 18 and over there were 92.2 males age 18 and over.

100.0% of residents lived in urban areas, while 0.0% lived in rural areas.

There were 1,432 households in Mingo Junction, of which 25.1% had children under the age of 18 living in them. Of all households, 38.9% were married-couple households, 20.9% were households with a male householder and no spouse or partner present, and 31.6% were households with a female householder and no spouse or partner present. About 33.1% of all households were made up of individuals and 15.2% had someone living alone who was 65 years of age or older.

There were 1,624 housing units, of which 11.8% were vacant. The homeowner vacancy rate was 2.6% and the rental vacancy rate was 6.8%.

Racial composition as of the 2020 census
| Race | Number | Percent |
|---|---|---|
| White | 2,902 | 86.7% |
| Black or African American | 137 | 4.1% |
| American Indian and Alaska Native | 9 | 0.3% |
| Asian | 9 | 0.3% |
| Native Hawaiian and Other Pacific Islander | 2 | 0.1% |
| Some other race | 82 | 2.4% |
| Two or more races | 206 | 6.2% |
| Hispanic or Latino (of any race) | 78 | 2.3% |

=== 2010 census ===
As of the census of 2010, there were 3,454 people, 1,488 households, and 948 families living in the village. The population density was 1,284.0 inhabitants per square mile (495.8/km^{2}). There were 1,675 housing units at an average density of 622.7 per square mile (240.4/km^{2}). The racial makeup of the village was 94.5% White, 3.6% African American, 0.3% Native American, 0.1% Asian, 0.1% from other races, and 1.4% from two or more races. Hispanic or Latino of any race were 0.8% of the population.

There were 1,488 households, of which 26.7% had children under the age of 18 living with them, 44.0% were married couples living together, 14.3% had a female householder with no husband present, 5.4% had a male householder with no wife present, and 36.3% were non-families. 31.6% of all households were made up of individuals, and 16.1% had someone living alone who was 65 years of age or older. The average household size was 2.32 and the average family size was 2.89.

The median age in the village was 44.2 years. 21.1% of residents were under the age of 18; 8.6% were between the ages of 18 and 24; 21.4% were from 25 to 44; 29% were from 45 to 64; and 19.9% were 65 years of age or older. The gender makeup of the village was 47.5% male and 52.5% female.

=== 2000 census ===
As of the census of 2000, there were 3,631 people, 1,542 households, and 1,062 families living in the village. The population density was 1,430.7 inhabitants per square mile (552.4/km^{2}). There were 1,691 housing units at an average density of 666.3 per square mile (257.3/km^{2}). The racial makeup of the village was 95.35% White, 3.00% African American, 0.17% Native American, 0.03% Asian, 0.11% Pacific Islander, 0.39% from other races, and 0.96% from two or more races. Hispanic or Latino of any race were 0.77% of the population.

There were 1,542 households, out of which 25.6% had children under the age of 18 living with them, 51.8% were married couples living together, 12.9% had a female householder with no husband present, and 31.1% were non-families. 27.6% of all households were made up of individuals, and 15.0% had someone living alone who was 65 years of age or older. The average household size was 2.35 and the average family size was 2.84.

In the village, the population was spread out, with 21.1% under the age of 18, 6.5% from 18 to 24, 25.6% from 25 to 44, 26.8% from 45 to 64, and 20.0% who were 65 years of age or older. The median age was 43 years. For every 100 females, there were 87.7 males. For every 100 females age 18 and over, there were 84.8 males.

The median income for a household in the village was $30,196, and the median income for a family was $40,326. Males had a median income of $37,969 versus $20,809 for females. The per capita income for the village was $16,062. About 10.8% of families and 12.8% of the population were below the poverty line, including 19.0% of those under age 18 and 8.1% of those age 65 or over.

== Education ==
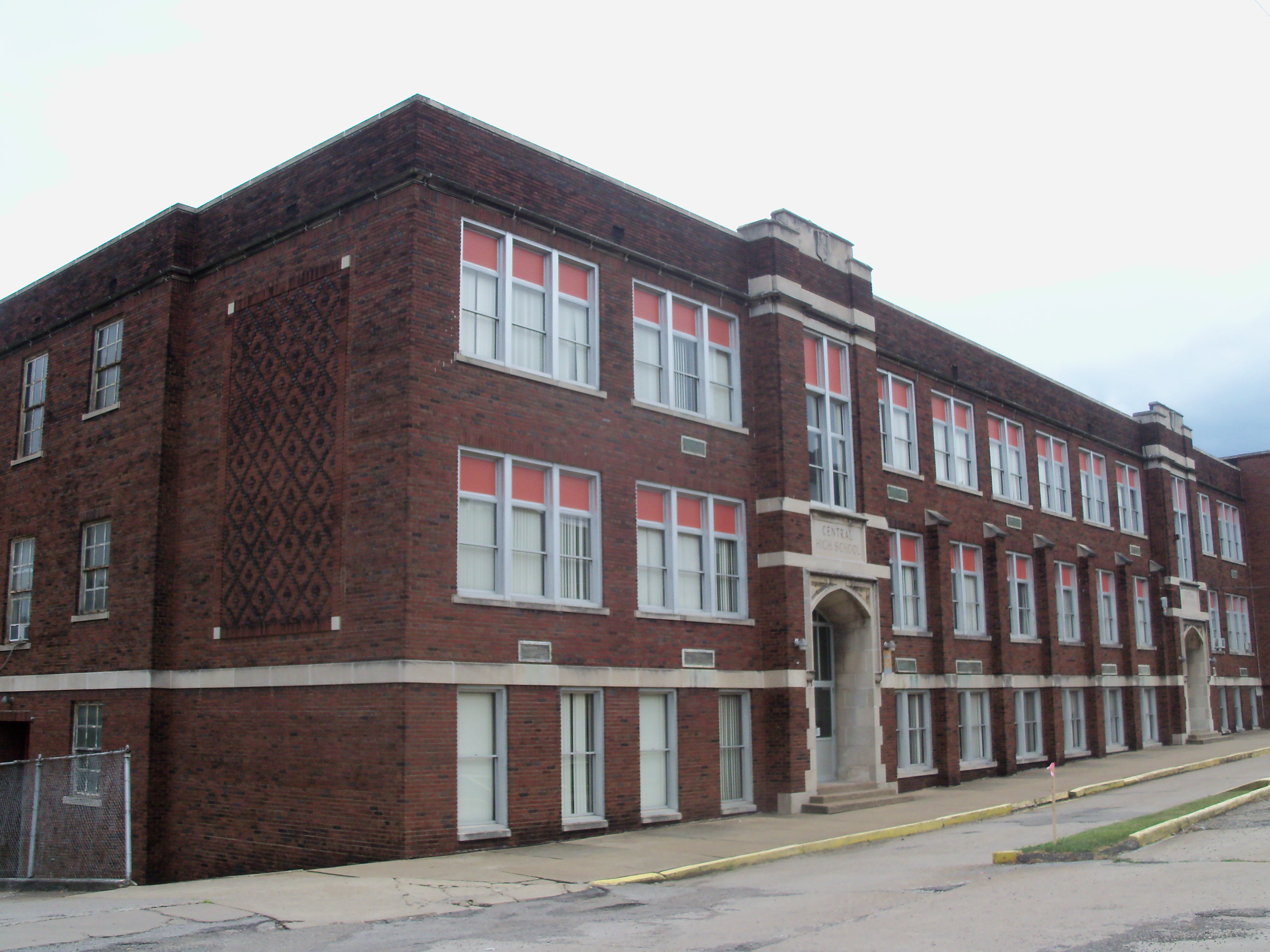
Former Mingo High School building

Public education in the village of Mingo Junction is provided by the Indian Creek Local School District, which includes two elementary schools, one middle school and Indian Creek High School. Jefferson County Christian School was also located in the area until 2012. Until 2009, the Catholic school of St. Agnes (Pre-kindergarten to eighth grade) was part of the Steubenville Parochial School District.

== Notable people ==
- Bill Batsch, major league baseball player
- Andrea DeShong, professional boxer
- Joe Fortunato, professional football player for Chicago Bears
- Woody Hayes, iconic Ohio State University football coach; coached in Mingo Junction
- Lloyd "Spud" Hughes, inventor of menthol cigarettes
- Katherine Justice, actress; Miss Ohio USA (1960)
- George Kakasic, pro football player of 1930s
- Robert Parissi, lead singer of Wild Cherry
- Harry “Light Horse” Wilson, College Football Hall of Fame (1973) and National Lacrosse Hall of Fame (1963), WWII bomber pilot

== See also ==
- List of cities and towns along the Ohio River
