= Charisse =

- Gender: Feminine

Charisse is a feminine given name. Notable people with the name include:

- Charisse, Pop Dance singer who was signed to Sutra Records in 1989
- Charisse Arrington, R&B singer who was signed to MCA Records in the 1990s
- Charisse Anne Hernandez-Alcantara, Filipino politician
- Charisse Jones, African American journalist and essayist
- Charisse Melany Moll (born 1985), Miss Suriname 2007
- Charisse Millett (born 1964), American politician
- Cyd Charisse (1921–2008), American dancer and actress
- Lady Charisse Estrada, Miss Continental Elite 2014
- Charisse Dolittle, the eldest daughter of John Dolittle, in Dr. Dolittle played by Raven-Symoné

== See also ==
- Charice Pempengco (born 1992), Filipina singer
