= Rob Parissi =

- Born: Robert Parissi; December 29, 1950 (age 75); Mingo Junction, Ohio, U.S.
- Origin: Steubenville, Ohio, U.S.
- Genres: Funk; funk rock; blue-eyed soul; disco; R&B
- Occupations: Singer; songwriter; musician
- Instruments: Vocals; guitar
- Years active: 1970–present
- Formerly of: Wild Cherry

Robert Parissi (born December 29, 1950) is an American singer, songwriter, and musician, best known as frontman for the American funk group Wild Cherry. He also wrote the group's only hit, the 1976 chart-topping "Play That Funky Music". He was raised in the steel mill town of Mingo Junction, Ohio. He graduated from Mingo High School in 1968. Parissi formed the band Wild Cherry in 1970 in Steubenville, Ohio, one mile north of Mingo Junction along the Ohio River. The band initially performed in the Ohio Valley region, Wheeling, West Virginia and the rest of the northern West Virginia panhandle, and Pittsburgh, Pennsylvania.

After Wild Cherry disbanded in 1979 without another major hit, Parissi became a producer and dedicated himself to adult contemporary music. In 1980, he toured with Bobby Caldwell. He writes and records smooth jazz and has collaborated with Steve Oliver and Will Donato.

== Discography ==
=== With Wild Cherry ===
- Wild Cherry, 1976
- Electrified Funk, 1977
- I Love My Music, 1978
- Only the Wild Survive, 1979

=== Solo ===
- Late Bloomer, 2008
- Boca Ciega Bay, 2010
- Ocean Sunset, 2011
- East Coast Vibe, 2011
- The Real Deal, 2012
