= Kama Sutra Records =

US record label

- Parent company: Sony Music Group
- Founded: 1964
- Founder: Artie Ripp; Hy Mizrahi; Phil Steinberg
- Defunct: 1993
- Distributor: Legacy Recordings
- Genre: Pop, jazz, blues, soul, rock, doo-wop
- Country of origin: United States

Kama Sutra Records was started in 1964 by Artie Ripp, Hy Mizrahi, and Phil Steinberg as Kama Sutra Productions, a production house. The Kama Sutra is an ancient Sanskrit text.

In 1965, the company was joined by Art Kass and the record label itself was started. A distribution deal with MGM Records was later signed, which lasted from 1965 until 1969. From 1969 onward, distribution was then handled by co-owned Buddah Records.

The record company ceased in mid-1976 but restarted in 1981 as Sutra Records. Under this moniker, Kass marketed and distributed Fever Records, Blue Dog Records, Baila Records, Becket Records, and signed and recorded the Cover Girls, Gene Vincent, the Fat Boys, Victor Willis, and many more before the company filed for Chapter 7 bankruptcy in 1993. The 1965–1976 Kama Sutra catalogue is now owned by Sony Music Entertainment and managed by Legacy Recordings. The 1981–1993 Sutra catalogue, with the exception of the Fat Boys, is controlled by Unidisc Music.

== Kama Sutra artists ==
- Terry Black & Laurel Ward
- Bobby Bloom
- Brewer & Shipley
- Gordon Brisker
- Charlie Daniels Band
- Dust
- Exuma
- Fat Boys
- The Fifth Dimension
- Flamin' Groovies
- Gene Vincent
- Gunhill Road
- Hackamore Brick
- The Innocence
- The Jaggerz
- The Lovin' Spoonful
- Menudo
- NRBQ
- Ocean
- The Pussycats
- Revival
- Royal Cash
- Scratch
- The Sermon
- Sha Na Na
- The Shangri-las
- Sopwith Camel
- Stories
- The Trade Winds
- Victor Willis
- Charisse

== See also ==
- Lists of record labels
