= Wild Cherry (band) =

1970s American rock band

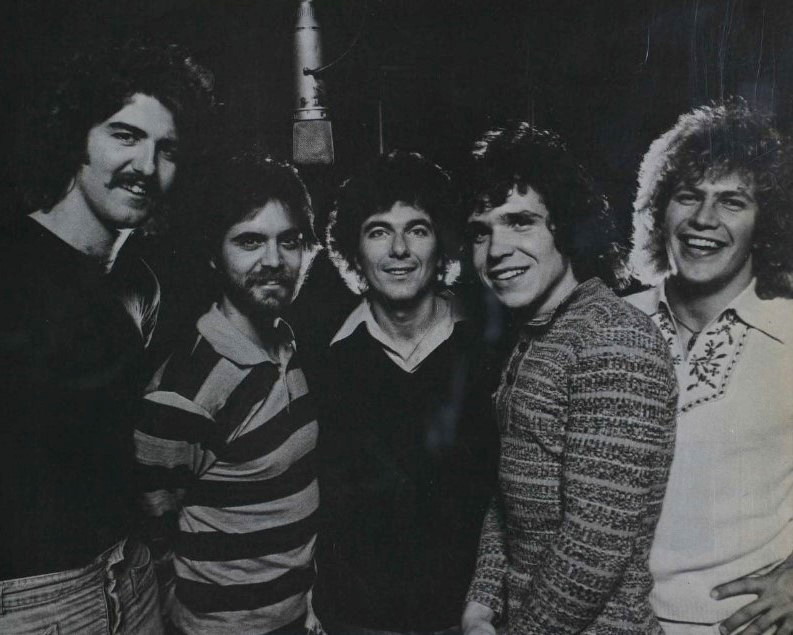
- Wild Cherry in 1977

Background information
- Origin: Mingo Junction, Ohio, U.S.
- Genres: Funk rock; blue-eyed soul; disco; R&B
- Years active: 1970–1979
- Labels: Epic; Brown Bag
- Past members: Rob Parissi; Ben Difabbio; Louie Osso; Larry Brown; Larry Mader; Coogie Stoddart; Joe Buchmelter; Bucky Lusk; Ron Beitle; Bryan Bassett; Allen Wentz; Donnie Iris; Cooke Michalchick; Ron Vallera; Mark Avsec

Wild Cherry was an American funk rock band formed in Mingo Junction, Ohio, in 1970. They released four albums. The group experienced several lineup changes in their nine-year history, with Rob Parissi being its sole consistent member.

Their self-titled debut album was released in 1976 to commercial success, peaking at number five on the Billboard 200. The record spawned the single "Play That Funky Music", which topped the Billboard Hot 100 and appeared in the top 10 of several international charts. Their following four singles and two albums Electrified Funk (1977) and I Love My Music (1978) appeared on Billboard charts, but failed to replicate the sales of their debut. After the release of their fourth and final album, Only the Wild Survive (1979), Wild Cherry disbanded.

Wild Cherry achieved brief success internationally but are deemed a one-hit wonder for "Play That Funky Music", which is one of two works by the band to be platinum-certified (the other being their debut album).

== History ==
=== Early lineups (1970–1974) ===
Rob Parissi (lead vocals and guitar) was raised in the steel-mill town of Mingo Junction, Ohio. He graduated from Mingo High School in 1968 and formed the band Wild Cherry in 1970 in Steubenville, Ohio. The band's name, 'Wild Cherry', was taken from a box of cough drops. The band played the Ohio Valley region, the Northern West Virginia panhandle, and Pittsburgh, Pennsylvania. The original lineup included Ben Difabbio (drums and vocals) and Louie Osso (guitar and vocals) from Steubenville, Larry Brown (bass and vocals) from Weirton, West Virginia, Larry Mader (keyboard and vocals) from East Springfield, Ohio, and Ron Vallera (guitar and background vocals) from Steubenville, Ohio. Over time, the band members changed; Osso, Brown, Mader, and Vallera left the band and were replaced by Parissi's cousin, Coogie Stoddart (guitar and vocals), and Joe Buchmelter (bass). Buchmelter was soon replaced by Bucky Lusk.

In the early 1970s, several records were released under their own label, including "You Can Be High (But Lay Low)" and "Something Special On Your Mind", in 1971. The music at this stage was pure rock music. Wild Cherry eventually gained a record contract with Brown Bag Records, owned and operated by Terry Knight. Brown Bag produced several demos and singles that were later distributed by United Artists, including "Get Down" (1973) and "Show Me Your Badge" (1973).

The band broke up, and Parissi left the music scene temporarily. He reformed the band in 1975.

=== Later lineups (1975–1979) ===
The new lineup consisted of Bryan Bassett (guitar/vocals), Allen Wentz (bass guitar/synthesizer/vocals), Ronald Beitle (drums), and Parissi. As the group began to develop a following in the Pittsburgh area, disco was becoming increasingly popular, and they were repeatedly asked by listeners to play more dance music. While brainstorming for new song ideas, Beitle recounted hearing a fan shout, "Are you white boys gonna play some funky music?" Parissi was inspired to write a song based on the phrase, so he began writing on a drink order pad with a pen borrowed from the bartender. After the band recorded the song, studio engineer Ken Hamann brought the band to the attention of Sweet City Records, distributed by Epic/CBS, which signed the group. Parissi had intended to record the song as the B-side to a cover version of the Commodores' "I Feel Sanctified", but the label suggested it as the A-side instead.

"Play That Funky Music" became a huge hit when released in 1976, peaking at number one on both the Billboard R&B and pop charts. Both the single and Wild Cherry's self-titled debut album went platinum. The band was named Best Pop Group of the Year by Billboard and received an American Music Award for Top R&B Single of the Year as well as a pair of Grammy nominations for Best New Vocal Group and Best R&B Performance by a Group or Duo.

"Play That Funky Music" was the only hit on the album, although "Hot to Trot" was a minor follow-up hit in some non-U.S. markets. The album featured contributions from keyboardist Mark Avsec, who soon thereafter became a permanent member of the band. None of Wild Cherry's three subsequent albums were very popular. Neither Electrified Funk (1977) (which contained the "Play That Funky Music" soundalike single "Baby Don't You Know") nor I Love My Music (1978) produced any top 40 hits, and Only the Wild Survive (1979) did not even produce a top 100 single. The band broke up in late 1979.

Coogie Stoddart returned to perform with Wild Cherry, beginning with the tour to support Electrified Funk, and recorded I Love My Music with the band. Stoddart toured with the group, in support of I Love My Music, but left before Only the Wild Survive was recorded.

=== Post-breakup (1980–present) ===
- Mark Avsec partnered with Donnie Iris (of the Jaggerz) in the early 1980s to form Donnie Iris and the Cruisers. Iris had played with Wild Cherry on their fourth and final album. Their hit singles included "Ah! Leah!" Avsec also teamed up with fellow Cruiser Kevin Valentine to record under the moniker Cellarful of Noise in 1985, releasing two albums with this project. Another of Avsec's compositions, "She Don't Know Me", originally written for the band La Flavour (who later evolved into "Fair Warning"), became one of the first hits for the then-fledgling band Bon Jovi. A lawsuit related to "Ah! Leah!" inspired Avsec to become a copyright lawyer.
- Allen Wentz moved to New York City and became a session synthesizer specialist, playing on many records and jingles. He has worked with artists ranging from Luther Vandross and Roberta Flack to Cyndi Lauper.
- Bryan Bassett became a producer and engineer at King Snake Studio in Sanford, Florida. He has played with Foghat and Molly Hatchet, and he has also served as a board governor for the Florida Chapter of NARAS.
- Parissi moved to Miami, Florida in 1979 and formed a tour band with Bobby Caldwell. In 1980, Parissi moved to New York City, met members of Billy Squier's band, and did recording sessions with them. At the same time, he also co-wrote songs with Ellie Greenwich and Jeff Kent and co-produced the album Dedication, along with Gary U.S. Bonds and Bruce Springsteen in 1980-81. The album produced the hit "This Little Girl (Is Mine)", which sold over 500,000 copies, for which Rob was awarded another gold album. As of the 2010s, Parissi resides in Florida and is writing and recording in the adult contemporary and smooth jazz genres, as in his CD "The Real Deal", an all-vocal album.

On August 11, 2013, the people of Parissi's hometown in Mingo Junction, Ohio renamed the longest street there as Rob Parissi Boulevard and declared August 11 as Rob Parissi Day. He and his wife, Ilona, established a scholarship endowment for his former consolidated high school, now named Indian Creek High School, and he returns every year to do a charity fundraiser.

- Ron Beitle (1954–2017) performed with several rock bands, including Nied's Hotel Band in Lawrenceville, Pennsylvania. He died in 2017.

== Musical style ==
Wild Cherry's musical style has been described as funk rock blue-eyed soul, disco, and R&B. The band originally formed as a hard rock band.

== Band members ==
=== Final lineup ===
- Rob Parissi – vocals, guitar (1970–1979)
- Donnie Iris – guitar, vocals (1978–1979)
- Cooke Michalchick – bass, vocals (1978–1979)
- Ronald Beitle – drums, percussion (1975–1979)
- Mark Avsec – keyboards (1975–1979)

=== Previous members ===
- Ben Difabbio – drums, vocals (1970–1975)
- Louie Osso – guitar, vocals (1970–1973)
- Larry Brown – bass, vocals (1970–1973)
- Coogie Stoddart – guitar, vocals (1973–1975, 1977–78)
- Joe Buchmelter – bass (1973)
- Bucky Lusk – bass (1973–1975)
- Allen Wentz – bass, synthesizer, vocals (1975–1978)
- Bryan Bassett – guitar (1975–1978)
- Ronald Vallera - guitar (1970)

== Discography ==
=== Studio albums ===
List of studio albums, with selected chart positions
Year	Album	US	US R&B	NLD	NOR	Certification
1976	Wild Cherry	5	1	12	17	RIAA: Platinum
1977	Electrified Funk	51	33	—	—	
1978	I Love My Music	84	54	—	—	
1979	Only the Wild Survive	—	—	—	—	
"—" denotes releases that did not chart.

=== Compilation albums ===
- Play the Funk (2000)
- Super Hits (2002)

=== Singles ===
List of singles, with selected chart positions
Year	Album	US	US R&B	CAN	BEL (FL)	GER	NLD	NZ	UK	Certifications
1970	"You Can Be High (But Lay Low) / Tomorrow Morning"	—	—	—	—	—	—	—	—	
1971	"Something Special on Your Mind / You Took the Sun Away"	—	—	—	—	—	—	—	—	
1972	"Get Down / I Wrote This Song for You"	—	—	—	—	—	—	—	—	
1973	"Get Down / Livin' & Lovin'" (reissue)	—	—	—	—	—	—	—	—	
1973	"Show Me Your Badge / Bring Back the Fire"	—	—	—	—	—	—	—	—	
1975	"Voodoo Doll / Because Your Love Is Mine"	—	—	—	—	—	—	—	—	
1976	"I Feel Sanctified"	—	—	—	—	—	—	—	—	
1976	"Play That Funky Music"	1	1	2	6	42	4	4	7	BPI: Platinum
1977	"Baby Don't You Know"	43	41	55	—	—	—	—	—	
1977	"Hot to Trot"	95	62	—	—	—	—	17	—	
1977	"Hold On (With Strings)"	61	—	78	—	—	—	—	—	
1978	"123 Kind of Love"	—	—	—	—	—	—	—	—	
1978	"I Love My Music"	69	49	70	—	—	—	—	—	
1978	"This Old Heart of Mine"	—	—	—	—	—	—	—	—	
1979	"Try a Piece of My Love"	—	—	—	—	—	—	—	—	
"—" denotes releases that did not chart or were not released in that territory.

== See also ==
- List of artists who reached number one in the United States
- List of artists who reached number one on the Billboard R&B chart
- List of blue-eyed soul artists
- List of funk rock bands
- List of 1970s one-hit wonders in the United States
