= Play That Funky Music =

1976 single by Wild Cherry

- Side A of the 1976 US single

Single by Wild Cherry

from the album Wild Cherry
- B-side: "The Lady Wants Your Money"
- Released: April 1976
- Genre: Disco; funk rock; R&B
- Length: 5:00 (album version); 3:12 (single/video version)
- Label: Epic
- Songwriter: Rob Parissi
- Producer: Rob Parissi

Wild Cherry singles chronology
"Get Down" (1973)	"Play That Funky Music" (1976)	"Baby Don't You Know" (1977)

Official audio
- "Play That Funky Music" (album version) on YouTube

"Play That Funky Music" is a song written by Rob Parissi and recorded by American funk rock band Wild Cherry. The single was the first released by the Cleveland-based Sweet City record label in April 1976 and distributed by Epic Records. The performers on the recording included lead singer Parissi, electric guitarist Bryan Bassett, bassist Allen Wentz, and drummer Ron Beitle, with session players Chuck Berginc, Jack Brandiar (trumpets), and Joe Eckert and Rick Singer (saxes) on the horn riff that runs throughout the song's verses. The single hit No. 1 on the US Billboard Hot 100 on September 18, 1976; it was also No. 1 on the Billboard Hot Soul Singles chart. The single was certified platinum by the Recording Industry Association of America for shipments of over 2 million records and eventually sold 2.5 million in the United States alone.

The song was listed at No. 93 on Billboard magazine's "All-Time Top 100 Songs" in 2018. It was also the group's only US Top 40 song.

== Composition ==
Wild Cherry was a hard rock cover band, but with the advent and popularity of the disco era, the group found it increasingly difficult to book shows. Most promoters had little interest in rock bands when dance acts were far more lucrative. Parissi attempted to persuade his bandmates to incorporate dance tunes into their sets, but they resisted as they did not want to be tagged with the stigma of being "disco".

While playing at the 2001 Club on the north side of Pittsburgh, to a predominantly black audience, a patron said to band member Beitle during a break, "Are you going to play some funky music, white boys?" Parissi grabbed a pen and order pad and wrote the song in minutes. The lyrics describe the predicament of a hard rock band adjusting to the disco era.

== Charts ==
=== Weekly charts ===
Chart (1976)	Peak position
Australia (Kent Music Report)	5
Belgium (Ultratop 50 Flanders)	6
Canada Top Singles (RPM)	2
Netherlands (Dutch Top 40)	4
Netherlands (Single Top 100)	4
New Zealand (Recorded Music NZ)	4
UK Singles (Official Charts)	7
US Billboard Hot 100	1
US Hot Soul Singles (Billboard)	1
US National Disco Action Top 30 (Billboard)	12
US Cash Box Top 100	1
US Record World Singles	1
West Germany (GfK)	42

=== Year-end charts ===
Chart (1976)	Position
Belgium (Ultratop 50 Flanders)	88
Canada Top Singles (RPM)	34
Netherlands (Dutch Top 40)	16
Netherlands (Single Top 100)	29
US Billboard Hot 100	5
US Cash Box Top 100	2

Chart (1977)	Position
Australia (Kent Music Report)	55

=== All-time charts ===
Chart (1958–2018)	Position
US Billboard Hot 100	93

== Certifications ==
Region	Certification	Certified units/sales
Canada (Music Canada)	Gold	75,000^{^}
United Kingdom (BPI)	Platinum	600,000^{‡}
United States (RIAA)	Platinum	2,500,000
United States (RIAA) Digital	Gold	500,000^{*}
^{*} Sales figures based on certification alone.^{^} Shipments figures based on certification alone.^{‡} Sales+streaming figures based on certification alone.

== Vanilla Ice version ==
"Play That Funky Music"

Single by Vanilla Ice

from the album To the Extreme
- B-side: "Ice Ice Baby" (US); "Go Ill" (UK)
- Released: November 19, 1990
- Genre: Hip hop
- Length: 4:45
- Label: SBK
- Songwriter: Rob Parissi
- Producer: Vanilla Ice

Vanilla Ice singles chronology
"Ice Ice Baby" (1990)	"Play That Funky Music" (1990)	"I Love You" (1991)

Music video
- "Play That Funky Music" on YouTube

American rapper Vanilla Ice later released a song featuring an interpretation of "Play That Funky Music". Based on this single, the independent record label Ichiban Records signed Vanilla Ice to a record deal, releasing the album Hooked in January 1989, containing "Play That Funky Music" and its B-side, "Ice Ice Baby". Songwriter Robert Parissi was not credited. Parissi was later awarded $500,000 in a copyright infringement lawsuit. "Ice Ice Baby" was also found to contain copyright infringement.

Although it did not initially catch on, its B-side, "Ice Ice Baby", gained more success when a disc jockey played that track instead of the single's A-side.

Following the success of "Ice Ice Baby", "Play That Funky Music" was reissued as its own single (with new lyrics and remixed drums), and peaked at No. 4 on the US Billboard Hot 100 and No. 10 in the UK. The song's accompanying music video received heavy rotation on MTV Europe in March 1991.

=== Charts ===
==== Weekly charts ====
Chart (1990–1991)	Peak position
Australia (ARIA)	13
Austria (Ö3 Austria Top 40)	19
Belgium (Ultratop 50 Flanders)	16
Canada Top Singles (RPM)	13
Canada Dance/Urban (RPM)	4
Denmark (IFPI)	10
Finland (Suomen virallinen lista)	3
Germany (GfK)	19
Ireland (IRMA)	4
Luxembourg (Radio Luxembourg)	9
Netherlands (Dutch Top 40)	14
Netherlands (Single Top 100)	12
New Zealand (Recorded Music NZ)	7
Switzerland (Schweizer Hitparade)	14
UK Singles (Official Charts)	10
UK Airplay (Music Week)	28
UK Dance (Music Week)	32
US Billboard Hot 100	4
US Hot Dance Music/Maxi-Singles Sales (Billboard)	42
US Hot R&B Singles (Billboard)	22
US Hot Rap Singles (Billboard)	7
US Cash Box Top 100	4

==== Year-end charts ====
Chart (1991)	Position
Canada Dance/Urban (RPM)	44
US Billboard Hot 100	57

=== Certifications ===
Region	Certification	Certified units/sales
United States (RIAA)	Gold	500,000^{^}
^{^} Shipments figures based on certification alone.

== Other cover versions ==
In 1988, the band Roxanne reached No. 63 on the Billboard Hot 100 with a cover version.

English rock band Thunder reached No. 39 in the UK singles chart in 1998 with a cover, taken from their album Giving the Game Away.

== Usage in other media ==
The song appears on the opening show Ces gars-là, a French-language Canadian show on V Télé featuring the stand-up comic Sugar Sammy and Simon-Olivier Fecteau.

In the season 8 episode of The Big Bang Theory, "The Skywalker Intrusion", Sheldon Cooper says to Leonard Hofstadter "Play that funky music, white boy" when Leonard turns on the car radio, though Sheldon is unfamiliar with the cultural reference. When Leonard plays the song for him, Sheldon analyzes the song, concluding that the lyrics present a musical example of Russell's paradox.

The song is also featured in a scene from the film Evolution (2001) featuring the characters portrayed by David Duchovny, Seann William Scott and Orlando Jones singing and dancing to the song after successfully defeating a creature.

== See also ==
- List of Billboard Hot 100 number-one singles of 1976
- List of Cash Box Top 100 number-one singles of 1976
- List of number-one R&B singles of 1976 (U.S.)
- List of 1970s one-hit wonders in the United States
