= My Wife =

My Wife may refer:

- My Wife (1918 film), an American silent film
- My Wife, English language title for the 1942 Indian film En Manaivi
- My Wife (1964 film), an Italian comedy film
- "My Wife" (song), a 1971 song by the British rock band the Who

== See also ==
- Be My Wife, a song by English musician David Bowie
- That's My Wife (disambiguation)
- My Wife and I (disambiguation)
- My Woman (disambiguation)
