= My Man (disambiguation) =

"My Man" is the English title for "Mon Homme", a French song published in 1920, popularized by Mistinguett and Fanny Brice.

My Man or my man may refer to:

- A boyfriend or husband

== Film ==
- My Man (1928 film), American comedy-drama musical
- My Man (1996 film), French drama
- My Man (2014 film), Japanese romantic drama

== Music ==
- "My Man (Barbra Streisand song)", a song sung by Barbra Streisand at the end of the 1964 film, Funny Girl
- "My Man (Understands)", a 1972 single by Tammy Wynette
- "My Man", a 1974 song by the Eagles from On the Border
- "My Man" (Luv' song), a 1977 single
- "My Man" (Yoko Ono song), a 1982 single
- "My Man" (Jade Ewen song), a 2009 single
- "My Man", a song by They Might Be Giants from their 2001 album Mink Car
- "My Man" (Tamar Braxton song), a 2017 single
- My Man (album), by Tammy Wynette

== See also ==
- My Boy (disambiguation)
- My Woman (disambiguation)
