= My Boy (disambiguation) =

"My Boy" is a 1975 single by Elvis Presley.

My Boy may also refer to:

== Music ==
=== Albums ===
- My Boy (Richard Harris album), 1971 album
- My Boy (Marlon Williams album), 2022 album

=== Songs ===
- "My Boy", a song by Neil Young from his 1985 studio album Old Ways
- "My Boy" (Buono! song), 2009
- "My Boy" (Saori@destiny song), 2009
- "My Boy" (Duffy song), 2010
- "My Boy" (Billie Eilish song), 2017
- "My Boy" (Elvie Shane song), 2020

== Films ==
- My Boy (1921 film), an American silent film directed by Victor Heerman
- My Boy (2018 film), a/k/a Mon Boy, a Canadian short film directed by Sarah Pellerin

== Other uses ==
- My Boy (manga), a Japanese manga series by Hitomi Takano
- My Boys, an American television sitcom

== See also ==
- "My Boy Lollipop", a song written in the mid-1950s by Robert Spencer
- My Boys, American television sitcom
- My Boy Jack (disambiguation)
- That's My Boy (disambiguation)
- My Man (disambiguation)
- My Girl (disambiguation)
