= Blanche Merrill =

American screenwriter

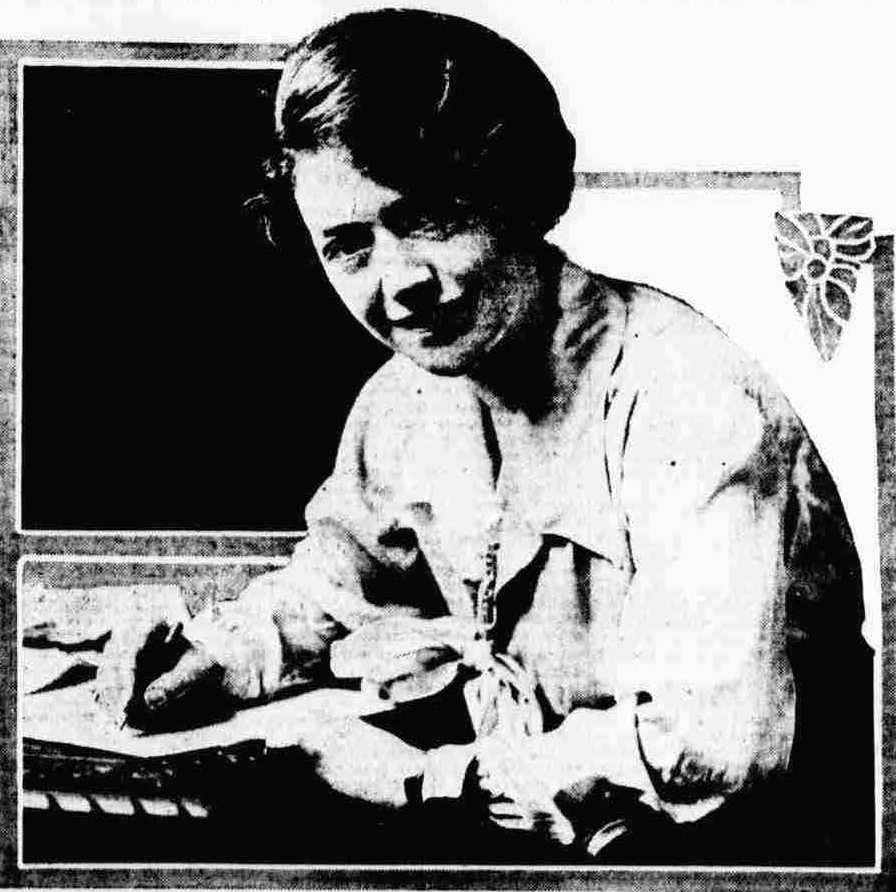
- Born: Blanche V. Dreyfoos; July 22/July 23, 1883; Philadelphia, Pennsylvania, U.S.
- Died: October 5, 1966; New York City New York, U.S.
- Occupation: songwriter

Blanche L. Merrill (born Blanche V. Dreyfoos; July 22/23, 1883 – October 5, 1966) was a songwriter specializing in tailoring her characterizations to specific performers. She is best known for the songs she wrote for Fanny Brice.

== Early life ==
Biographical information on Blanche Merrill is scarce. The only reference source that provides even a tiny bit of biographical information is partially questionable. This biography had to be constructed primarily from notices appearing in Variety and Billboard. These also must be read critically.

Blanche V. Dreyfoos was born in Philadelphia, Pennsylvania, to Sigmund A. Dreyfoos (1855 – January 12, 1899), a bookkeeper, and his wife, Lizzie (born Catherine Elizabeth Murphy; January 6, 1860 – January 17, 1921).) Although most sources are in agreement with the date of Blanche's birth (July 23), many provide conflicting evidence with regard to the year.

- The 1892 New York State census dated February 16, 1892, indicates that Blanche was 8 years old, making her born in 1883;
- In the 1920 U.S. Federal census, her age is listed as 25, making her born in 1895;
- According to the ASCAP Biographical Dictionary (based on her membership form filled when she became a member in 1936), she was born July 23, 1895. The ASCAP source was used by the Library of Congress in establishing her date of birth.
- According to the 1940 U.S. Census she was born in 1900.
- According to the Social Security Death Index and Philadelphia hospital records, she was born July 22, 1883.

Evidence leans toward 1883 as the correct year of her birth, particularly in light of her educational pursuits.

Her siblings were Nellie (born approximately 1879), Theresa (sometimes called Tessie) (born approximately 1890,), Clara (sometimes spelled Claire) (born February 15, 1881),) and W. Wallace (born approximately 1888). Though census records indicate all the children were born in Philadelphia except W. Wallace, by the time of the New York State census of 1892 the family had relocated to Queens. On January 21, 1899, Sigmund died in Brooklyn, age 43. By 1900, a year after Sigmund's death, the family was living with the family of Elizabeth's sister at 147 5th Street in College Point, Queens.

The details of her education are also problematic. In the 1917 interview, Merrill claimed to have received a Bachelor of Arts degree from Columbia University, after which she took a city examination and received her license to teach "five years" prior to the interview. However, in another profile published later that year, the unnamed author describes Merrill as having attended Barnard College. If she was born in 1895, it is improbable that she would have graduated from college and achieved teacher training by 1912, when she would have been 17. Although her college education remains mysterious, in 1906 she apparently passed her teacher training and was assigned to teach at Public School 84 in Queens. Apparently, she maintained this job until 1915, when she requested a sabbatical and apparently did not return.

== Career ==
Although Merrill claimed to have begun her theatrical career by sending an unsolicited song to Eva Tanguay, her interest in theater seems to have predated that event. In a 1917 interview, Merrill described attending theater with her mother while in high school: "I never missed a Saturday matinee". A 1906 review of a production of The Jolly Bachelors put on by St. Mary's Catholic Club in Brooklyn is probably one of the earliest mentions of Merrill (still under her birth surname) in print. A reviewer for the Brooklyn Daily Eagle reported: "There were many musical numbers. Charles Bill, William Morrison and Blanche V. Dreyfoos managed to take one step higher in the art with which they have been so generously endowed." (Blanche's sister Clara Dreyfoos played the small role of Constance.)

=== 1910-1915 ===
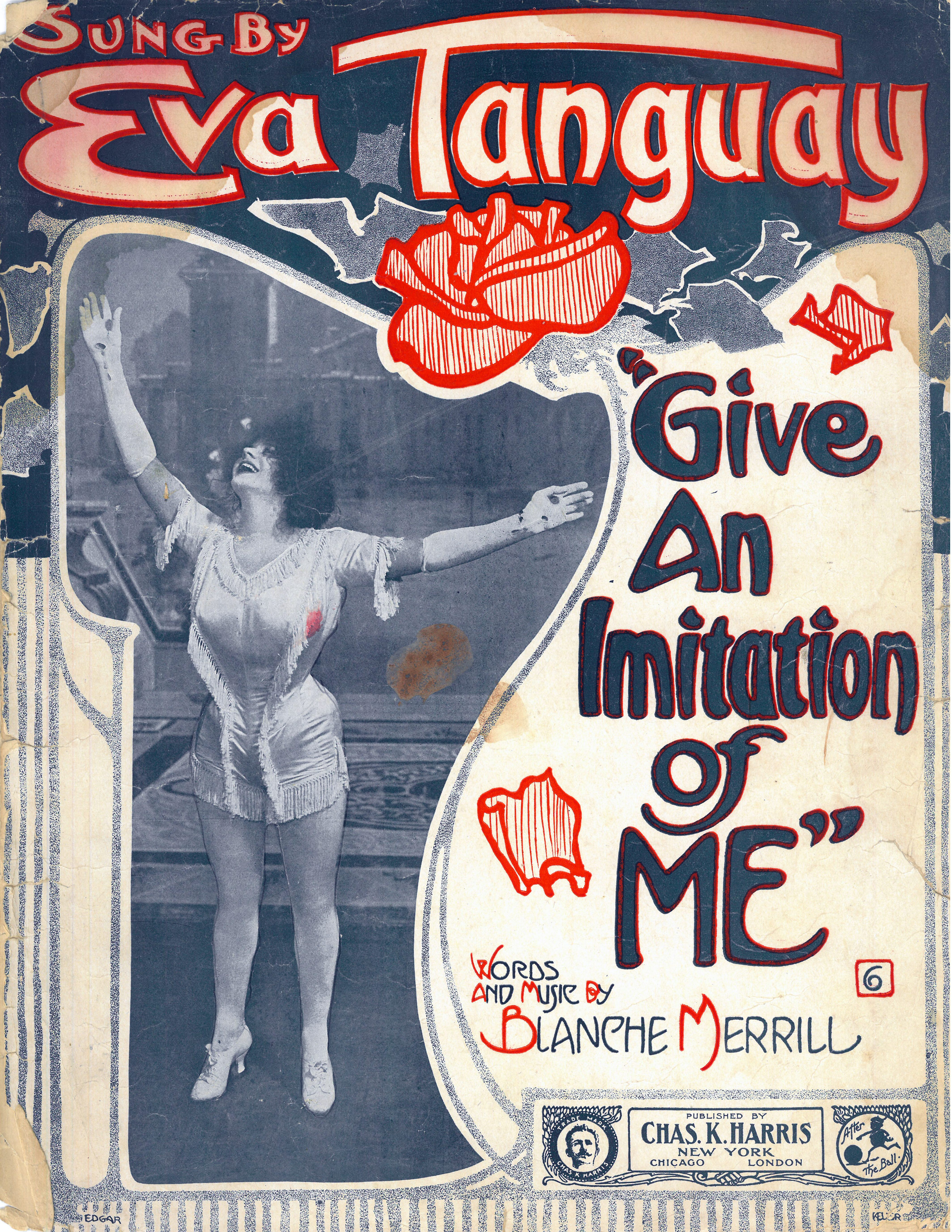
"Give an Imitation of Me" – Blanche Merrill's first published song, written for Eva Tanguay, 1910

In 1910 she saw Eva Tanguay in a vaudeville performance. She was so taken with the performance that she wrote her first song, "Give an Imitation of Me," and then filed it away. A friend convinced her to send it to Tanguay for her consideration. Tanguay liked it and accepted it, leading Merrill to write an additional four songs for Tanguay. Although she didn't accept remuneration for her first effort, that changed when songwriter and music publisher Charles K. Harris signed Merrill to a contract and published her songs. Among those songs was "Egotistical Eva", which Tanguay used to open her appearances for the 1910–11 season. With her first publication, virtually all professional mentions refer to her as Blanche Merrill.

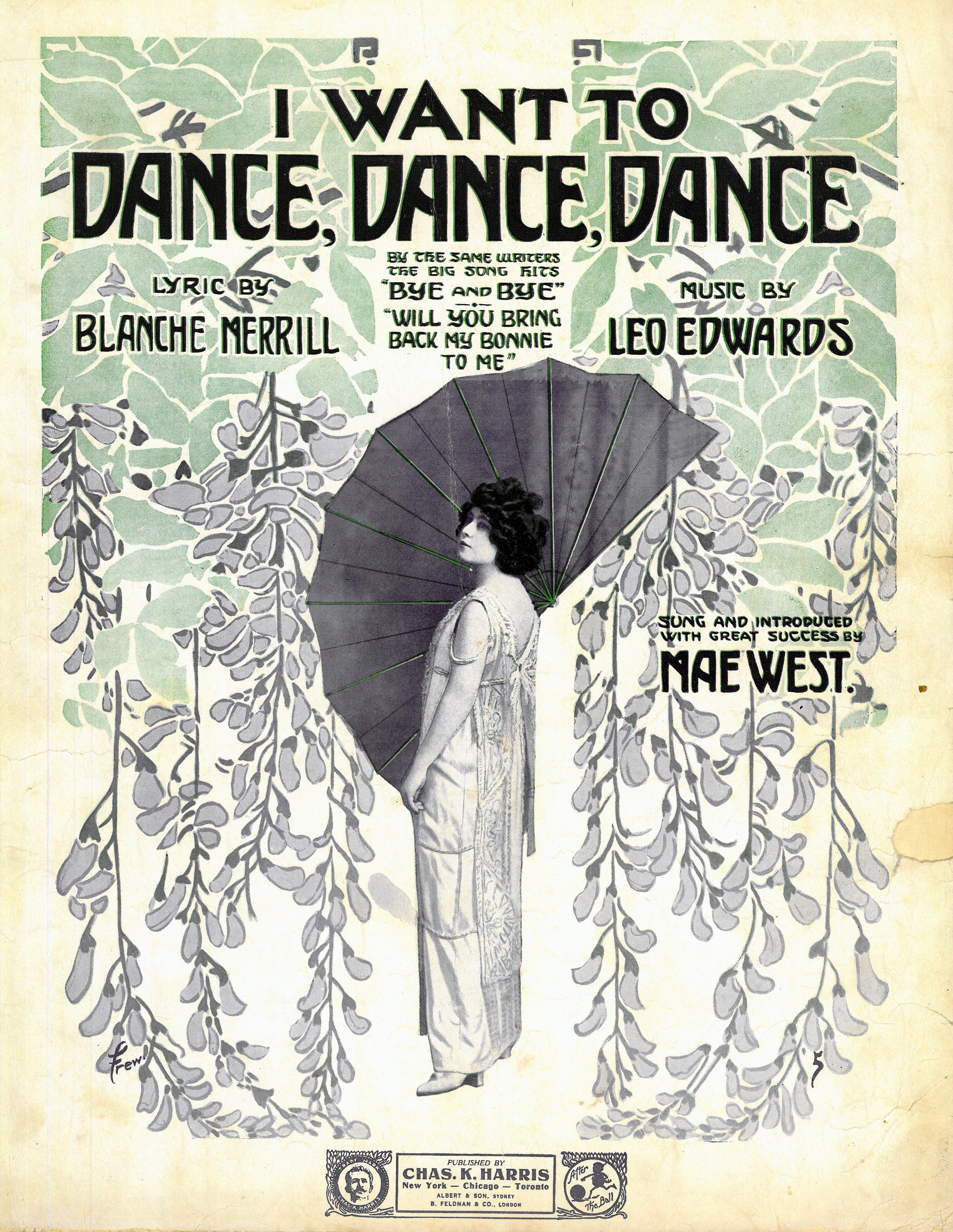
Song written for Mae West by Blanche Merrill

The Trained Nurses, a vaudeville act written by and featuring Gladys Clark and Henry Bergman, was produced by Jesse L. Lasky at the Colonial Theatre in New York City on September 16, 1912. The act's success appears to have prompted Lasky to consider a new edition for the following year (the new version does not appear to have materialized).

By 1913, Merrill was being noticed. "Several music publishing firms have been after the services of Blanche Merrill... who has gained a big reputation for her age within the past couple of years." Her work for Tanguay and Shaw as well as The Trained Nurses attracted "considerable attention from the profession to her jingling lyrics and ofttime melodies." She eventually signed with Waterson, Berlin & Snyder, Inc. This gave her the opportunity to collaborate with Irving Berlin. The single result of their collaboration was "Jake, the Yiddisher Ball Player."

The beginning of 1915 saw Eva Tanguay making her first appearance at The Palace in New York. Among the many interpolations was "Whistle and I'll Come To You" by Merrill and Leo Edwards, whose performance by Nora Bayes did not go unnoticed. Another one of Merrill's and Edward's songs, "Here's to You, My Sparkling Wine," made its way into the musical The Blue Paradise, which opened at the Casino Theatre on August 5, 1915, and then toured.

Merrill wrote the song "Broadway Sam" for comic Willie Howard, who performed it in The Passing Show of 1915.

Beginning mid-1915, there are notices of Merrill not just composing songs but also writing vaudeville acts. A Variety notice near the end of October 1915 indicates that an act, "The Musical Devil", featuring a performer ("Yvette") was written by Merrill. One of the first of Merrill's vaudeville acts to be reviewed was The Burglar, a 15-minute skit written for Maurice Burkhardt. Advertising for the act also included Merrill's name.

=== Cooperation with Fanny Brice, 1915-1925 ===
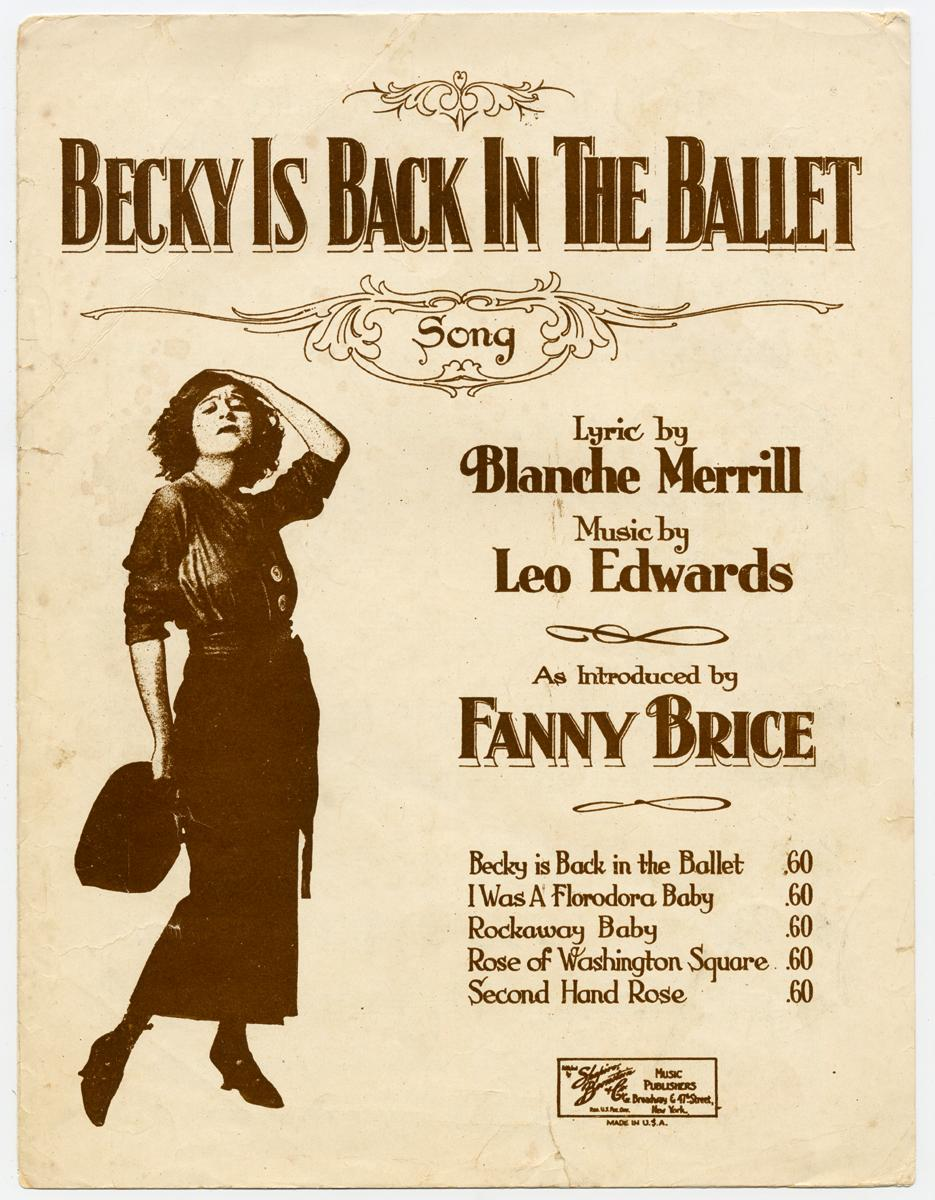
Becky is Back in the Ballet, one of Merrill's first songs written for Fanny Brice

"In 1915 Fanny Brice was already a noted comedienne." By 1915 Merrill had established a strong reputation as a songwriter who catered to the individual characteristics of specific performers, women in particular. In July 1915, Brice began to work with Merrill in what Grossman calls the "turning point in [Brice's] career and the beginning of a productive professional relationship. During their association, Merrill created some of Brice's most distinctive material and freed her from the problem that had always plagued her: finding songs that really suited her."

The first results of their collaboration resulted in Brice's act opening on September 6, 1915, at The Palace. After touring with and refining the material, Brice returned to The Palace in February 1916. The act had four songs, the last three of which had lyrics by Merrill: "If We Could Only Take Their Word," "The Yiddish Bride" (which critic and Variety founder Sime Silverman called "a gem"), and "Becky Is Back in the Ballet." The performance was favorably reviewed.

Brice's next major appearance was in the Ziegfeld Follies of 1916. Opening on June 12, 1916, among the songs Brice sang were two with lyrics by Merrill, "The Hat" and "The Dying Swan."

The Ziegfeld Follies of 1917 had Brice in only two numbers, both by Merrill.

Why Worry? was a play with music and was Brice's only attempt to play a serious role on Broadway. During its tour prior to opening on Broadway, the play closed temporarily owing to an illness of one of the performers. Initial reports were that the play lacked class. When it reopened in Atlantic City, New Jersey, for the continuation of its pre-Broadway run, it included two songs written by Merrill, one called "The Yiddish Indian." After a troubled beginning, Why Worry? opened at the Harris Theatre on Broadway on August 23, 1918.

"I'm an Indian" was one of Brice's most enduring characterizations. She recorded it in 1921, and the music was published in 1922. Brice performed it in her 1928 film My Man and Brice's performance of the song was briefly portrayed by cartoon character Betty Boop in the 1932 animated short Stopping the Show (the sequence was also used in the 1934 short Betty Boop's Rise to Fame). Finally, "I'm an Indian" is briefly viewed in a puppet rendition (by Lou Bunin) for Brice's final film appearance in the 1945 film Ziegfeld Follies.

The following year Brice had an all-Merrill program before working up an act called Around the World. The idea behind the act was that Brice would portray people from different cultures. Variety reviewer Sime described the opening number as consisting of three different styles of lyrics; unusually, the lyrics had Brice refer to Merrill. This is the song "Make 'Em Laugh". Longer than a typical song, it has Brice portraying herself travelling around New York City, going to the Belasco Theatre to the Music Box Theatre in search of the right kind of material to perform.

For her 1923 vaudeville act, Brice sang at least four songs, all with lyrics by Blanche Merrill: "Hocus Pocus," "My Bill," a ballad called "Breaking Home Ties" and a "new Spanish comedy song."

Near the end of his career, songwriter Jack Yellen recalled Tin Pan Alley and that writers of special material sometimes got the better end of a deal. He mentioned Merrill, whom he called "an expert" who could command thousands of dollars for material, with Fanny Brice being one of her steady and smart customers.

Apparently there was a break in the relationship between Brice and Merrill in 1924. Merrill published a poem in Variety in 1924 that Brice was now a "Belasco star" and that Merrill was her "use-to-be writer." Grossman hypothesized that Brice felt Merrill couldn't do anything more for her career. After her marriage to Billy Rose, a songwriter, it's possible that he disallowed collaboration between Brice and Merrill because of professional jealousy. Although they were no longer working together, in an extensive November 1925 interview, Brice had warm words for Merrill.

=== 1916-1925 ===
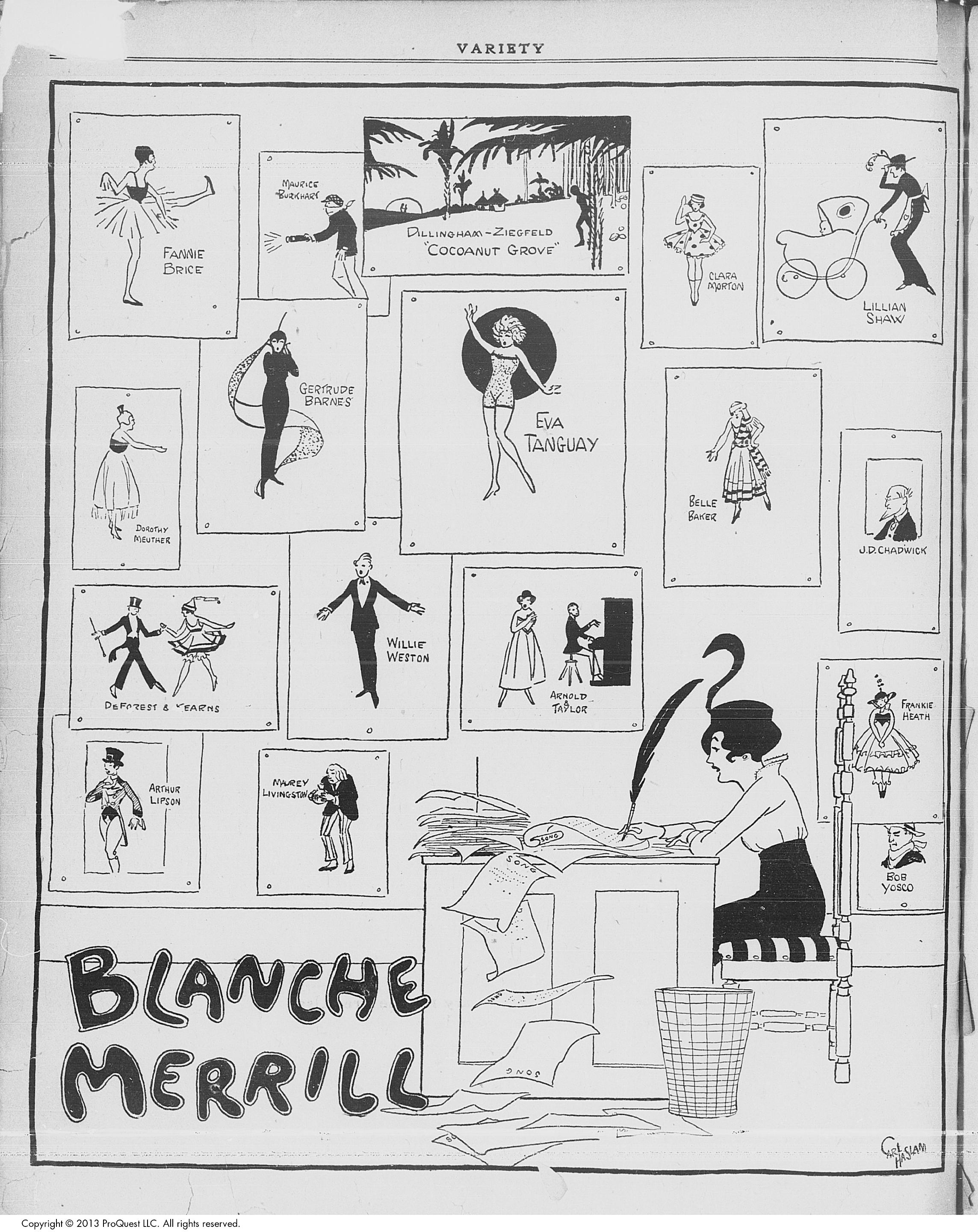
Caricature of Blanche Merrill and her various clients in 1916

Other Merrill clients and works from 1916 included Willie Weston in The Hunter, Clara Morton in The Doll Shop (originally titled The Toy Shop) in which Morton impersonated various dolls, and Gertrude Barnes in an act featuring a vampire song called "The Temptation Girl."

Merrill's talents had become so well known by the end of 1916 that Variety published a full-page caricature of Merrill writing for numerous vaudeville players who were clients: Fannie Brice, Maurice Burkhart, Clara Morton, Lillian Shaw, Dorothy Meuther, Gertrude Barnes, Eva Tanguay, Belle Baker, J.D. Chadwick, DeForest & Kearns, Willie Weston, Arnold & Taylor, Arthur Lipson, Maurey Livingston, as well as the Charles Dillingham's and Florenz Ziegfeld's "Cocoanut Grove" nightclub.

Though the caricature included the Cocoanut Grove, Variety did not explain the connection until the venue opened at the beginning of January. As a way of capitalizing on the success of Ziegfeld's Midnight Frolic, a cabaret-style evening held on the roof of the New Amsterdam Theatre, Charles Dillingham and Florenz Ziegfeld opened the Cocoanut Grove on the roof of the Century Theatre. Blanche Merrill was announced as the Cocoanut Grove's official songwriter. The first show was announced as Eat and Grow Thin; by the time it opened on January 5, 1917, it was retitled as Dance and Grow Thin. The music was by Irving Berlin and Merrill.

A brief 1917 profile of Merrill described her appearance as "businesslike" and clothed with "extreme smartness and sophistication." That year she could command $20,000 for each song.

A February 1917 advertisement in Variety announced Merrill's latest vaudeville skit, On the Scaffold. " The skit involved a blackfaced window washer and his flirtations with a housekeeper, who is a blackfaced woman inside an apartment. Rice and Werner subsequently performed it at the Hippodrome Theatre in London in 1921, and at the Palace in New York in 1922. Apparently it was successful enough that the comic duo held on to this material for years. They were still performing it in 1930 with a "post-prohibition appendage."

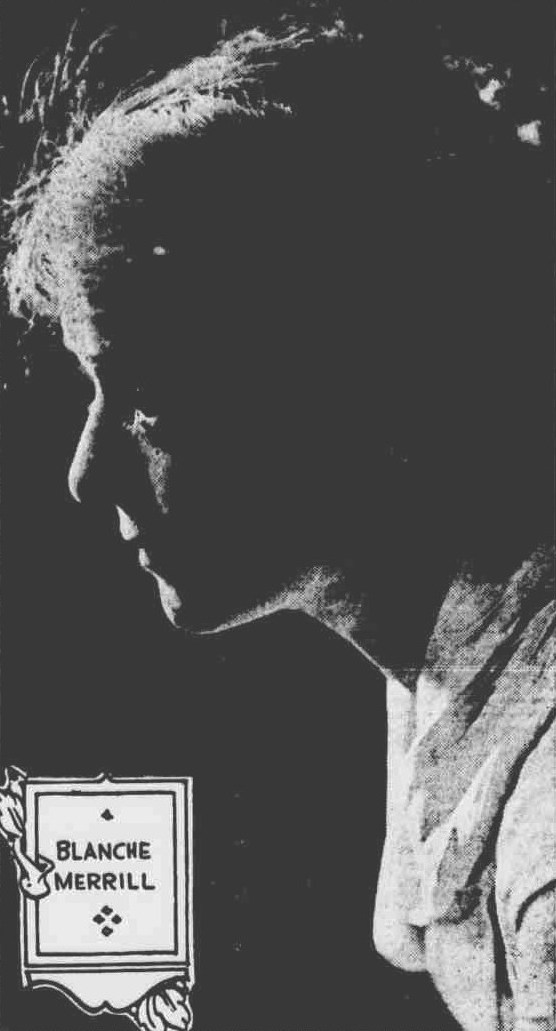
Portrait of Blanche Merrill that appeared in the New York Sun, September 9, 1917

In August 1917 Carrie Lillie appeared in the vaudeville act written by Merrill, In the Wilds.

Other performers and their acts in part or in whole written by Merrill during 1917 included Anna Ford and George Goodridge in You Can't Believe Them, Grace Cameron returning in Dolly Dimples, Mabel Hamilton (formerly of the duo Clark and Hamilton) in a solo act, and Lillian Shaw, having the penultimate spot in vaudeville program at the Colonial Theatre.

Having written a variety of vaudeville acts, in October 1917 it was announced that Merrill was putting aside specialty work in order to write a play. She predicted it would take about three month's time. The noticed indicated that several managers had already expressed interest. No play emerged; Merrill kept on contributing interpolations to various shows and revues. At the end of 1917 Merrill put out full-page advertisements offering "Holiday greetings Blanche Merrill."

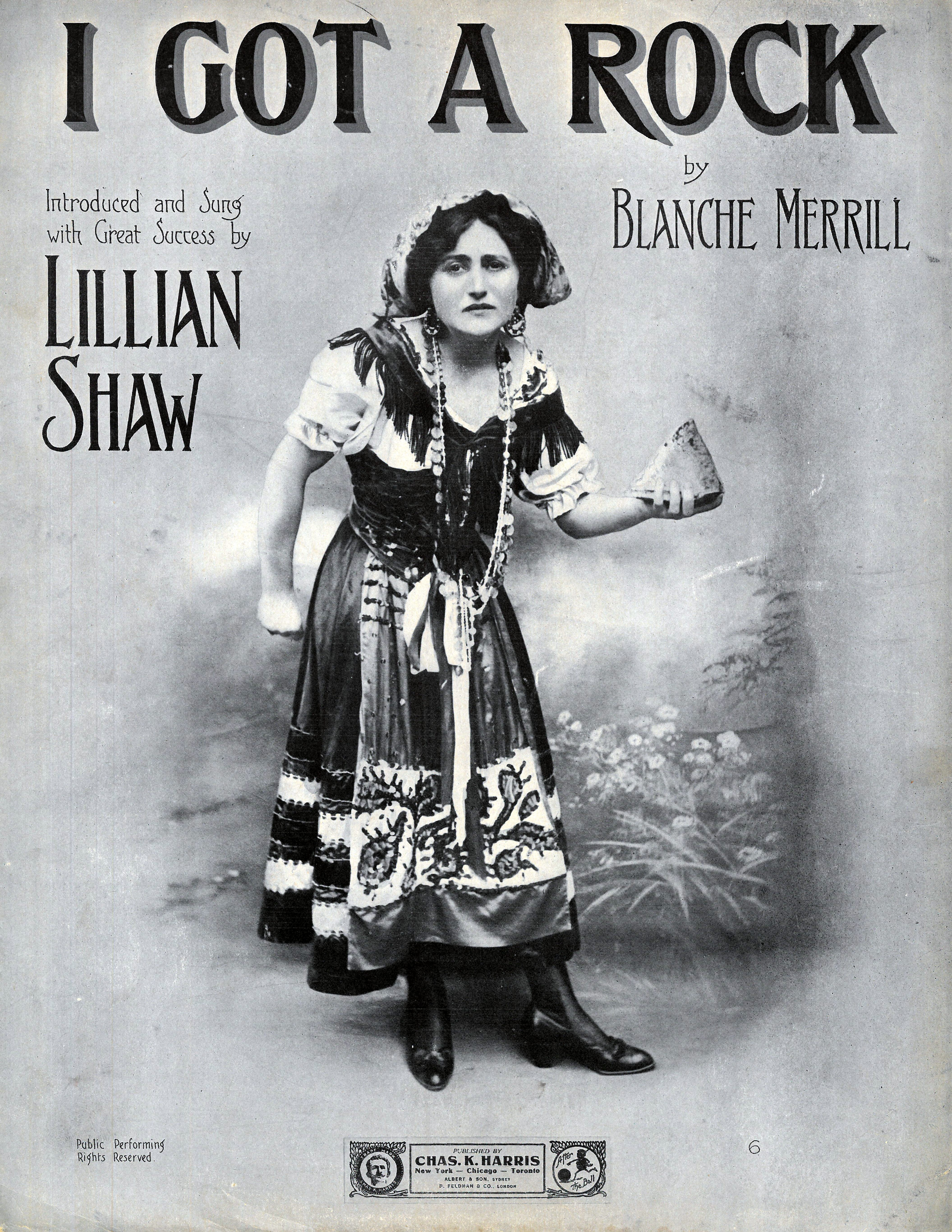
"I Got a Rock," song by Blanche Merrill written for Lillian Shaw, 1911

An anonymous 1918 article in Variety begins with mention of the song "Where Do They Get Those Guys?" being performed by Constance Farber as an interpolation in the musical Sinbad. The article continues however by talking of Merrill's desire for tighter control over her work. With the aid of her lawyer, Merrill was able to get a clause written into her contracts that restricted performance of her songs to the field to which they were conceived, whether vaudeville or musical comedy. Merrill was also able to obtain a restriction on performing rights, stipulating that a performer could not transfer performing rights to another performer. This restrictive clause was occasioned by an incident with Fanny Brice who paid Merrill $1,000 for two songs, but then gave the song "I Don't Know Whether To Do It or Not" to Lillian Shaw. Merrill was contemplating action against Brice, but either withdrew or the action was settled.

Among the most notable of performers to sing Merrill material during this time was probably Bert Williams, who sang "I Ain't Gwine Ter be no Fool There Was" by Merrill in Ziegfeld's Midnight Frolic.

The onset of World War I led Merrill to write two works whose temperament were very different from each other. One was a popular song, "Boots, Boots, Boots." Written as a parody of Rudyard Kipling's poem Boots, it was first performed by the Howard Brothers at the Winter Garden Theatre in The Passing Show of 1918. The other work was a "Drum Number" apparently written for Sophie Tucker and never published.

The first major controversy of Blanche Merrill's career occurred in 1919. As originally announced, Merrill was to write and compose all the musical numbers for the Ziegfeld Follies of 1919. Subsequent notices indicated a division of responsibility. Merrill would write the first act, Irving Berlin would write the second act, and Gene Buck would write the third act. The situation changed when Ziegfeld asked Merrill to allow composer Dave Stamper to rewrite the music for three of her songs. According to Variety, Merrill refused and withdrew from the project entirely, signing on with the Shubert Brothers to work on their upcoming show, Biff Boom Bang. But according to Barbara Wallace Grossman, Merrill was fired.

Though Biff Boom Bang did not materialize, Merrill, along with lyricist M.K. Jerome, contributed lyrics to three songs to the revue Shubert Gaities of 1919. (The songs were "Coat O' Mine," "Crazy Quilt," and "This is the Day."

A notice in a July 1919 issue of Variety stated that Merrill had signed a contract with Lee Shubert to produce a musical version of Clyde Fitch's play Girls. Although this was intended to be a vehicle for Nan Halperin, the notice warned that Halperin was known only from vaudeville and lacked theatrical experience. When the musical opened on November 3, 1919, it was called The Little Blue Devil and neither Halperin nor Merrill were associated with it. Merrill did write an act for Halperin which opened in the summer of 1920.

The lack of writing the musical version of Girls might have been the cause of the dispute between Merrill and the Shubert Brothers. Apparently that did not reduce Merrill's value. Variety reported that "Blanche Merrill Inc." increased its capital from $1,000 to $10,000.

The fall of 1920 saw the continuation of the professional relationship between Merrill and Lillian Shaw when the latter appeared at the Palace in song scenes by Merrill. A reviewer wrote "Miss Shaw was literally a howling success as far as the audience was concerned. Her second number was slightly blue in spots, but when those particular spots arrived the Palace crowd shrieked their delight. There are some spots where the talk is a little broad, so broad it may be a question how they will take it away from Broadway, but Miss Shaw is sufficient [a] showwoman to know where and where not to use it." In a dispatch dated April 7, Variety noted that Merrill was in Chicago for a week concerning "Shubert affairs." While there, she spent time at the Woods and Garrick theatres, which were home to Monte Cristo Jr. and the touring production of the Shubert Gaities of 1919. Theatrical producer Harry Frazee commissioned Merrill to produce musical versions of two of his plays, My Lady Friends and A Pair of Queens. Neither of these commissioned appeared to have seen fruition. (My Lady Friends was eventually turned into the musical No, No, Nanette.)

The lack of Merrill's activity from the end of 1920 last through the middle of 1921 was due to the illness and death of her mother, Elizabeth Dreyfoos, on January 18, 1921.

A notice in Billboard said that Merrill collaborated with John Murray Anderson on the Greenwich Village Follies of 1921, the third production in that series of revues. But when the show opened on August 31, 1921, the only credit to Merrill was a single song, "Pavlowa." By this time Merrill was earnestly trying to expand her writing skills for a musical. To producer William Harris Jr. she presented an idea for a dramatic musical revue. Harris prematurely suggested staging the work by November 1922. Subsequent notices indicated the play was intended for Fay Bainter, and that Merrill had gone to the country to concentrate on writing. By December 25, 1922, Fay Bainter opened in the play The Lady Christilinda which was produced by Harris. Merrill was not involved.

Belle Baker's appearances in the 1922–23 season prompted some attention. In October 1922 she was performing at the Palace. Her act included some songs by Merrill, including "The Bootlegger's Slumber" which one critic called "a Wop number." The song was received with enthusiasm. But with Prohibition recently put in place, the Palace's house manager warned Baker not to repeat the song. She disregarded his warnings, apparently with the approval of the audience. The conflict made the headline on page one of Variety.

Merrill also wrote an act for Lillian Lorraine.

=== Mollie Fuller ===
Merrill became involved with Mollie Fuller in 1922. Fuller had been a vaudevillian with her husband, Frederick Hallen. After Hallen's death in 1920, Fuller became blind after an unexplained ailment. In 1922, her predicament was uncovered and reported on by Variety columnist Nellie Revell who had learned of Fuller's situation after being briefly hospitalized at St. Vincent's Hospital (where Fuller had been hospitalized).

It was through Revell's column that Blanche Merrill befriended Fuller. Her performances were arranged by the B. F. Keith Circuit. Both Merrill and Keith contributed their services to the act without remuneration, and Merrill had paid production costs. By the time the Fuller's act was first presented in Paterson, New Jersey, it was called Twilight and was judged a success.

In January 1925 Variety indicated that Merrill was writing new material for Fuller. The new skit was called An Even Break and was also designed to disguise Fuller's blindness, a disability of which the audience was totally aware. In it, Fuller played a scrubwoman in a fancy dress shop. Various customers come and go, regarding the scrubwoman with condescension. When one customer wants to model a new dress, she insists the scrubwoman try it on first. As the scrubwoman is trying on the dress, she reminisces about her past days when she was an actress in the theater. The moral of the story was "All we get out of life is an even break."

Opening at the 81st Street Theatre, the act did not receive the same rapturous approval as did Twilight although reviews were generally positive. One later review indicates that the act's moral was turned into a song, "The Best That You Get When You Get It is Only an Even Break."

Fuller appeared to have finally retired from the stage after An Even Break. After several near-death scares (with Revell anxiously reporting on Merrill's devotion to Fuller), Fuller moved to California and was supported by the National Vaudeville Association until her death in 1933.

Activities for Merrill in 1923:

- Under the direction of Edwin August (engaged by Marcus Loew), the Delancey Street theater proposed using amateurs from the audience to participate with professionals in creating films which will be shown the following week. The skit is called "The Great Love" and authored by Blanche Merrill. Each film will run approximately 2,500 feet. First attempt will be during week of February 26.
- Supplied lyric for song "(Poor Little) Wall Flower" for musical "Jack and Jill" (music for the song and most of the show was composed by W. Augustus Barratt).
- Sylvia Clark appearing in the act Artistic Buffoonery by Blanche Merrill beginning April 9 at the Orpheum Theatre in Denver.
- After a return from abroad, Beth Tate will have material written by Merrill.
- Elida Morris, recently married, will continue her theatrical career. Has a new act in preparation written by Blanche Merrill.
- A notice in Variety listed those would be performing material by Merrill next season: Belle Baker, Fanny Brice (for the show Laughing Lena which never materialized), Sylvia Clark, Beth Tate, Rita Gould, Lillian Show and Hughie Clark.
- The music publisher Shapiro, Bernstein & Co. sued lyricist and publicist C.F. Zittel who, unauthorized, was making a film using the title "Yes, We Want No Bananas" which was too close to the song "Yes! We Have No Bananas." The scenario of the proposed film was to have been written by Blanche Merrill.

As a result of the thought of Henry Ford running for political office, Variety published Merrill's satirical lyrics to a song called "It's All a High Hat." (There is no other evidence of this song beyond these published lyrics.)

Evidence of Merrill's concern over unauthorized use of her material was probably relieved in part by her new contracts she put in place at the outset of the 1924–25 season. The new contracts stipulated that her material remains her property, when either performers leave a show or when the show closes. The article noted that this had become the typical procedure for most vaudevillians.

In 1924 Merrill wrote a vaudeville act, Life for Mabel McCane which first played at Poli's Capitol Theatre in Hartford, Connecticut. Other significant events for Merrill in 1924:

- Wrote a new song for Eva Tanguay, "I Don't Care Any More Than I Used To";
- Wrote an act for Alma Adair;
- Wrote The Spirit of Broadway, an act for Lida Morris;
- Wrote new songs for Cecil Cunningham;
- Wrote new material for Evelyn Nesbitt who was transitioning from cabaret back to vaudeville;
- Wrote songs for Sylvia Clark which will well received;
- Was commissioned to write material for Amazar (brought to the U.S. by John Murray Anderson play in the Greenwich Village Follies; left that show to try out vaudeville;
- New songs for Belle Baker who was embarking on a tour of the Keith circuit;

Among Merrill's notable accomplishments for 1925 was a vaudeville act she wrote for Ann Butler, called So This Is Love.

Noted accomplishments for Merrill during 1925 included:

- Merrill was engaged to write material for "Puzzles" (a revue starring Elsie Janis, eventually titled Puzzles of 1925). Her name was included in the credits for opening night. A few weeks after openings, Merrill wrote the song "When the Cat's Away" for Dorothy Appleby;
- Jimmy Hussey included in his act two new songs by Blanche Merrill, "Old Established Firm" and "We're Jumping Into Something";
- Merrill wrote a new act for Ruth Roye;
- Merrill wrote a skit for Whiting and Burt called A Good Night;
- Wrote material for Earl Carroll Vanities of 1925 (opened July 6, 1925);
- In July 1925, Variety announced the planning for a forthcoming musical version of Jack Lait's 1914 play Help Wanted. Merrill was to write the lyrics, Con Conrad would compose the music, and the musical would be staged by Earl Lindsay and Nat Philips. The notice said rehearsals were to start August 1, 1925. Apparently this project did not materialize.
- Wrote act for Ray Trainor, former announcer for the Hilton Twins;
- Wrote a monologue for Billy Abbott who would appear at Loew's American Theater;
- An end-of-the-year advertisement for Nan Traveline includes prominent mention of "Material by Blanche Merrill."

During part of this year, Merrill wrote a weekly column for Variety. Called "Weeping Singles," the column attracted attention, including some who accused Merrill of being portrayed by her.

Before Merrill's departure for Hollywood, the last new skit that appeared was written for Pauline Saxon and Ralph Coleman. An article from November 11, 1925, indicated that Merrill attended numerous parties intended to wish her well on her Hollywood journey.

=== 1925-1927: Hollywood ===
Initial news of Blanche Merrill being involved with the film industry appeared in July 1925. A report indicated that she had tried out as a scenario writer "with much success" and had written a story called "The Seven Wives of Bluebeard." This initial report was confirmed when Merrill signed a contract with Joseph M. Schenck. This contract gave her a weekly salary of $750, and would provide an additional $5,000 for each scenario or adaptation that she provided. Merrill departed for Hollywood in November 1925 for "a six month experimental visit." An exclusive contract, it would prevent her from doing vaudeville work during her time in Hollywood.

Filmed at the Cosmopolitan Studios and produced by First National, the Merrill's initial story was eventually released on January 13, 1926, as Bluebeard's Seven Wives. Merrill and Paul Schofield received credit for the story.

- A Variety article mentioned a second treatment, "French Dressing"; nothing seems to have come from this effort.)
- Merrill was to do an adaptation of the story "My Woman" to be produced by United Artists. The film was to have featured Joseph M. Schenck's wife Norma Talmadge and co-star Thomas Meighan. But Schenck decided not to have Talmadge or Meighan and instead use featured players instead of stars. The film does not appear to have been produced.
- Variety mentioned Merrill was doing another screenplay for Schenk, this time of the Edward Sheldon play Romance. (Originally filmed in 1920, Romance was filmed again in 1930 for Greta Garbo.)
- Schenck loaned Merrill to Metro-Goldwyn-Mayer where she worked on a story about vaudeville life that was to be produced by a unit under Harry Rapf.
- In March 1926, Variety reported that Merrill was adapting John B. Hymer's story The Timely Love for the screen, which was to star Norma Talmadge.
- In May, Variety reported that Merrill was working at Famous Players Studios as an adapter.

Apparently while in Hollywood, Fanny Brice contacted Merrill to work on new material. However, Merrill's contract with Schenck precluded her from writing for external clients.

The series of unrealized projects ended when Merrill became involved with the Duncan Sisters and their ill-fated film Topsy and Eva. Thinking it good material for a film, First National Pictures purchased the story and began to fashion a screen treatment. The Duncan Sisters, however, were dissatisfied with First National's proposed treatment and wouldn't sign with them. Instead, the sisters signed a contract with Joseph M. Schenck who would make the film for United Artists. After acquiring the rights from First National, Schenck engaged Merrill to write the story and continuity. Schenck also engaged Lois Weber as director. She worked on the story even more until she was replaced as director by Del Lord, who was in turn replaced by D. W. Griffith who shot the final scenes. Variety blamed the picture's poor quality on its troublesome production, but tried to be charitable: "The picture is not going to draw heavy grosses and it is not going to please all around...It will do, however, and nicely for the kiddie matinee."

The film of Topsy and Eva represented the conclusion of Blanche Merrill's involvement with the movie industry.

=== 1926-1930: West Coast vaudeville ===
Mary Kornman and Mickey Daniels, both recently retired from Hal Roach's Our Gang film series, began appearing in vaudeville in 1926. One of their first skits was written by Merrill. Called "A Day Off," Kornman and Daniels used it as they began appearing on the Orpheum Circuit, debuting at the Orpheum in Los Angeles.

In fall 1927 it was reported that Merrill was writing a comedy sketch for Priscilla Dean and Belle Bennett. Harry Weber would be sponsoring both film stars as Dean would do singing and comedy, and Bennett would do comedy. As the concept evolved, Bennett appeared to be dropped and concentration focused on Dean, who would do a monologue with songs. Dean appeared at the Loew's in Hillside, Queens on February 2, followed by an appearance in Yonkers, New York. As the act evolved, Franklyn Farnum was brought in and Merrill wrote a sketch called "A Broadway Cleopatra."

Among the successes was at least one controversy. Actress Edna Bennett sued Merrill for failure to write and deliver a vaudeville skit. The case was settled out of court.

Merrill prepared an act for Nancy Welford. Called by a critic "A miniature version of 'Sally in Our Alley'." It opened at the Orpehum Theatre in San Francisco on December 24.

=== 1929-1930: England ===
The next news that appears concerning Merrill in Variety indicated that Merrill arrived in London in late November 1929. One of Merrill's first jobs in England was writing for the team Walter Fehl and Murray Leslie as well as for Fehl's wife Dora Maugham. A result was "The Thief," a vaudeville act written for Fehl and Leslie.

An end-of-the-year review states that, despite being ill, Dora Maugham sang "a new song cycle by Blanche Merrill" at the London Palladium on December 30, 1929 where she portrayed a "bad, bad woman." On the bill along with Fehl and Murray at the Kilburn Empire Theatre in London, a reviewer wrote: "Blanche Merrill has written each of these two acts, and very effective material it is." Maugham would later appear in America and continue her professional relationship with Merrill.

Merrill created an act for the team Vine and Russell, nearly a year later they were still doing well on the material she had supplied. Merrill also wrote for Julian Rose and Ella Retford.

Having been away from New York City for five years, Merrill arrived back in the city in October 1930 and set up office at the Park Central Hotel.

=== 1930—1939 ===
Upon her return to New York City, she found an apartment at the Grenfell Apartments in Kew Gardens.

Among her first commissions after arriving back in New York City was to write new material for the singer Dora Maughan who had also come to America. Former customers also approached Merrill for material: Belle Baker, Irene Ricordo, and Lillian Shaw.

By the mid-1930s, Merrill was trying to get a foothold in radio. She was hired to provide scripts for Lulu McConnell, Nana Bryant and the Duncan Sisters. The audition show for McConnell took place in November 1934. Apparently, it was somewhat successful; Billboard identified an appearance of Lulu McConnell on Al Jolson show May 18, 1935, with a sketch by Merrill. In 1936, Variety columnist Nellie Revell reported that Merrill was "peddling radio scripts."

After unsuccessful attempts in the past, her professional friends had been lobbying ASCAP for three years to accept her as a member. Finally, in 1936, Merrill became a member of ASCAP. As Fanny Brice transitioned from stage to radio, she all but abandoned her singing career to concentrate on her Baby Snooks character. Although Brice claimed to invent the character in 1912, in a 1938 Variety article, Blanche Merrill took credit for creating the Baby Snooks character.

After a "major operation" in December 1936, Merrill convalesced in Madison, New Jersey, and wrote material for Harry Richman

In 1938, Merrill opened offices in conjunction with music publisher Irving Mills whose company was Mills Music. The association with Mills undoubtedly led to the publication in 1939 of "Fanny Brice's Comedy Songs," a compilation of songs all with lyrics by Blanche Merrill, most with music by Leo Edwards. With the exception of "I'm an Indian," none of the songs had been previously published, although nearly all of them had been written in the early 1920s. Ultimately she was not successful in steady work in radio and essentially retired.

=== 1940—1948 ===
In 1940, Merrill was engaged as one of the writers to supply material for a revue. It was to be produced by Leonard Sillman and, like others in his series of revues, provisionally titled New Faces. The revue would have brought back movie actors Joe Cook and Patsy Kelly to Broadway. Others names floated as possible cast members were Pert Kelton and Rags Ragland. As work progressed, the show was renamed to All in Fun with songwriters Baldwin Bergeson, June Sillman and John Rox, although Merrill was still considered the main songwriter. BMI acquired the music rights. When the show opened on December 27, 1940, of all the performers mentioned, only Pert Kelton remained. Merrill's name was not on the credits. The show ran for three performances before closing. One of the people in the cast was Imogene Coca whose apparent connection to Merrill would be useful ten years later.

In 1942 Variety indicated a plan for Horn & Hardart to have a radio show aimed at children, different from their long-running The Horn and Hardart Children's Hour. It was to be called Automatically Yours (a pun since Horn & Hardart had a chain of automats) and would have included songs by Blanche Merrill and Leo Edwards (the notice does not indicate whether these were new songs or revivals of materials the pair had written in the 1920s).

Blanche Merrill's connection to the Duncan Sisters did not end in 1932. When she opened her office in 1938, one of her first tasks was to write material for Rosetta Duncan. A 1946 advertisement for the Duncan Sisters appearing at Joaquin Garay's Copacabana in San Francisco stated that their act included "special material by Blanche Merrill." A year later, a notice in Variety indicated that the Duncan Sisters were planning to start their own record company. To be known as "Duncan Disc Co." they planned to have Merrill as their partner in the venture. Apparently, these plans never came to fruition. Although unpublished, the Duncan Sisters and Merrill co-authored at least four songs in 1947.

A 1946 notice in Variety stated that Merrill was writing a semi-autobiographical novel entitled "I Wrote a Song" for Random House. By 1949, she had completed the novel "written wholly in rhyme" which was scheduled for publication either in fall 1949 or spring 1950. The publication never occurred.

=== 1949-1952: Television ===
The earliest indication of Blanche Merrill's interest in television was a verse published in Variety at the beginning of 1949. Over the course of 89 rhyming lines, she portrays television as a new invention that sparks curiosity, and then a frantic rush to capitalize on it, resuscitating vaudeville careers while threatening the movie industry. The reference to resusciating vaudeville careers was either anticipatory or based on first-hand knowledge, for later that year a brief notice in Variety indicated that Merrill was getting back into vaudeville because it provided television content. Merrill was vacationing in Atlantic City during August 1949 while working on ideas for radio and television, including "a show for Sid Caesar." That turned out to be Your Show of Shows. Apparently having worked together on the flop All in Fun, Merrill had already been working with Imogene Coca (having written ten songs for her) when, in April 1951, producer Max Liebman signed Merrill to work exclusively for Coca on Your Show of Shows. Merrill's final words on the subject of television appear to be another verse entitled "Dear Mr. Sponsor" and published in Variety at the start of 1952. Her verse was written from the point of view of a housewife addressing a sponsor. Her main critiques were of the similarity of television programming no matter the station or program, and how sponsors' messages had become excessively intrusive.

=== 1951—1966 ===
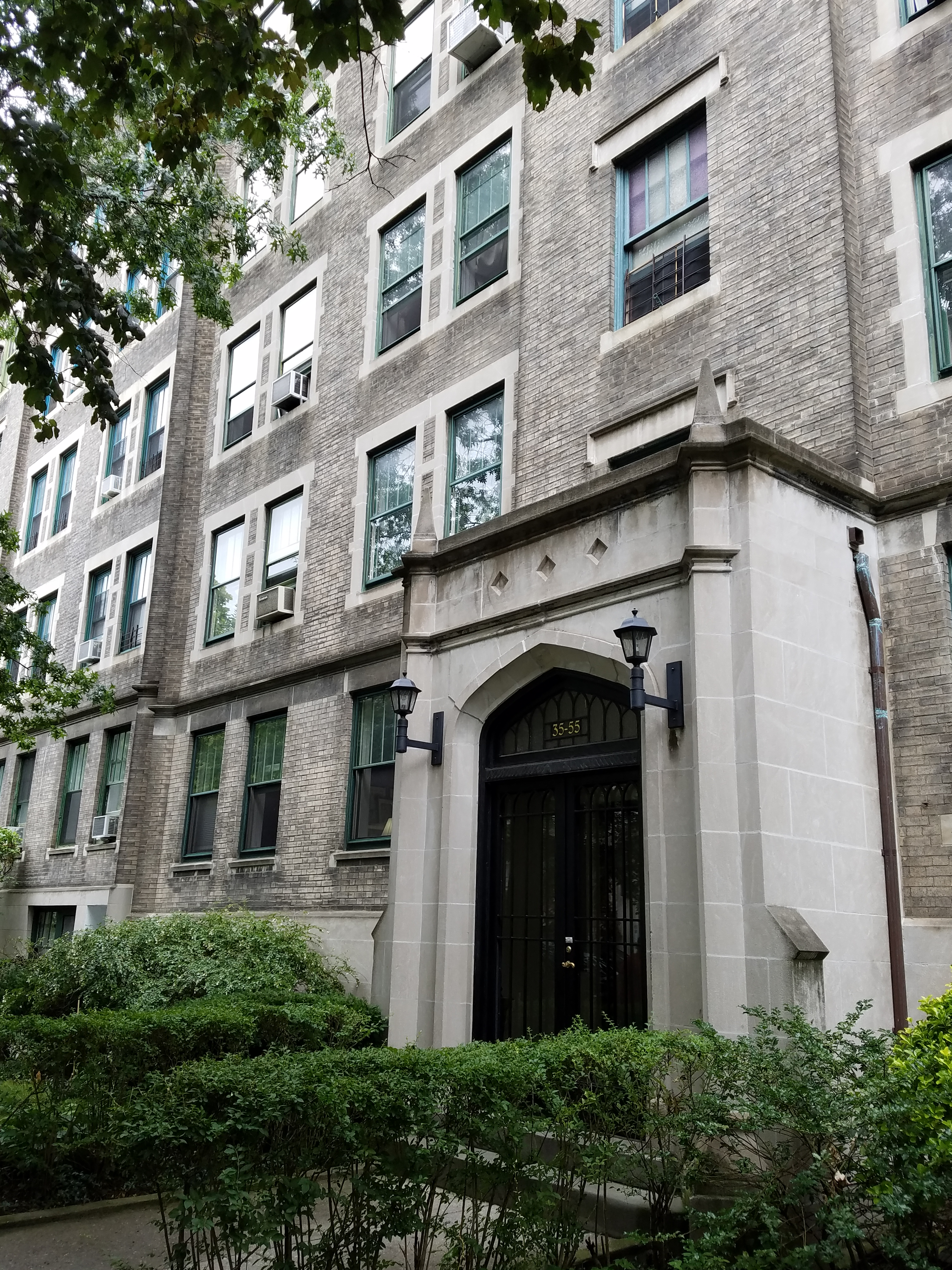
The apartment building at 35–55 80th Street, Queens, New York. Blanche Merrill lived there 1939–1966; her siblings lived there from 1926 to 1971

As she was retired, there is scant mention of Merrill's work after her brief foray into television. The French singer Irene Hilda (who dubbed Doris Day for the French version of the 1950 film Tea for Two) visited the U.S. in September 1952 and spent a month working with Merrill rehearsing a new act. Shooting High was a show presented at the Desert Inn in Las Vegas in 1952. The program indicated "Special material created by Bud Burston and Blanche Merrill." According to a relative, Merrill spent much of her time in retirement watching horse racing.

Blanche Merrill died on October 5, 1966. She had lived with her sister in the same apartment at 35–55 80th Street in Queens since the 1930s.

Having spoken with one of Merrill's relatives, author Barbara Wallace Grossman remarked: "Whatever papers and photographs [Merrill] left were destroyed following her sister's death in 1972. Sadly, there is no primary source material and remarkably little information currently available about one of America's first prolific female songwriters."

== Personal ==
Merrill's sister, Claire, married Cyril Kissane on June 24, 1926. He died on April 24, 1938, at age 46. He had worked for The Wall Street Journal since 1919, and had ascended to the position of managing editor. Along with Merrill, He lived with his wife at 35–55 80th Street in Jackson Heights, Queens.

Merrill's brother, W. Wallace Dreyfoos attended New York University School of Law and practiced law in Queens, becoming assistant district attorney. He died, age 47, of pneumonia on March 29, 1939.

Merrill's older sister, Theresa C. Dreyfoos, died September 23, 1958. The last of the Dreyfoos siblings, Claire Kissane, died in February 1971.

== Technique ==
Merrill knew her special skill resided in creating character songs. A 1915 advertisement for Lillian Shaw states: "Everybody knows that Lillian Shaw is the original character singer of character songs / songs written by Blanche Merrill (a real writer of character songs)."

As part of an article interviewing women songwriters, an anonymous author writing for The New York Sun was one of the few who raised the topic of the dearth of women in a field dominated by men. Comparing the composition of songs to sports, the author said that songwriting would be among the most difficult of tasks because women must have specialized knowledge to be able to write songs and be successful in the field. In response to what is the key to making songs work, Merrill replied "Give them Broadway in their songs." one Broadway manager said to her: "Blanche, always put just a little touch of the risque in your songs," an idea to which Merrill agreed. She said "I like to put human interest into a song. I try to make every line count, instead of depending on a couple of punch lines to get it across."

Part of Merrill's technique was meeting with a client (a performer), assessing their skills, noting their singing range an ability and seeing them on stage. In an interview Brice stated that she had the ideas for the songs, and Merrill wrote them out. The unidentified author of Variety article stated that that assertion contradicted what is known about Merrill's writing style. "It is a known fact" that Merrill used a separate contract for Brice in the Ziegfeld Follies that prohibited Brice or Ziegfeld to use the songs for anyone else without permission. Unlikely that Brice would have signed such a contract if she had been the originator of the songs.

One profile described her as an "efficiency expert in songwriting." She did not wait for inspiration. Rather, she knew she had a job and sat down to do it. She felt she produced her best work when under pressure. She appeared and worked in a businesslike manner.

Analyzing the 1925 interview with Brice from the Post, Barbara Wallace Grossman recounts that the germ of an idea started with Brice, at seeing incongruity and ridiculousness in ballet dancers, chasing nobody. Meanwhile, sentence fragments also occurred to Brice: "Oh, would I were a bird! I would fly in the spring!"

After thinking over the idea for a night, she would take the idea to Blanche Merrill and the two would work on it, Brice describing the setting and costumes, improvising and Merrill writing down ideas. Quoting Brice: "I giving my conception of the character and [Merrill] making a suggestion now and then and writing a line that might go with some movement of the ballet."

Merrill's technique in creating a song or act was to visualize the characters as real people. For the interviewer Mary Mullett, Merrill described creation of the song "Becky is Back in the Ballet." The title implies that Becky was away some place—Where? Why? What was the situation? Based on those questions, Merrill constructed an entire scenario which became the basis for the song's lyrics. "I can see Becky as plainly as I can see you. I know her and her big brother and her father and mother and all the rest of them. You see when I write a song it is almost like putting a whole story or a whole play into just a few verses."

The unique quality of Merrill's rhymes at the service of creating Becky's world can be seen in her lyrics for "Becky is Back in the Ballet."

VERSE
Becky was a dancer
Look how she danced
Nighttime and day she triptoed away
She got a job in the ballet
But one night her foot made a slip
She fell on her back
with oi! such a crack
She almost located her hip
They thought she was dead
from the bump on her head
She should be in bed but instead:

CHORUS
Becky is back in the ballet
Kicking her feet to the sky
Becky is back in the ballet
Doing a sweet butterfly
Look how she goes
Upon her toes
She can pose on her toes
on her big brother's nose
She flies, she can flitter
Hither and thither
her feet they go with her
She holds up the foot
while she smiles with the face
She tripples and skipples
all over the place
She shakes with a shiver
and quives with a quiver
Her father and mother will
never forgive her
Since Becky is back in the ballet.

CHORUS 2
Becky is back in the ballet
Dancing away with her feet
Becky is back in the ballet
Look she can ne'er do a spleet
She kicks to the front
The back and the side
Some day she will kick
and commit suicide
She kneels, it's a twister
From kneeling so much
on her knee is a blister
She goes all around
she goes all 'round the place
Someday she'll get dizzy
and fall on her face
No one can endure her
they'll kill her or cure her
Her father and mother are
goin' to insure her
Since Becky is back in the ballet.

Merrill recounted how she created the song "I Look Like the Last Rose of Summer" for Lillian Shaw:

"...I had to write a song for her and it was to be a German number: that is in German dialect. I hadn't any idea when I sat down to write it what it was going to be about: but I like objects, so I asked myself what object I could make use of in the song. And the first thing that came into my mind—heaven knows why!—was a baby carriage. Well, naturally, a baby carriage suggested a married woman. And there I was! The whole picture of the tired, forlorn, disillusioned, little immigrant mother and her views on matrimony came before my mind."

When I'm writing a song I do the words and melody together, as I go along. Perhaps that isn't the way other song writers do, but it happens to be my way. First I write a couple of lines of the words and then I get up and—you know—..." she shows the interviewers how she tried to fit the lines with rhythm and accent and motion.

Then I write a few more lines and get those so they will sing. Sing—and act! For these aren't drawing room songs, or concert songs. They are comedy songs. And that means they've got to be actable as well as singable. They don't read well because they are not in any regular meter."

There never was any vers libre in the world half so free as the verse for these comedy songs. The rhythm is all given by the music. And that changes oftener than weather in April. One of the ways of giving punch, for instance, is to give one or two words as much length, musically, as perhaps the next dozen words get. These tricks, if you want to call them that, make the song very effective; but when the lines are read they seem absolutely impossible."

All this is particularly true of songs like the one I was just speaking of, the one about the young German mother. When Lillian Shaw sang it she came on the stage pushing an old baby carriage with a fake baby in it. She wore an old brown dress and a shabby old hat and she just looked tired, tired, tired.

I LOOK LIKE THE LAST ROSE OF SUMMER

Verse:
Henry Blaum vas introduced to me
Ven I joost came here from Germany.
He vas fat an' foolish in der looks.
But he made love like dem fellows in der books.
Vee got married and I tell you what!
In my heart I vish dot vee vas not!
Love! Dot's nice! But take it right from me,
Marriage ain't vot it's crackled up to be!

Chorus:
From six in the morning till the sun goes down
I push and push this t'ing around'.
Oh dat's lovely I don't tink!
Look! Like de vater! Always crying for a drink!
If I were single once again,
I'd keep avay from der marriage mit der men.
Oh, vat a life you lead ven you're a vife!
I look like the last rose of summer, all faded avay.

== See also ==
- List of songs written by Blanche Merrill
- Fanny Brice
