= That's My Wife =

That's My Wife may refer to:

- That's My Wife (1929 film), an American comedy short featuring Laurel and Hardy
- That's My Wife (1933 film), a British film directed by Leslie S. Hiscott

== See also ==
- My Wife (disambiguation)
