= Oh My Girl (disambiguation) =

Oh My Girl is a South Korean girl group.

Oh My Girl may also refer to:

- Oh My Girl (EP), their 2015 debut EP
- Oh! My Girl!!, 2008 Japanese television series
- OMG (Oh, My Girl!), 2009 Filipino film

== See also ==
- My Girl (disambiguation)
