= My Girl =

My Girl may refer to:

== Music ==
- "My Girl" (The Temptations song), 1964; recorded by many artists
- "My Girl" (Amine song), 2006
- "My Girl" (Arashi song), 2009
- "My Girl" (Donnie Iris song), 1982
- "My Girl" (Dylan Scott song), 2016
- "My Girl" (The Fooo Conspiracy song), 2016
- "My Girl" (Hoodoo Gurus song), 1983
- "My Girl" (Isabel LaRosa song), 2025
- "My Girl" (Madness song), 1979
- "My Girl" (folk song) or "In the Pines", a traditional American folk song
- "My Girl (Gone, Gone, Gone)", a song by Chilliwack, 1981
- My Girl (EP), by Kim Hyung-jun, 2011
- "My Girl", a song by Aerosmith from Pump, 1989
- "My Girl", a song by Agua de Annique from Air, 2007
- "My Girl", a song by Alma from Have U Seen Her?, 2020
- "My Girl", a song by Frank Sinatra, 1952
- "My Girl", a song by Honorebel, 2010
- "My Girl", a song by Jagged Edge from The Remedy, 2011
- "My Girl", a song by Mindless Behavior from #1 Girl, 2011
- "My Girl", a song by Young Dro from Best Thang Smokin', 2006

== Film and television ==
- My Girl (film), a 1991 film starring Anna Chlumsky and Macaulay Culkin
  - My Girl 2, a sequel to the above film, released in 1994
- Fan Chan (English: My Girl), a 2003 Thai romantic comedy film
- My Girl (2005 TV series), a South Korean drama series
- My Girl (2008 TV series), a Philippine remake of the South Korean series
- My Girl (2020 TV series), a China streaming television series
- "My Girl" (Superman: The Animated Series), a television episode

== See also ==
- My Girls (disambiguation)
- My Boy (disambiguation)
- Oh My Girl (disambiguation)
- My Woman (disambiguation)
