= I'd Rather Be Blue =

Single by Fanny Brice
- A-side: "I'd Rather Be Blue"
- B-side: "If You Want the Rainbow (You Must Have the Rain)"
- Label: Victor Talking Machine Company
- Composer: Fred Fisher
- Lyricist: Billy Rose

"I'd Rather Be Blue" (or "I'd Rather Be Blue over You (Than Be Happy with Somebody Else)") is a song from the 1928 Warner Bros. musical film My Man, in which it was sung by Fanny Brice.

== Composition ==
The song was written by Fred Fisher and Billy Rose.

== Track listing ==
10" 78 rpm shellac record – Victor 21815, United States

A. "I'd Rather Be Blue"
B. "If You Want the Rainbow (You Must Have the Rain)"

== Fanny Brice version (1928) ==
Fanny Brice performed the song ("Comedienne with Orchestra") accompanied by Leonard Joy & his orchestra on a Victor sound recording (21815-A), which can be heard on "I'd Rather Be Blue" (Victor recording on the Internet Archive).

== Barbra Streisand version ==
"I'd Rather Be Blue over You (Than Be Happy with Somebody Else)"

Single by Barbra Streisand

from the album Funny Girl (The Original Sound Track Recording)
- A-side: "Funny Girl"
- B-side: "I'd Rather Be Blue over You (Than Be Happy with Somebody Else)"
- Released: 1968
- Recorded: June 23, 1968
- Studio: Studio C (New York, NY)
- Length: 2:28
- Label: Columbia Records
- Composer: Fred Fisher
- Lyricist: Billy Rose

Barbra Streisand singles chronology
"Our Corner of the Night" (1968)	"I'd Rather Be Blue over You (Than Be Happy with Somebody Else)" (1968)	"Honey Pie" (1969)

The song was performed by Barbra Streisand in the 1968 film Funny Girl. Her version reached number 19 on the Billboard Easy Listening chart.

=== Track listing ===
7" 45 rpm vinyl single – Columbia 4-44622, 1968, United States

1. "Funny Girl"
2. "I'd Rather Be Blue over You (Than Be Happy with Somebody Else)"

=== Charts ===
Chart (1968)	Peak position
US Adult Contemporary (Billboard)	19
