= My Woman =

My Woman or my woman may refer to:

- One's girlfriend or wife (German: Meine Frau)

== Music and film ==
- My Woman (album), a 2016 album by American singer-songwriter Angel Olsen
- My Woman (film), a 1933 American drama romance film
- "My Woman" (1932 song), by Lew Stone
- "My Woman, My Woman, My Wife", a 1970 song by American country singer Marty Robbins
- My Woman, My Woman, My Wife (Dean Martin album), 1970
- My Woman, My Woman, My Wife (Marty Robbins album), 1970

== See also ==
- My Wife (disambiguation)
- My Girl (disambiguation)
- My Man (disambiguation)
