= My Girls =

"My Girls" may refer to:

- "My Girls" (Animal Collective song), from their 2009 album Merriweather Post Pavilion
- "My Girls" (Christina Aguilera song), from her 2010 album Bionic
- "My Girls", a song by XO-IQ, featured in the television series Make It Pop

== See also ==
- My Girl (disambiguation)
