= That's My Boy =

That's My Boy may refer to:

== Film and television ==
- That's My Boy (1932 film), a drama starring Richard Cromwell, Dorothy Jordan, Mae Marsh and John Wayne
- That's My Boy (1951 film), a comedy starring Dean Martin and Jerry Lewis
- That's My Boy (1954 TV series), a 1954 American comedy based on the 1951 Martin and Lewis film that aired on CBS
- That's My Boy (1963 TV series), a 1963 British television series that aired only in the Midlands and Northern England
- That's My Boy (1981 TV series), a 1981–1986 British comedy made by Yorkshire Television for ITV
- That's My Boy (2012 film), a comedy starring Adam Sandler and Andy Samberg

== Music ==
- "That's My Boy", a 1954 song by Elaine Stritch
- "That's My Boy", a 1957 song by Stan Freberg from A Child's Garden of Freberg
- That's My Boy!, a 1977 album by accordionist Steve Jordan
- "That's My Boy", a 2019 song by Justin Moore from Late Nights and Longnecks

== See also ==
- My Boy (disambiguation)
- Watching Scotty Grow
