= List of songs written by Blanche Merrill =

This is a list of songs by Blanche Merrill. In all cases she wrote the lyrics, so there is no separate column for lyricist. In a handful of cases she also composed the music although most of the time music was composed by others, often by Leo Edwards. In some cases the credit is listed as "words and music by Blanche Merrill and ..." this phraseology has been incorporated into the appropriate cell.

For published songs, the source of information is the publication itself. For unpublished songs, the source of information the song's mention in reviews, or the Library of Congress's Catalog of Copyright Entries.

The majority of Merrill's unpublished songs are probably lost, although copies could exist in the archives of the various performers for whom she wrote. The Library of Congress's copyright deposit would also have copies of songs which she copyrighted but never published.

Title	Show or vaudeville act	Music composed by	Written for	Publisher	Year of publication (or first mention)	Source
Ain't That Always the Way		Leo Edwards	Fanny Brice		1939	First published in Fanny Brice's Comedy Songs
Becky is Back in the Ballet		Leo Edwards	Fanny Brice	New York: Shapiro, Bernstein & Co.	1922	First performed in 1915.
Best That You Get When You Get It is Only an Even Break, The	An Even Break		Mollie Fuller		1925	
Bootlegger's Bride, The			Belle Baker?		1927	
Boots, Boots, Boots		Jean Schwartz		New York: Waterson, Berlin & Snyder	1918	
Breaking Home Ties					1923	
Broadway Sam	Passing Show of 1915	Leo Edwards	Willie Howard		1915	
Buckwheat Cake Tosser in Child's, The ("The Buckwheat Tosser")	Ziegfeld Follies of 1924		Edna Leedom		1924	
Bye and Bye		Leo Edwards	Horace Wright and Rene Dietrich	New York: Chas. K. Harris	1912	
Coat of Mine		M.K. Jerome		New York: Waterson, Berlin & Snyder	1919	
Dance of the Rake, The		Leo Edwards	Fanny Brice		1939	First published in Fanny Brice's Comedy Songs
Dancing Mad	Ziegfeld Follies of 1923	Leo Edwards	Edna Leedom, Fanny Brice		1923	IBDB,
Dippy Doodle-Um (The Crazy Quilt Song)		M.K. Jerome		New York: Waterson, Berlin & Snyder	1919	
Dog's Tale of Love, A			Anna Chandler		1921	
Dying Swan, The	Ziegfeld Follies of 1916	Leo Edwards	Fanny Brice		1916	
Egotistical Eva		Blanche Merrill	Eva Tanguay	New York: Chas. K. Harris	1910	
Egyptian	Ziegfeld Follies of 1917	Leo Edwards	Fanny Brice		1917	First published in Fanny Brice's Comedy Songs
Every Little Heart That's Lonely		Leo Edwards		New York: Shapiro, Bernstein & Co.	1923	Arr. By Ed. Morbach Jr.
Getting Mad Was Never Made For Us		Blanche Merrill	John Hyams and Leila McIntyre	New York: Waterson, Berlin & Snyder	1914	Cover
Girl I Used To Be, The	Life		Mable McCane		1924	
Give an Imitation of Me		Blanche Merrill	Eva Tanguay	New York: Chas. K. Harris	1910	
Good Night Blue Eyes		Leo Edwards		New York: Waterson, Berlin & Snyder	1918	
Hat, The	Ziegfeld Follies of 1916	Leo Edwards	Fanny Brice		1916	
Here's To You, My Sparkling Wine		Leo Edwards		New York: G. Schirmer	1915	
Hocus Pocus					1923	
Humpty Dumpty	The Trained Nurses	Leo Edwards		New York: Chas. K. Harris	1912	
I am a Thief	The Burglar		Maurice Burkhardt		1916	
I Can't Be True To One Little Girl When Another Little Girl Comes 'Round	The Trained Nurses	Leo Edwards		New York: Chas. K. Harris	1912	
I Can't Do This I can't Do That	Page Mister Cupid	Jean Schwartz		New York: Jerome H. Remick & Co.	1920	Alternative titles: Don't ever wear that tie again it's so loud it makes me start Why I can't do this and I can't do that
I Can't Help It		Blanche Merrill	Eva Tanguay	New York: Chas. K. Harris	1910	Cover
I Don't Care Any More Than I Used To			Eva Tanguay		1923	
I Don't Know Whether to Do It or Not		Blanche Merrill	Fanny Brice		1915	Known from recording.
I Got a Rock		Blanche Merrill	Lillian Shaw	New York: Chas. K. Harris	1911	cover
I Look Like the Last Rose of Summer		Blanche Merrill?	Lillian Shaw		1917	
I Want To Dance, Dance, Dance		Leo Edwards	Edith Cliford, Harry Tighe / Mae West	New York: Chas. K. Harris	1912	Cover
I Was All Right When Things Were All Wrong	So This Is Love		Ann Butler		1925	
If Anything Happens, It Happens To Me	Ziegfeld Follies of 1924		Edna Leedom		1924	
If You Love Me Like I Love You		Gus Edwards			1934	
Ike Don't Make No Strike		Leo Edwards		New York: Chas. K. Harris	1913	
I'll Get Along Somehow	Life		Mable McCane		1924	
I'm a Harmony Baby		Blanche Merrill, Harry De Costa, M.K. Jerome, Fred Rich		New York: Waterson, Berlin & Snyder	1923	Lyrics by Blanche Merrill, Harry De Costa, M. K. Jerome and Fred Rich
I'm a Hieland Lassie		Leo Edwards	Fanny Brice		1921	Originally titled "Bony hei'land lassie"; "melody by L. Edwards, arr. By Ed. Marbach"; First published in Fanny Brice's Comedy Songs
I'm a Little Butterfly		Edwin Weber	Fanny Brice		1939	First published in Fanny Brice's Comedy Songs
I'm an Indian		Leo Edwards	Fanny Brice	New York: Mills Music	1922	First mentioned in 1918; Reprinted in Fanny Brice's Comedy Songs
I'm Bad		Leo Edwards	Fanny Brice		1939	First published in Fanny Brice's Comedy Songs
I'm From Chicago		Leo Edwards		New York : Waterson, Berlin & Snyder	1917	
I'll Goin' To Be Bad	Life		Mable McCane		1924	
I'm Going to Build a Theatre of My Own			Sonia Meroff		1921	
I'm Looking for a Blue Bird (to Chase My Blues Away)		Fred Rich		New York: Maurice Richmond	1921	
I'm Lucky To Get By		Leo Edwards	Eva Tanguay	New York: Chas. K. Harris	1913	Cover
I've Dug All I Could, But See What I'm Getting			Anna Chandler		1921	
If We Could Only Take Their Word		Leo Edwards	Fanny Brice		1939	Performed in the Ziegfeld Follies of 1916
If You Want a Little Doggie, Whistle and I'll Come To You		Leo Edwards		New York: Chas. K. Harris	1915	
If You Want to Know Them Yes Them			Bobby Folsom		1926	
In a Little Cottage By the Railroad Track	Davey's Troubles	Blanche Merrill	Herman Timberg	New York: Waterson, Berlin & Snyder	1913	
In a Pretty Little White House of Our Own	Ziegfeld Follies	Leo Edwards		New York: Chas. K. Harris	1912	
In My Streamlined Trailer		Words and music by the Duncan Sisters & Blanche Merrill	Duncan Sisters		1947	Catalog of Copyright Entries, p. 4793
In the Corner of My Heart		Words and music by the Duncan Sisters & Blanche Merrill	Duncan Sisters		1947	Catalog of Copyright Entries, p. 4844
In the Days of Girls and Boys		Leo Edwards			1911	
It's a Dog's Life	Life		Mable McCane		1924	
It's All a High Hat					1923	Song satirizing Henry Ford's ambition to be president. Lyric published in Variety
Jake! Jake! The Yiddisha Ball-Player		Irving Berlin		New York: Waterson, Berlin & Snyder	1913	
Jazz Baby		M.K. Jerome		New York: Waterson, Berlin & Snyder	1919	
Jumping Into Something			George A. Whiting and Sadie Burt		1926	Possibly the same as "We're Jumping Into Something"
Just 'Round the Corner from Broadway		Gus Edwards	Gus Edwards	New York: Shapiro, Bernstein & Co.	1914	Cover
K-I-S-S Kiss	The Trained Nurses	Leo Edwards		New York: Chas. K. Harris	1912	
Let's Pretend We're Kids Again		Gus Edwards			1934	
Little Jazz Band of Our Own, A			Eva Tanguay		1921	
Little Wigwam For Two, A	Page Mister Cupid	Jean Schwartz		New York: Jerome H. Remick & Co.	1920	
Love is an Old Fashion'd Feeling	Page Mister Cupid	Jean Schwartz		New York: Jerome H. Remick & Co.	1920	
Low Heel Shoes		Hazel Flynn	Lulu McConnell		1939	
Make 'Em Laugh	Around the World	Edwin Weber	Fanny Brice		1922	First published in Fanny Brice's Comedy Songs (New York: Mills Music, 1939).
May Walk		Blanche Merrill				
Melodious Jazz		M.K. Jerome		New York: Waterson, Berlin & Snyder	1920	
Moll, The		Jack Stanley			1933	
Money		Blanche Merrill	Eva Tanguay	New York: Chas. K. Harris	1911	Cover
Moving Picture Baby	Music Box Revue (1925)	Leo Edwards	Fanny Brice		1925	Billboard, August 15, 1925, p. 90.
My Bill					1923	
My Little Dancing Heart	Page Mister Cupid	Jean Schwartz		New York: Jerome H. Remick & Co.	1920	
My Syncopated Melody Man		Blanche Merrill and Eddie Cox		New York: Meyer Cohen Music Publishing	1918	Lyrics by Blanche Merrill and Eddie Cox
'Neath the Light of the Twinkling Star		Leo Edwards		New York: Chas. K. Harris	1913	
Nosie Rosie Posie		Leo Edwards	Trixie Friganza	New York: Chas. K. Harris	1912	Cover
Oh! God! Let My Dream Come True!		Al Piantadosi		Shapiro, Bernstein & Co.	1916	
Oh, That Heavenly Man		Leo Edwards		New York: Chas. K. Harris	1913	
Old Established Firm	Puzzles of 1925		Jimmy Hussey		1925	Variety
Page Mister Cupid	Page Mister Cupid	Jean Schwartz		New York: Jerome H. Remick & Co.	1920	
Painted Rose		Blanche Merrill & James Hanley			1930	Unpublished; "Words and melody by Blanche Merrill and James Hanley"
Pavlowa	Greenwich Village Follies of 1921	Leo Edwards	Fanny Brice		1921	First published in Fanny Brice's Comedy Songs
Poor Little Cinderella	Dance and Grow Thin	Blanche Merrill		New York: Irving Berlin Inc.	1917	
Poor Little Moving Picture Baby		Leo Edwards	Fanny Brice		1939?	First published in Fanny Brice's Comedy Songs
(Poor Little) Wall Flower	Jack and Jill	Muriel Pollock			1923	
Pretty Birdie	Dance and Grow Thin	Blanche Merrill		New York: Irving Berlin Inc.	1917	
Put a Little Letter in My Letter Box	Dance and Grow Thin	Blanche Merrill		New York: Irving Berlin Inc.	1917	
Quack, Quack		Arthur Freed	Marie Callahan and Billy Hanson		1927	
Queen of the May		Blanche Merrill	Rosetta Duncan		1932	
Ragtime Drama, A		Blanche Merrill			1917	A Ragtime Drama with Ada Jones and Billy Murray, recorded by the Victor Talking Machine Company on January 23, 1917, matrix B-19114 and issued as Victor 18288-B.
Result of Going to Dancing School, The		Arthur Freed?	Fanny Brice		1927	
Rolling Down the River		Blanche Merrill ?	Dora Maugham		1930	
Russian Art		Leo Edwards	Fanny Brice		1939	First published in Fanny Brice's Comedy Songs
Shadowland		Gus Edwards	Gus Edwards	New York : Shapiro, Bernstein & Co.	1914	Cover
Society Debutante			Fanny Brice		Before 1926	
Spring		Leo Edwards	Fanny Brice		1922	First published in Fanny Brice's Comedy Songs (New York: Mills Music, 1939).
Strawberries in January		Duncan Sisters	Duncan Sisters		1947	Catalog of Copyright Entries, p. 4793
Tanguay Rag		Blanche Merrill	Eva Tanguay	New York: Chas. K. Harris	1910	Cover
Tanguay Tangle		Leo Edwards	Eva Tanguay	New York: Chas. K. Harris	1913	Cover
That's Why I'm Back Again		Blanche Merrill ?	Dora Maugham		1930	
There is Life in the Old Boy Yet	Page Mister Cupid	Jean Schwartz		New York: Jerome H. Remick & Co.	1920	
There's Dirty Work Down in Denmark	Ziegfeld Follies of 1924		Edna Leedom		1924	
They Think I'm Nutty On and off		Blanche Merrill	Eva Tanguay	New York: Chas. K. Harris	1911	
This is the Day		M.K. Jerome		New York: Waterson, Berlin & Snyder	1919	
Those Bad, Bad Women of History		Blanche Merrill ?	Dora Maugham		1930	
Toodle-Oodle-oo		M.K. Jerome		New York: Waterson, Berlin & Snyder	1919	At some point interpolated into the Greenwich Village Follies of 1921
Toothache		Arnold New			1933	
Trailing Along in a Trailer		Leo Edwards	Fanny Brice	New York: Mills Music	1936	
Twit, Twit, Twit		Jean Schwartz		New York: Waterson, Berlin & Snyder	1918	
We Take Our Hats off to You, Mr. Wilson!		Blanche Merrill		New York: Leo Feist Inc.	1914	
Welcome Stranger			Belle Baker		1921	
Welcome Stranger		Duncan Sisters			1947	Catalog of Copyright Entries, p. 4793
We're Jumping Into Something	Puzzles of 1925	Blanche Merrill	Jimmy Hussey, (Helen Broderick)		1925	Variety Possibly the same as "Jumping Into Something"
We've had a lovely time, so long, good bye	The Trained Nurses	Leo Edwards		New York: Chas. K. Harris	1912	
What Is it Happened To Me?	Life		Mable McCane		1924	
What Price Love			George Whiting and Sadie Burt		1926	
When the Cat's Away	Puzzles of 1925		Dorothy Appleby		1925	
While They Were Dancing Around		Leo Edwards		New York: Chas. K. Harris	1912	
Whistle and Help me Along	The Trained Nurses	Leo Edwards		New York: Chas. K. Harris	1912	
Whose Little Girl is the Girl You're With Tonight		Leo Edwards		New York: Edward B. Marks Music	1925	
Why Didn't I Meet You Long Ago	Page Mister Cupid	Jean Schwartz		New York: Jerome H. Remick & Co.	1920	
Will You Bring Back My Bonnie To Me		Leo Edwards	Emma Carus	New York: Chas. K. Harris	1912	Cover
You Can't Believe Them			Ann Ford and George Goodridge		1921	
Zulu Zo			Anna Chandler		1921	
