= Fanny Brice =

American actress, singer, and comedian (1891–1951)

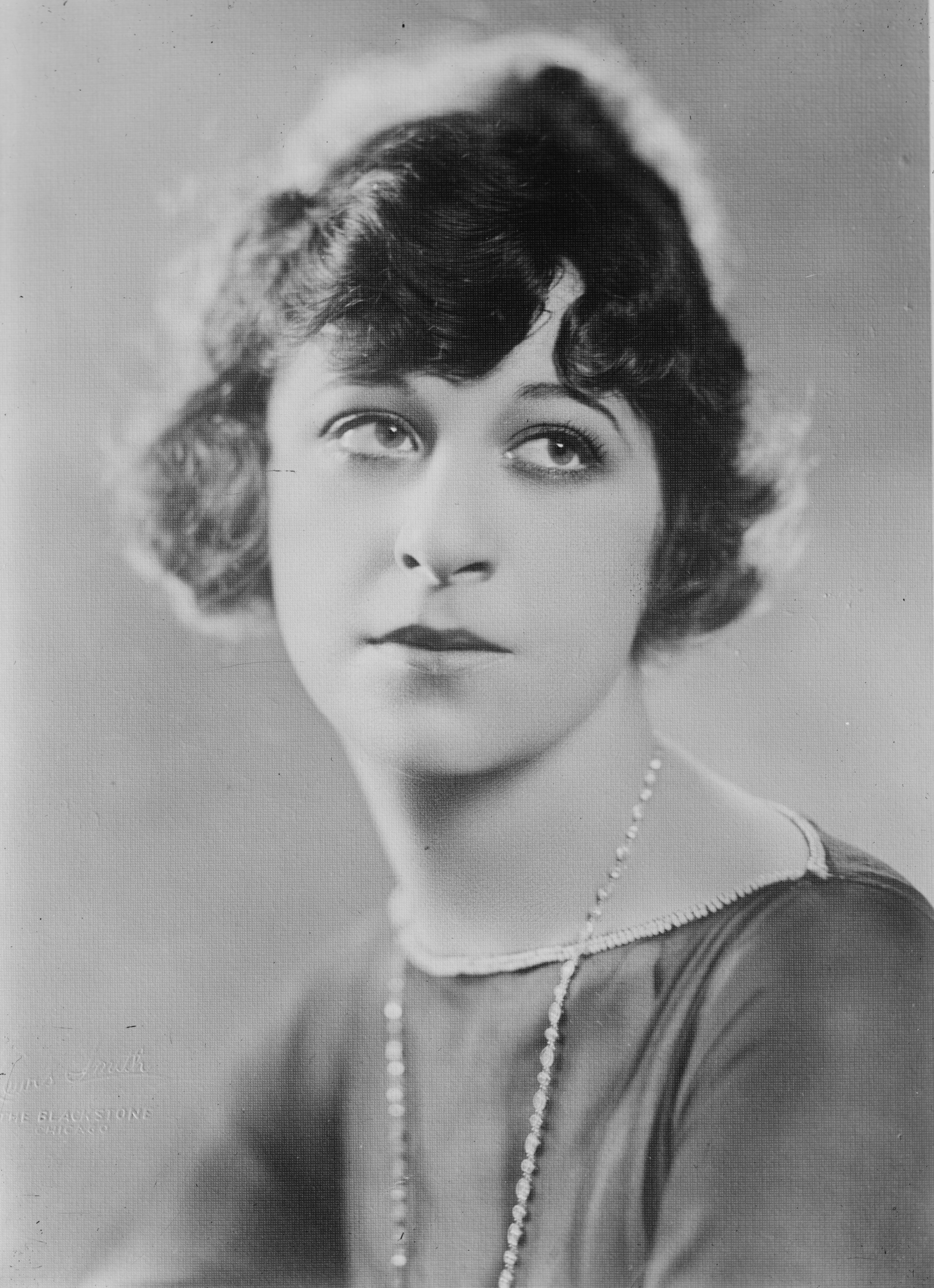
- Brice circa 1920
- Born: Fania Borach; October 29, 1891; New York City, U.S.
- Died: May 29, 1951 (aged 59); Los Angeles, California, U.S.
- Occupations: Comedian, song model, singer, actress
- Years active: 1908–1951
- Spouses: Frank White (m. 1910; div. 1913) Julius "Nicky" Arnstein (m. 1918; div. 1927) Billy Rose (m. 1929; div. 1938)
- Children: 2, including William Brice

Fania Borach (October 29, 1891 – May 29, 1951), known professionally as Fanny Brice or Fannie Brice, was an American comedian, illustrated song model, singer, and actress who made many stage, radio, and film appearances. She is known as the creator and star of the top-rated radio comedy series The Baby Snooks Show.

Her life story was loosely adapted into the stage musical Funny Girl. Brice was portrayed by Barbra Streisand in both the original Broadway production of the musical and its 1968 film adaptation.

== Early life ==
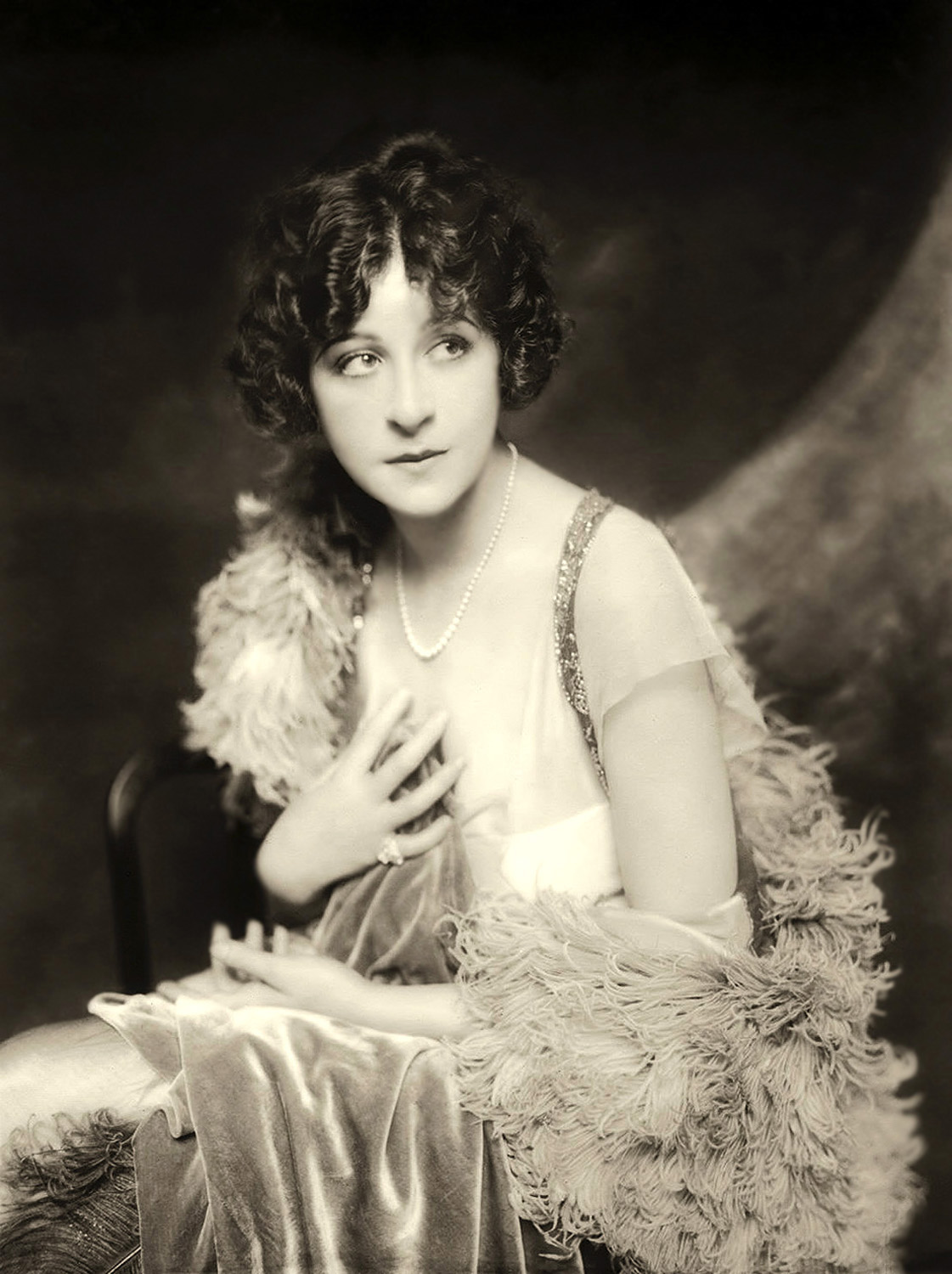
Brice c. 1910s or early 1920s publicity photo

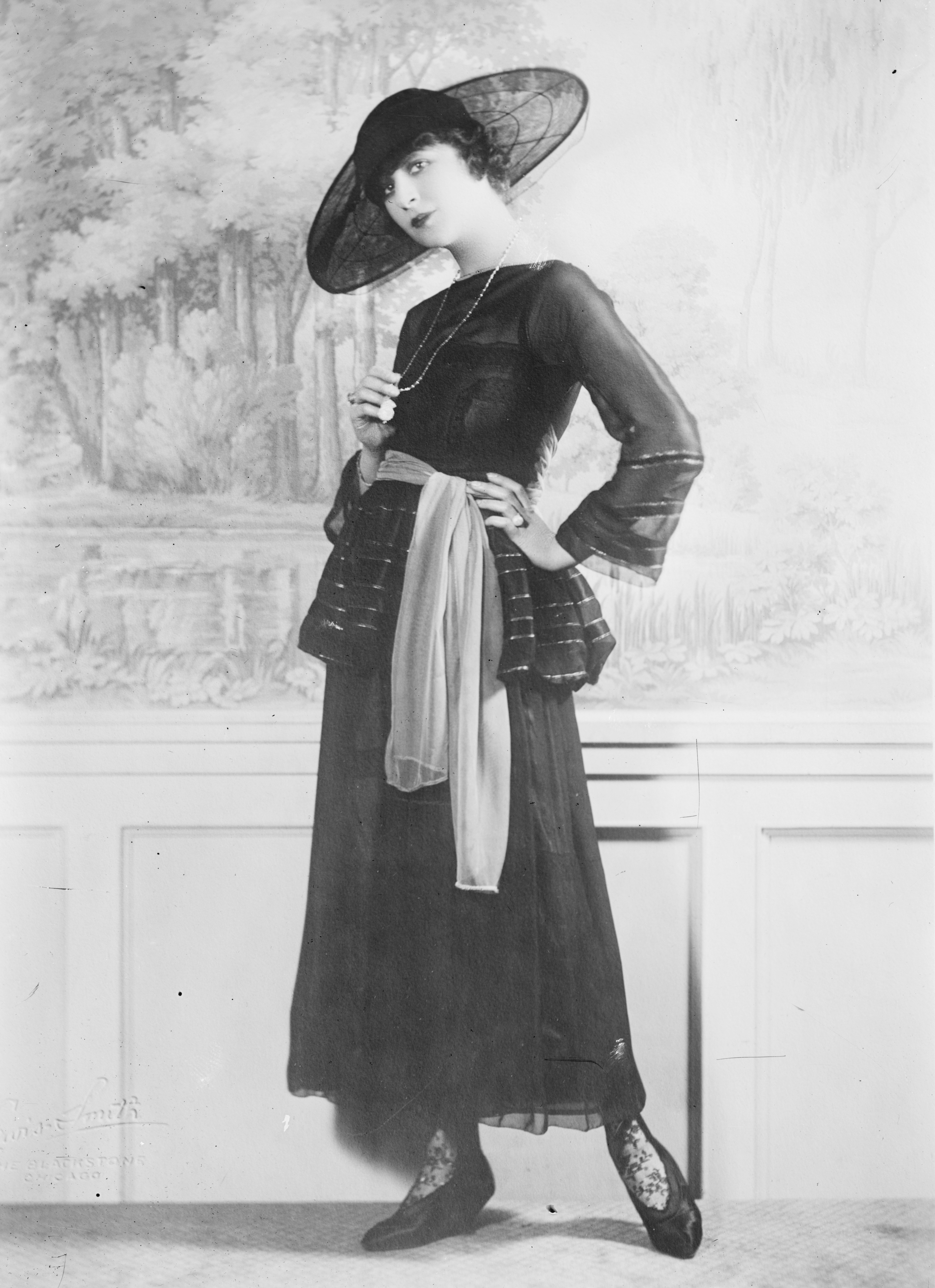
Brice c. late 1910s

Fania Borach was born in Manhattan, New York City, United States, the third child of Rose (née Stern; 1867–1941), a Jewish Hungarian woman who immigrated to the U.S. at age 10, and Jewish Alsatian immigrant Charles Borach. The Borachs were saloon owners and had four children: Phillip, born in 1887; Carrie, born in 1889; Fania, born in 1891; and Louis, born in 1893. Under the name Lew Brice, her younger brother also became an entertainer and was the first husband of actress Mae Clarke.

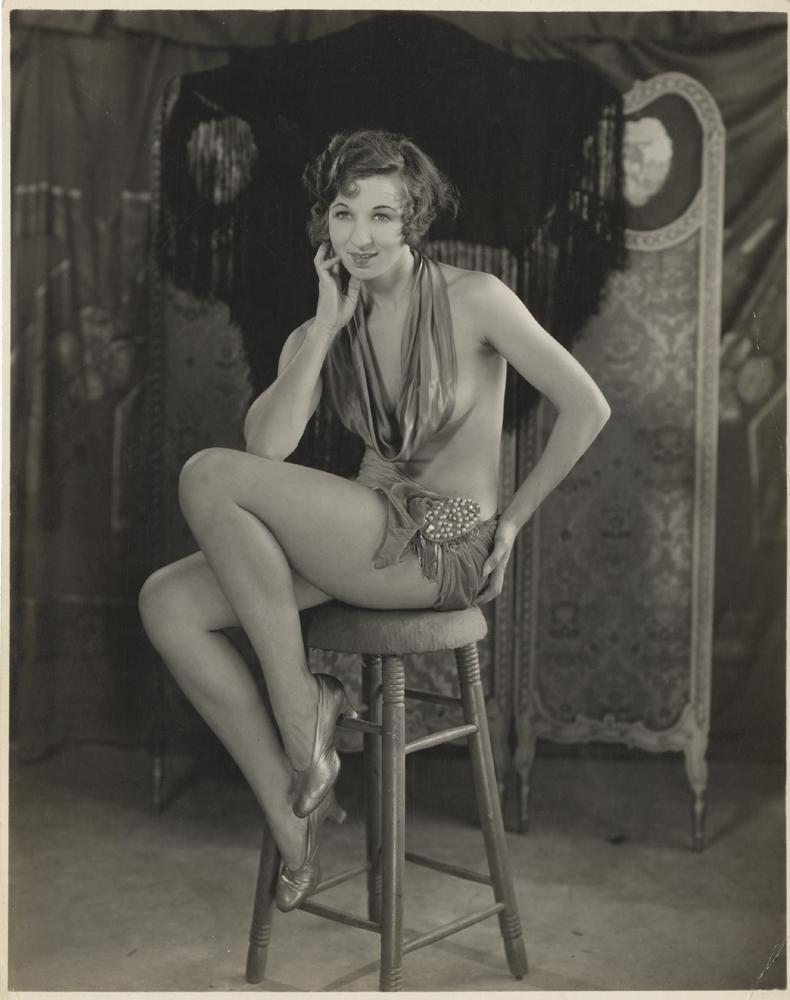
Fanny Brice, Follies girl, circa 1915

In 1908, Brice dropped out of school to work in a burlesque revue, "The Girls from Happy Land Starring Sliding Billy Watson". Two years later, she began her association with Florenz Ziegfeld, headlining his Ziegfeld Follies in 1910 and 1911. She was hired again in 1921 and performed in the Follies into the 1930s.

In the 1921 Follies, she was featured singing "My Man", which became both a big hit and her signature song. She made a popular recording of it for the Victor Talking Machine Company. The second song most associated with Brice is "Second Hand Rose", which she also introduced in the Ziegfeld Follies of 1921.

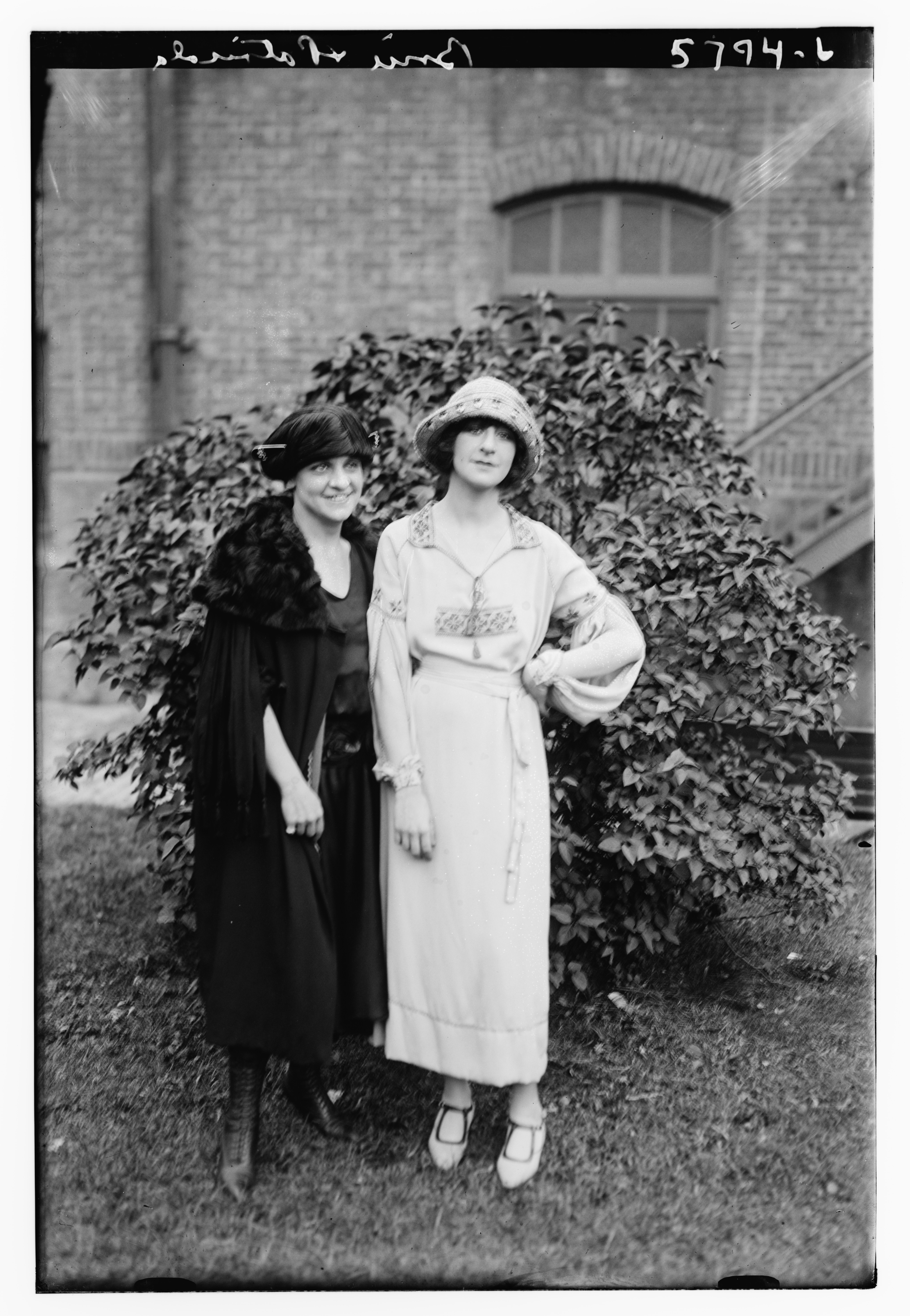
Fanny Brice and Patricola

She recorded nearly two dozen record sides for Victor, and also cut several for Columbia Records. She is a posthumous recipient of a Grammy Hall of Fame Award for her 1921 recording of "My Man".

Brice's Broadway credits include Fioretta, Sweet and Low, and Billy Rose's Crazy Quilt. Her films include My Man (1928, a lost film), Be Yourself! (1930), and Everybody Sing (1938) with Judy Garland. Brice, Ann Pennington, and Harriet Hoctor were the only original Ziegfeld performers to portray themselves in The Great Ziegfeld (1936) and Ziegfeld Follies (1946).

== Radio ==
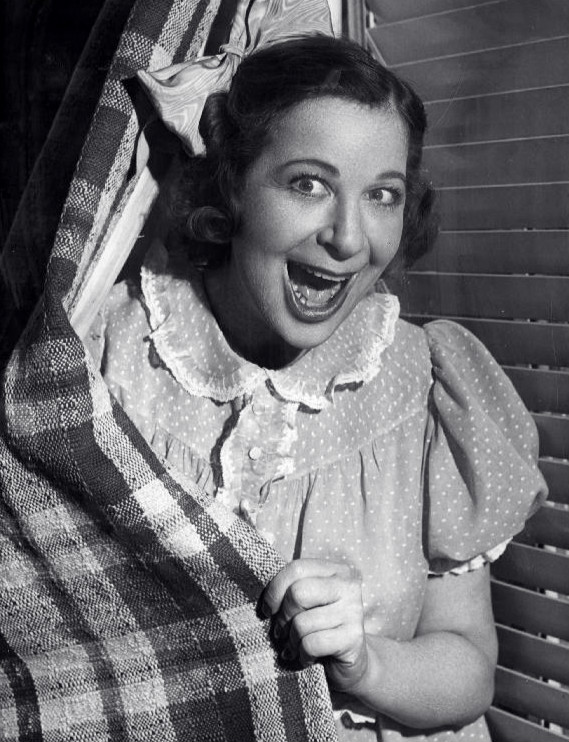
Brice in the role of Baby Snooks, 1940

Brice's first radio show was the Philco Hour in February 1930. Brice's first regular radio show was probably The Chase and Sanborn Hour, a 30-minute program which ran on Wednesday nights at 8 pm in 1933.

From the 1930s until her death in 1951, Fanny made a radio presence as a bratty toddler named Snooks, a role she had premiered in a Follies skit co-written by playwright Moss Hart. Baby Snooks premiered in The Ziegfeld Follies of the Air in February 1936 on CBS, with Alan Reed playing Lancelot Higgins, her beleaguered "Daddy." Brice moved to NBC Radio in December 1937, performing the Snooks routines as part of the Good News show, then in 1940 on Maxwell House Coffee Time, with the half-hour divided between the Snooks sketches and actor Frank Morgan.

By September 1944, Brice's sketch writers Philip Rapp and David Freedman brought in Arthur Stander and Everett Freeman, who developed a half-hour comedy program for CBS radio, Post Toasties Time, later The Baby Snooks Show. Produced by Everett Freeman, it launched in 1944, moving to NBC in 1948. Hanley Stafford played the Daddy and Fannie Brice the main character, Baby Snooks. Other co-stars included Lalive Brownell, Lois Corbet, and Arlene Harris each in turn as her mother, Danny Thomas as Jerry, Charlie Cantor as Uncle Louie, and Ken Christy as Mr. Weemish.

She returned on Tallulah Bankhead's big-budget, large-scale radio variety show The Big Show in November 1950, sharing the bill with Groucho Marx and Jane Powell.

== Television appearance ==
Fanny Brice's only appearance on television was on June 12, 1950, in a performance on CBS-TV's Popsicle Parade of Stars, as Baby Snooks.

== Personal life ==
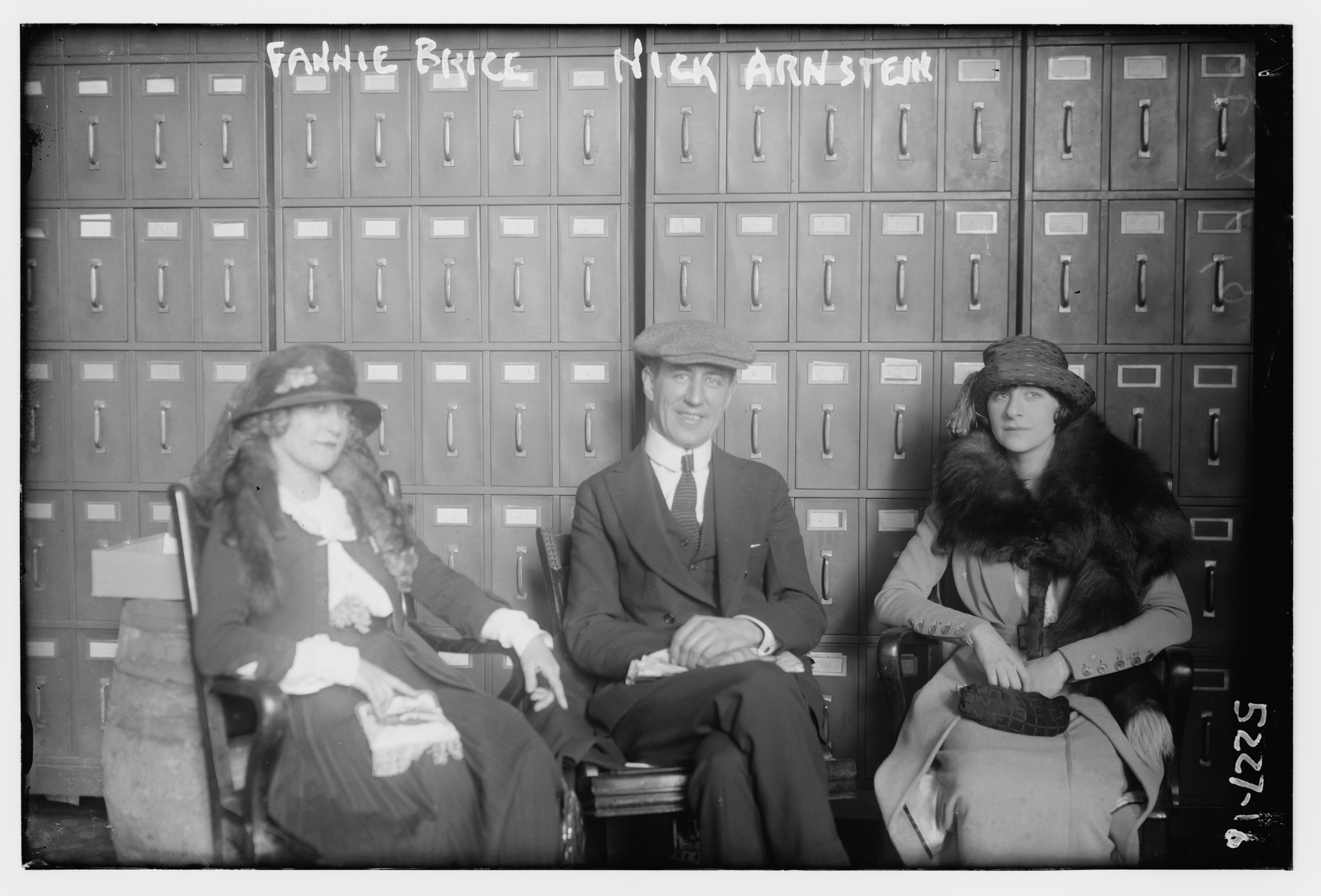
Fanny Brice & Nick Arnstein, 1915

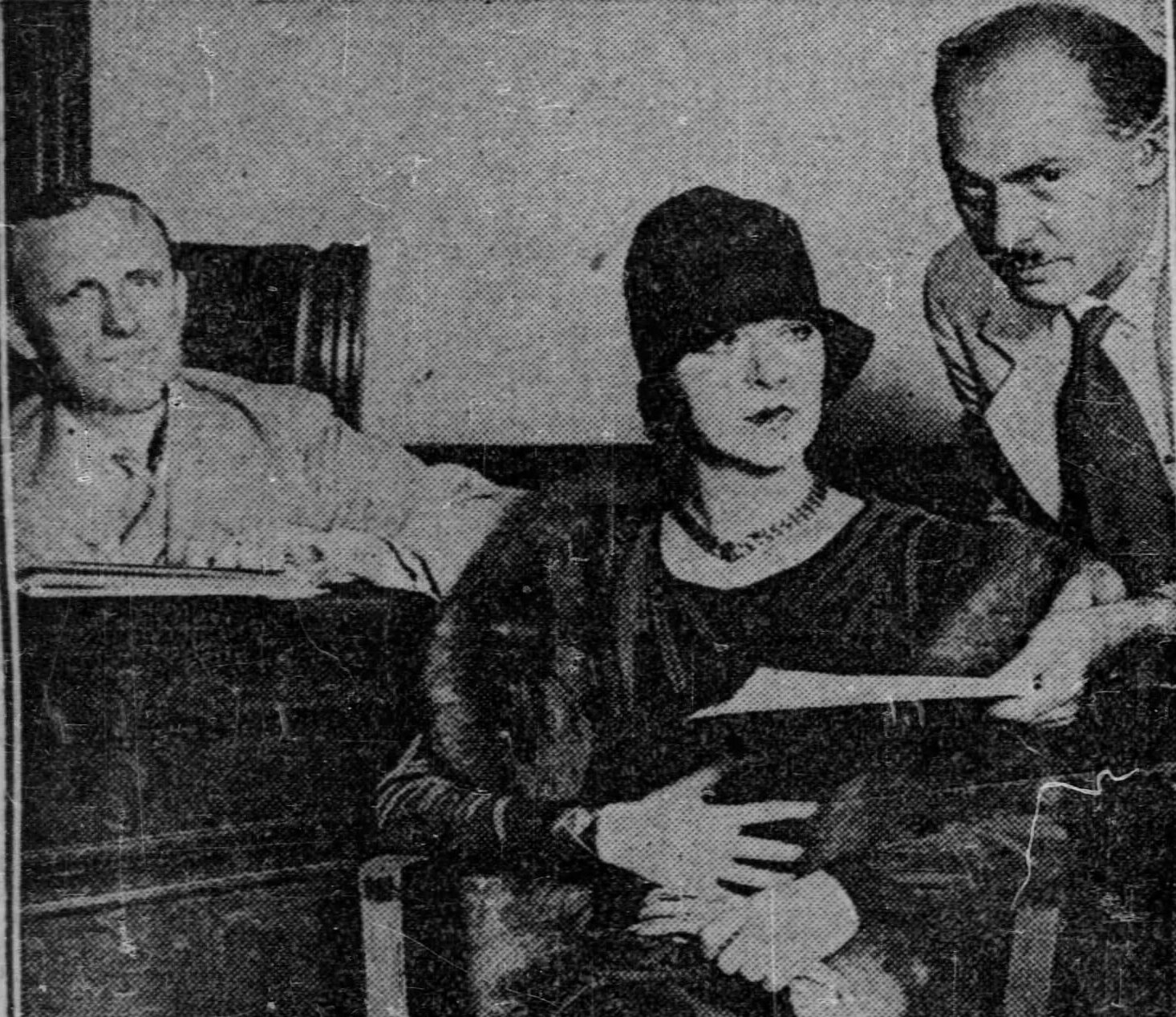
Judge Otto Kerner Sr. (left) of the Circuit Court of Cook County granting Brice (center) a divorce decree in September 1927 (Brice's attorney, Benjamin H. Ehrlich, is in the far-right of the photograph)

Brice had a short-lived marriage in her late teens to a barber, Frank White, whom she met in 1910 in Springfield, Massachusetts, when she was touring in College Girl. The marriage lasted three years and she brought suit for divorce in 1913.

In August 1922, Brice sailed to Europe with Sally, a chimpanzee, aboard the RMS Homeric.

"Snooks first came into being at a private party in Manhattan. In the course of singing a patter song, Poor Pauline (Arthur Fields), Miss Brice lapsed into baby talk. Years later Moss Hart wrote a Snooks skit for Sweet and Low, but Snooks was officially recognized when she was included in the Brice routine for the 1934 Follies."

Her second husband was professional gambler and con man Nicky Arnstein. Brice and Arnstein lived together for three years before he was convicted of a wiretapping fraud in 1915. Brice visited Arnstein in prison every week during the 14 months he served in Sing Sing, pawned her jewelry to pay for appeals and eventually secured him a pardon. They were married in 1918, one week after Arnstein obtained a divorce from his first wife. In 1920, Arnstein was charged with conspiracy to sell $5 million of stolen Wall Street bonds. Brice insisted on his innocence and funded his legal defense at great expense and the case went to the Supreme Court while Arnstein remained free on bail. Eventually Arnstein was sentenced to two years in the federal penitentiary at Leavenworth. Arnstein was released December 22, 1925 with 72 days time off for good behavior and joined Brice in Chicago where she was performing. Brice divorced him in Chicago on September 14, 1927 on grounds of infidelity and loss of affection. They had two children: Frances Brice Stark (1919-1992), who married film producer Ray Stark, and William (1921–2008), who became an artist using his mother's surname. Ray Stark later went on to produce the stage musical and film Funny Girl loosely based on the life of Fanny. Stark also produced a follow-up film Funny Lady.

Brice wed lyricist and stage producer Billy Rose in 1929.

In 1929, Fanny Brice lived at 306 West 76th Street, New York City.

She appeared in his revue Billy Rose's Crazy Quilt (1931), among others.

"In 1937, with her marriage to Billy Rose disintegrating, she moved to California. They were divorced on October 27, 1938."

Brice attended the Chouinard Art Institute to study painting.

Fanny Brice resided in a house built in 1938 on North Faring Road in Holmby Hills, Los Angeles, designed by the architect John Elgin Woolf (1908-1980). The house was entirely gutted and rebuilt from the foundation up between 2001 and 2008.

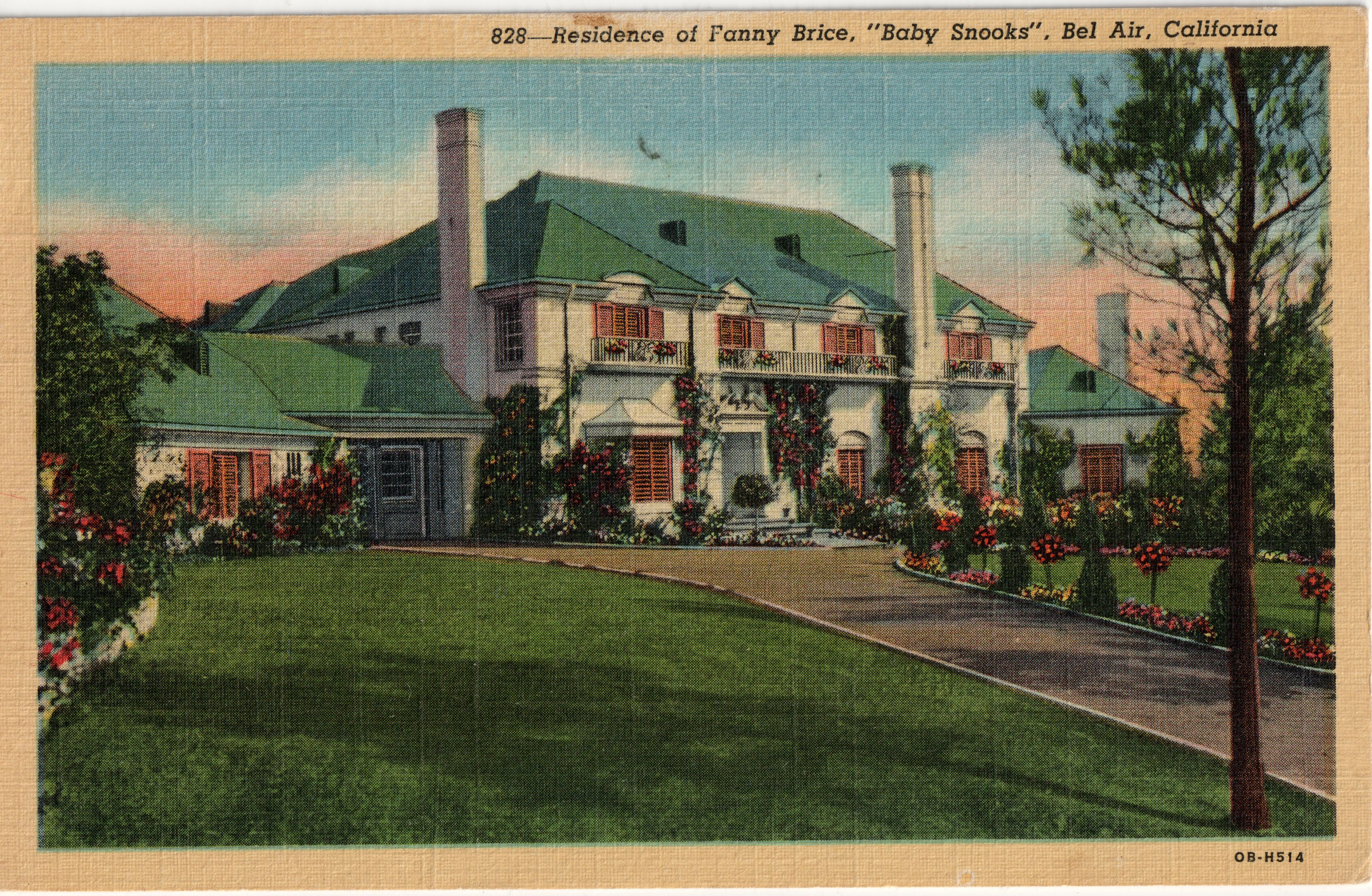
Residence of Fanny Brice in Bel Air California

== Death ==
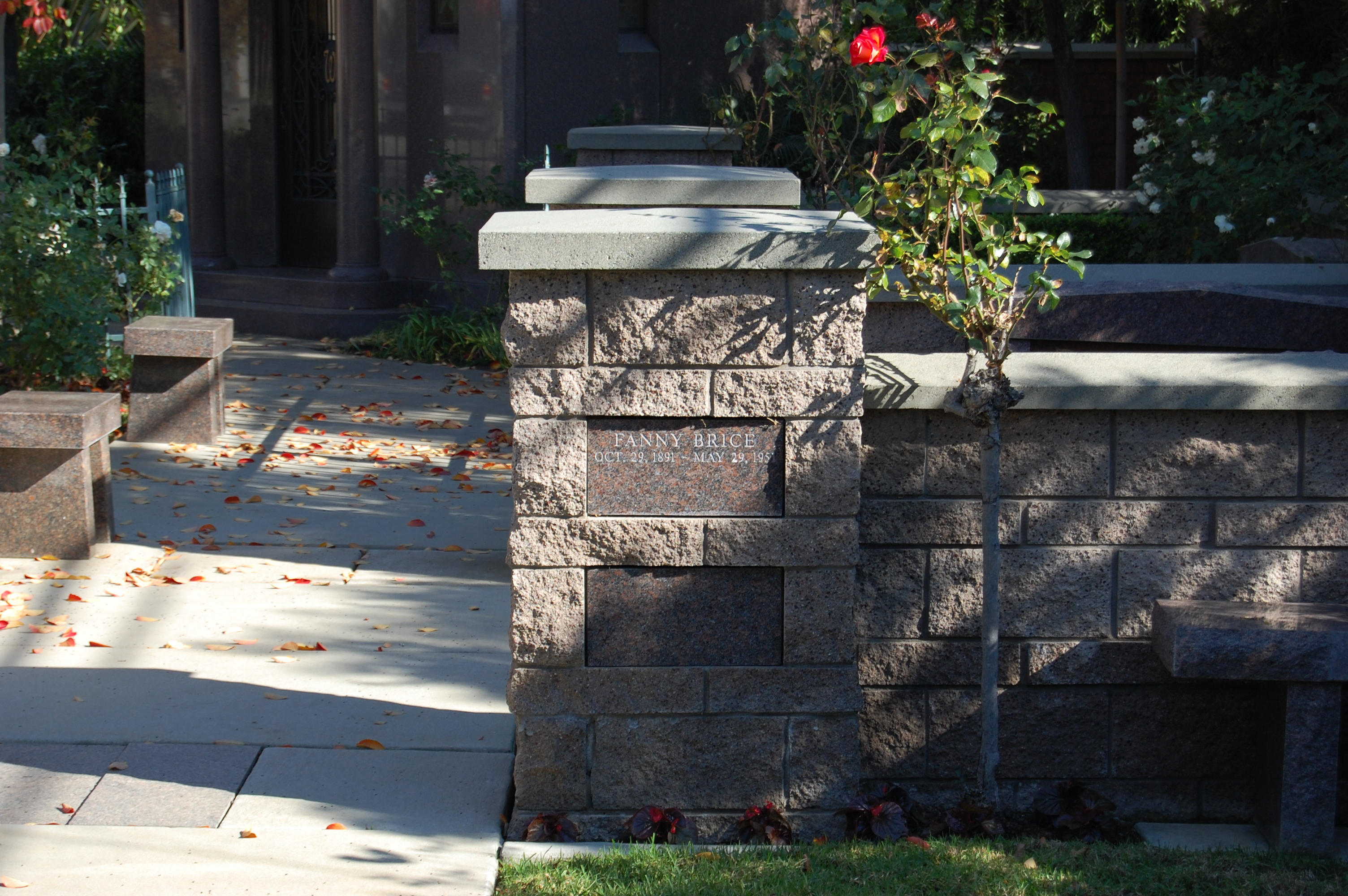
Brice's grave

Six months after her Big Show appearance, on May 29, 1951, Brice died at the Cedars of Lebanon Hospital in Hollywood from a cerebral hemorrhage at 11:15 am; she was 59. She was cremated, her ashes inurned at Home of Peace Memorial Park but in 1999 her remains were relocated to Westwood Village Memorial Park.

== Legacy ==
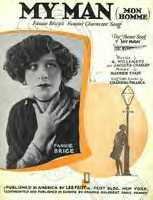
Cover of sheet music for Brice's 1921 "My Man"

For her contributions to the film and radio industries, Brice was posthumously inducted into the Hollywood Walk of Fame with two stars. Her motion-pictures star is located at 6415 Hollywood Boulevard, while her radio star is located at 1500 Vine Street.

The Stony Brook campus of the State University of New York (SUNY at Stony Brook) had a Fannie Brice Theatre, a 75-seat venue that was used for a variety of performances, including a 1992 production of the musical Hair, staged readings, and a studio classroom space.

Mexican comedian Maria Elena Saldana was influenced by Brice and created a character similar to Brice's Baby Snooks, La Guereja.

In 1991, the US Postal Service featured Brice on a first-class stamp, the only woman included as part of a "Comedian Commemorative Issue", illustrated by Al Hirschfeld.

In 2006, Brice was featured in the film Making Trouble-Three Generations of Funny Jewish Women, a tribute to Jewish women comedians produced by the Jewish Women's Archive.

"Fanny's", the restaurant in the Academy Museum in Los Angeles is named after Fanny Brice.

=== Brice portrayals ===
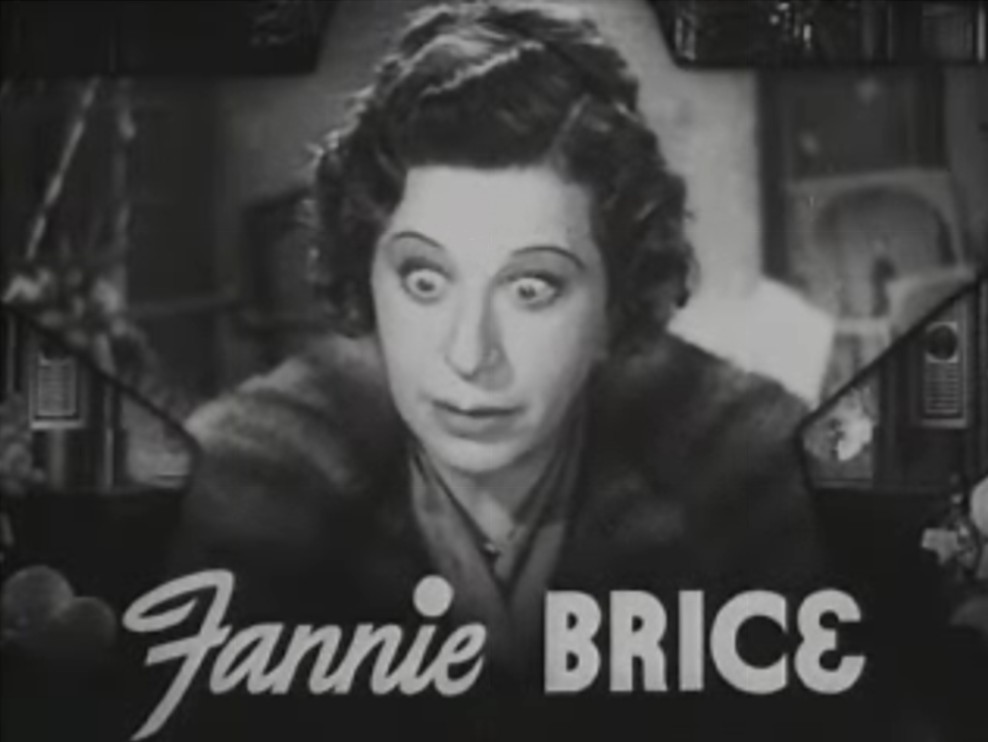
From the trailer for the film The Great Ziegfeld (1936) in which Brice appeared as herself

The 1946 Warner Bros. cartoon Quentin Quail features a character based on Brice's characterization of Baby Snooks.

Barbra Streisand starred as Brice in the 1964 Broadway musical Funny Girl, which centered on Brice's rise to fame and troubled relationship with Arnstein. In 1969, Streisand won an Academy Award for Best Actress for reprising her role in the film version. The 1975 film sequel, Funny Lady, focused on Brice's turbulent relationship with impresario Billy Rose and was as highly fictionalized as the original film. Streisand also recorded the Brice songs "My Man" and "I'd Rather Be Blue Over You (Than Happy with Somebody Else)"; and "Second Hand Rose", which reached Billboard's top 40.

Funny Girl, and its sequel Funny Lady, took liberties with the events of Brice's life. They make no mention of Brice's first husband and suggest that Arnstein turned to crime because his pride would not allow him to live off Fanny and that he was wanted by the police for selling phony bonds. In reality, however, Arnstein sponged off Brice even before their marriage, and was eventually named as a member of a gang that stole $5 million worth of Wall Street securities. Instead of turning himself in, as in the movie, Arnstein went into hiding. When he finally surrendered, he did not plead guilty as he did in the movie, but fought the charges, taking a toll on his wife's finances.

Beanie Feldstein starred as Brice in the Broadway revival of Funny Girl, which opened in April 2022. Lea Michele replaced Feldstein on September 6, 2022.

Though an actress does not portray Brice, her name is mentioned in three scenes of a movie that was successful at the box office and merited two Academy Award nominations: Can You Ever Forgive Me? (2018). The protagonist, Lee Israel, portrayed by Melissa McCarthy, is a biographer who hopes she can get paid to work on a project about Brice's life. Her literary agent Marjorie, portrayed by Jane Curtin, tells her sharply that that is not going to happen. Marjorie shouts at Lee, "Nobody wants a book about Fanny Brice! There is nothing new or sexy about Fanny Brice! I couldn't get you a ten-dollar advance for a book about Fanny Brice."

Kimberly Faye Greenberg originated the role of Fanny Brice in "One Night With Fanny Brice" Off-Broadway at St. Luke's Theatre, NYC (2011). Greenberg has also played Brice in three other shows. These portrayals of Fanny Brice include "Speakeasy Dollhouse: Ziegfeld Midnight Frolic" at Broadway's Liberty Theatre, NY (2015);

Other recent portrayals of Fanny Brice were in "Ghostlight" at the New York Musical Theatre Festival at the Signature Theatre, NYC (2011); and in the solo show "Fabulous Fanny: The Songs & Stories of Fanny Brice", which has been touring the United States since 2014 and is streaming on the Stellar Platform.

== See also ==
- Blanche Merrill
- List of songs written by Blanche Merrill
- Academy of Music/Riviera Theatre
