= My Man (1928 film) =

1928 film

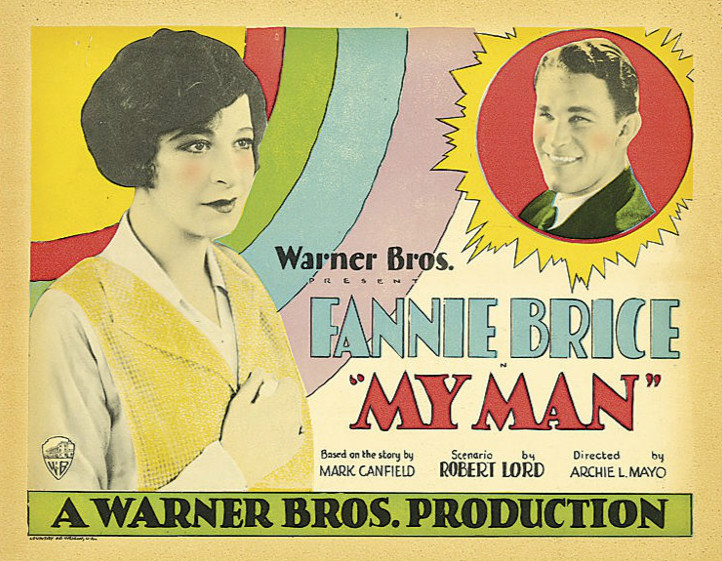
- Lobby card
- Directed by: Archie Mayo
- Written by: Robert Lord (scenario); Joseph Jackson (dialogue & titles); James A. Starr (titles)
- Story by: Mark Canfield (Darryl F. Zanuck)
- Produced by: Edward Small
- Starring: Fanny Brice
- Cinematography: Frank Kesson
- Edited by: Owen Marks
- Production company: Warner Bros. Pictures
- Distributed by: Warner Bros. Pictures
- Release date: December 15, 1928 (U.S.)
- Running time: 99 minutes
- Country: United States
- Languages: Sound (Part-Talkie); English intertitles
- Budget: $192,000
- Box office: $1,218,000

My Man is a 1928 black and white sound part-talkie American comedy-drama musical film directed by Archie Mayo starring Fanny Brice and featuring Guinn "Big Boy" Williams. In addition to sequences with audible dialogue or talking sequences, the film features a synchronized musical score and sound effects along with English intertitles. According to the film review in Variety, 62 minutes of the total running time of 99 minutes featured dialogue. The soundtrack was recorded using the Vitaphone sound-on-disc system.

This film was Brice's feature film debut at the age of 37. She was a star in the Ziegfeld Follies before she started acting in motion pictures. Warner Bros. Pictures had completely stopped making silent movies by 1928, and had switched exclusively to sound pictures by the end of the year, producing synchronized, part-talkies or full all-talking pictures. In 1929, Warner Bros. led the way in making sound movies in color.

== Plot ==
Fannie Brand, a spirited and talented girl from the tenements, works long hours in a factory to support herself and her little brother, Sammy. Her big break seems within reach when Landau, a director working for Broadway producer Waldo, arranges a tryout for her. But the audition is disrupted by the arrival of a glamorous woman whom Landau calls "Waldo's woman". To Fannie's shock, the woman is her long-absent sister Edna, who has been living away from home—and evidently not by respectable means. The emotional blow causes Fannie to falter, and Waldo writes her off as a one-number sensation. (Jealous sister thwarts Fannie's first big break)

Heartbroken, Fannie meets Joe Halsey, an unemployed but charming department store window decorator. She offers him shelter in her modest apartment, and as they grow closer, Fannie experiences love for the first time. After a mild spat and a reconciliation, Joe makes an offhand comment that Fannie takes as a proposal. For a time, she lives blissfully in the belief that marriage is on the horizon. (Tragi-comedy of a tenement girl's rise to Broadway fame)

But Edna returns, boasting that she's just ended her latest affair. She quickly catches Joe's eye, and despite his feelings for Fannie, Joe is drawn to Edna's beauty and sophistication. On what was to be Fannie's wedding night, she catches Joe in Edna's arms. (Fannie finds Joe in Edna's arms—moments before she's to marry him) Devastated but determined to hide her heartbreak, she joins the waiting guests and performs the song "My Man" with such raw emotion that Landau, impressed and moved, vows to take her back to Waldo. (Bride jilted on her wedding night finds strength in performance; Heartbreak becomes inspiration for showstopping rendition of "My Man")

A year later, Fannie—now a Broadway sensation thanks to Landau's guidance—has carved out a name for herself in the glittering world of show business. (From squalid slums to dazzling footlights; Sensational success in a second Broadway "break") Joe, having discovered Edna's shallowness, finally realizes the depth of Fannie's love and character. But it is too late. Fannie, while still singing "My Man", has moved on. She loses her lover but lives in memory of her "man". Her dreams now center on her brother Sammy's future, not on lost love.

== Cast ==
- Fanny Brice as Fannie Brand (credited as Fannie Brice)
- Guinn "Big Boy" Williams as Joe Halsey
- Edna Murphy as Edna Brand
- Andrés De Segurola as Landau
- Richard Tucker as Waldo
- Billy Seay as Sammy
- Arthur Hoyt as Thorne
- Ann Brody as Mrs. Schultz
- Clarissa Selwynne as Forelady

== Reception ==
According to Warner Bros. records, the film earned $1,099,000 in the U.S. and $119,000 elsewhere.

== Songs ==
- "I'd Rather Be Blue Over You" – Fred Fisher and Billy Rose
- "My Man" – music by Maurice Yvain, lyrics by Channing Pollock
- "Second Hand Rose" – music by James F. Hanley, lyrics by Grant Clarke
- "If You Want the Rainbow, You Must Have the Rain" – music by Oscar Levant, lyrics by Mort Dixon and Billy Rose
- "I'm an Indian" – music by Leo Edwards, lyrics by Blanche Merrill
- "I Was a Florodora Baby" – music by Harry Carroll, lyrics by Ballard MacDonald

All songs sung by Fanny Brice.

== Premiere Vitaphone short subjects ==
My Man premiered at the Warners' Theatre in Manhattan on December 21, 1928.

Title	Year
Val Harris and Ann Howe in "The Wild Westerner"	1928
Irene Franklin, the American Comedienne, with Jerry Jarnagin (piano)	1928
Ann Codee and Frank Orth in "Zwei and Furtzich"	1928

== Film preservation ==
An incomplete version of this film reportedly survives. In addition to this incomplete copy, the full synchronized soundtrack survives on Vitaphone discs, as well as the soundtrack for the theatrical trailer.

== See also ==
- List of lost films
- List of early sound feature films (1926–1929)
- List of early Warner Bros. talking features
