= My Boy Jack =

My Boy Jack may refer to:

- My Boy Jack (poem), a poem by Rudyard Kipling
- My Boy Jack (play), a play by David Haig, based on the poem
- My Boy Jack (film), a 2007 film based on the play
