= My Wife and I =

My Wife and I may refer to:

- My Wife & I, a 2017 Nigerian comedy family film
- My Wife and I (film), a 1925 American drama film
- My Wife and I: Or, Harry Henderson's History, an 1871 book by Harriet Beecher Stowe
- My Wife and I (TV series), a 1958 British sitcom
