= Live at Blossom =

Video by Donnie Iris and the Cruisers
- Released: 1981, re-released 2006
- Recorded: 1981
- Genre: Rock, Music Video
- Length: 51 minutes

Donnie Iris and the Cruisers chronology
Live at Blossom (1981)	King Cool: Ah! History of Donnie Iris and the Cruisers (2004)

Live at Blossom is the first live concert video by Donnie Iris, recorded and originally released in 1981. The concert was recorded at Blossom Music Center, when the band opened for the Michael Stanley Band.

== Track listing ==
1. "Agnes"
2. "That's The Way Love Ought To Be"
3. "King Cool"
4. "Sweet Merilee"
5. "I Can't Hear You"
6. "Broken Promises"
7. "Love Is Like a Rock"
8. "Ah! Leah!"

== Personnel ==
- Donnie Iris - lead vocals, rhythm guitars
- Mark Avsec - keyboards, background vocals
- Marty Lee Hoenes - guitars, background vocals
- Albritton McClain - bass, background vocals
- Kevin Valentine - drums

== Re-release ==
To celebrate the 25th anniversary of the concert, Live at Blossom was finally released onto DVD in 2006. It contained the same track listing as above, plus the music video for the band's new song Little Black Dress (from the Ellwood City album).

== Formats available ==
- VHS
- DVD
