= Ah! Live! =

Live album by Donnie Iris and the Cruisers
- Released: May 24, 2009
- Recorded: 2008
- Venue: Erie and Kittanning, Pennsylvania (live tracks)
- Studio: Mars Recording Studio, Mantua, Ohio ("Your Touch")
- Genre: Rock
- Length: 1:06:20
- Label: Primary
- Producer: Mark Avsec

Donnie Iris and the Cruisers chronology
You Can't Really Miss Me If I Never Go Away (2008)	Ah! Live! (2009)	Ah! Leluiah! (2010)

Ah! Live! is the second live album by American rock singer Donnie Iris, released in 2009. Except for one studio recording, all of the songs were recorded at live concerts in Kittanning and Erie, Pennsylvania. The album's name comes from Donnie's first hit single, "Ah! Leah!" It is his fifteenth solo album.

== Track listing ==
1. "Your Touch" (Auerbach, Carney)
2. "Little Black Dress" (Avsec)
3. "Soul Man" (Porter, Hayes)
4. "Sweet Merilee" (Avsec, Iris)
5. "King Cool" (Avsec, Iris)
6. "I Can't Hear You (Avsec, Iris, McClain, Hoenes, Valentine)
7. "Rocque Fantastique" (Avsec)
8. "I Can't Really Miss You (If You Never Go Away)" (Avsec)
9. "Love Is Like a Rock" (Avsec, Iris, McClain, Hoenes, Valentine)
10. "Ah! Leah!" (Avsec, Iris)
11. "The Rapper" (Iris)
12. "Hush" (South)

== Personnel ==
- Donnie Iris – lead vocals
- Mark Avsec – keyboards and background vocals
- Marty Lee Hoenes – guitar and background vocals
- Paul Goll – bass guitar and background vocals
- Kevin Valentine – drums
- Albritton McClain – bass guitar and background vocals (track 1)

== Production ==
- Mark Avsec – producer
- Rick Witowski – co-producer
- Donnie Iris – co-producer
