= Out of the Blue (Donnie Iris album) =

Studio album by Donnie Iris and the Cruisers
- Released: 1992
- Genre: Rock
- Label: Seathru
- Producer: Mark Avsec

Donnie Iris and the Cruisers chronology
No Muss...No Fuss (1985)	Out of the Blue (1992)	Footsoldier in the Moonlight (1993)

Out of the Blue is the sixth album by American rock singer Donnie Iris, released in 1992. The album is partly a 'best-of' collection as it consists of seven previously released tracks and six new songs ("Love Whispers," "On Our Way to Paradise," "Be Still My Heart," "Stray Cat," "The Mad Siberian" and "Temptation"). These six tracks were originally recorded for the band's unreleased 1986 album Cruise Control, and were remixed for this release.

The release of Out of the Blue was mainly the result of Donnie Iris and the Cruisers' back catalogue being unavailable on CD. Over the years between 1986 and 1992, Iris' management company, Belkin Management, were approached on a number of occasions by radio stations requesting some material on CD format, but Belkin were unable to provide anything. The band attempted to persuade MCA to release a compilation album, but their former label did not believe there was big enough demand for their back catalogue. For Out of the Blue, a deal was negotiated with MCA for permission to include "Ah! Leah!", "That's The Way Love Ought to Be" and "Love Is Like a Rock", but the licensing of further tracks was found to be cost prohibitive. Iris and his band owned the rights to most of the remaining tracks used.

== Critical reception ==
Professional ratings
Review scores
Source	Rating
AllMusic	4/5 stars
Kerrang!	4/5 stars

Dave Reynolds of the UK magazine Kerrang! called Out of the Blue a "collection of oddments from the great songsmith Donnie Iris and long-time sidekick Mark Avsec" and an LP that "any fan of the man will want to add to their collection". Bret Adams of AllMusic commented that Iris had "deserved to be a star based on the quality of [his] infectious power pop" in the 1980s. He noted the inclusion of some of the band's previous hits, as well as the "superb" "That's the Way Love Ought to Be" which "features Iris' unbelievable falsetto wail", but regretted others like "Tough World" and "Do You Compute?" were missing. Of the six new songs, he picked "Love Whispers" as the "most notabl[e]".

== Track listing ==
1. "Ah! Leah!" (Avsec, Iris) – 3:44
2. "Love Whispers" (Avsec, Iris, Lee) – 3:22
3. "That's The Way Love Ought to Be" (Avsec, Iris) – 4:17
4. "Injured in the Game of Love" (Avsec, Iris) – 3:24
5. "On Our Way to Paradise" (Avsec, Iris, Lee) – 5:05
6. "Be Still My Heart" (Avsec, Iris) – 3:39
7. "10th Street" (Avsec, Iris) – 3:41
8. "Stray Cat" (Avsec, Iris, Lee) – 3:49
9. "The Mad Siberian" (Avsec, Iris, Lee) – 3:33
10. "Ridin' Thunder" (Avsec, Iris, Lee) – 3:56
11. "Temptation" (Avsec, Iris, Lee) – 3:44
12. "Love Is Like a Rock" (Avsec, Iris, Lee, McClain, Valentine) – 3:34
13. "I Want You Back" (Avsec, Iris) – 3:27

== Personnel ==
- Donnie Iris - lead and background vocals, guitar
- Mark Avsec - keyboards, harmonica and background vocals
- Marty Lee Hoenes - guitars and background vocals
- Albritton McClain - bass guitar and background vocals (tracks 1, 3, 4, 7, 10, 12 and 13)
- Kevin Valentine - drums and percussion (tracks 1, 3, 4, 7, 10, 12 and 13)
- Scott Alan Williamson - bass guitar and background vocals (tracks 2, 5, 6, 8, 9 and 11)
- Tommy Rich - drums and percussion (tracks 2, 5, 6, 8, 9 and 11)

== Production ==
- Mastering: Rick Essig
- Producer: Mark Avsec
