= No Muss...No Fuss =

Studio album by Donnie Iris and the Cruisers
- Released: 1985
- Recorded: 1984 at Beachwood Studios in Beachwood, Ohio
- Genre: Rock
- Label: HME
- Producer: Mark Avsec

Donnie Iris and the Cruisers chronology
Fortune 410 (1983)	No Muss...No Fuss (1985)	Out of the Blue (1992)

Singles from No Muss...No Fuss
- 1. "Injured in the Game of Love" Released: January 1985; 2. "State of the Heart" Released: April 1985

No Muss...No Fuss is the fifth studio album by American rock singer Donnie Iris, released by HME in 1985.

== Background ==
Between 1980 and 1984, Iris had released four studio albums, three of which were released through MCA Records and generated a string of moderate and minor hit singles, including the top 30 tracks "Ah! Leah!" (1981) and "My Girl" (1982). After the limited success of Fortune 410, Iris departed MCA in 1984 and signed with the independent label HME Records. In the aftermath of mainstream indifference and legal tangles with MCA, Iris released No Muss...No Fuss in 1985 through their new label. The album peaked at number 115 on the Billboard 200, while the lead single, "Injured in the Game of Love", reached number 91 on the Billboard Hot 100. "State of the Heart" was issued as the album's second single, but failed to chart.

Iris did not release any further material until the 1992 album Out of the Blue. Just prior to the release of No Muss...No Fuss, the band split into different directions. Drummer Kevin Valentine and bassist Albritton McClain left to join a new group, The Innocent, and were replaced by Scott Alan Williamson on bass and Tommy Rich on drums. That same year, keyboardist Mark Avsec released a solo project under the moniker Cellarful of Noise. Even after releasing the eponymous debut album that same year, Avsec and Iris maintained that Donnie Iris and the Cruisers was still their main focus, and that they wanted to continue to release new albums with the band and its new line-up. The band returned to the studio in 1986 and recorded a new album titled Cruise Control; however, a lawsuit with the band's former label MCA resulted in the shelving of that album. It remained unreleased when the HME label went out of business, leaving Iris as an unsigned act.

In a 2008 interview with Iris, he revealed: "We had run into legal troubles with MCA. We ended up going to court over it. Actually, nothing really came of it, nobody won or lost anything, but we did lose time because I couldn't go into the studio to do any recording until that one was settled. Once it was done we were able to start recording again. That took a couple of years."

== Release ==
The album was released in America only via HME Records, on vinyl and cassette. It soon became out-of-print, and was later digitally remastered and re-issued on CD via Primary Recordings with an alternate cover on March 20, 1999. However this was a limited CD run, released through Iris' website, and soon became a collector's item. It was digitally remastered for CD by Francisco Rodriguez at Digital Dynamics Audio Inc.

In 1992 Iris and his band released the album Out of the Blue via the Seathru label, which contained seven previously released tracks and six new songs. Of the seven previously released tracks, four were taken from the No Muss...No Fuss album; "Injured in the Game of Love", "10th Street", "Ridin' Thunder" and "I Want You Back". The appearance of these tracks was partly due to MCA demanding too much money to license many of the band's other songs.

== Critical reception ==
Professional ratings
Review scores
Source	Rating
AllMusic	4/5 stars
Kerrang!	4/5 stars

Upon its release, Cash Box called No Muss...No Fuss a "tremendous effort from Iris which could break his career wide open". Billboard described the band's style as "ebullient power pop" and added, "As with earlier albums, the main suit is urgent but good-humored, melodic rock." Pete Bishop of The Pittsburgh Press described it as a "well-produced and well-performed LP". Scott Benarde of the Fort Lauderdale News wrote: "Iris' appeal lies in his ability to update the Phil Spector 'wall of sound,' infuse emotion into songs laden with synthesizers and anchor them with infectious dance rhythms. For added appeal, electric guitars and wailing vocals fly unencumbered across the techno-pop base. This is a good party or aerobic exercise record."

Derek Oliver of Kerrang! praised it as Iris' "best LP yet" and considered it a "move back into the mainstream arena of big, big production and tough, no-nonsense raunchy guitar-powered rock" after the reliance on "modern technology" on the previous album, Fortune 410. In a retrospective review, Bret Adams of AllMusic described it as "a killer record full of absurdly high-quality arena rock and power pop" and noted that "Iris' stunning vocals and the clean, melodic instrumental hooks of the band remain amazingly consistent".

== Track listing ==
=== Side one ===
1. "Injured in the Game of Love" (Avsec, Iris) – 3:26
2. "10th Street" (Avsec, Iris) – 3:42
3. "Ridin' Thunder" (Avsec, Iris) – 3:58
4. "You're My Serenity" (Avsec, Iris) – 3:38
5. "L.O.V.E." (Avsec, Iris) – 3:13

=== Side two ===
1. "Follow That Car" (Avsec, Iris) – 3:54
2. "Don't Cry Baby" (Gary Jones) – 3:25
3. "State of the Heart" (Avsec, Iris) – 3:57
4. "Headed for a Breakdown" (Avsec, Iris) – 3:22
5. "I Want You Back" (Avsec, Iris) – 3:34

== Charts ==
Chart (1985)	Peak position
US Billboard 200	115
US AOR Albums (Radio & Records)	23

=== Singles ===
Chart (1985)	Peak position
US Billboard Hot 100	91
US Billboard Top Rock Tracks	28

== Personnel ==
Donnie Iris and the Cruisers

- Donnie Iris - lead and background vocals, guitar
- Mark Avsec - keyboards, harmonica, background vocals
- Marty Lee Hoenes - rhythm and lead guitars, background vocals
- Albritton McClain - bass guitar, background vocals
- Kevin Valentine - drums, percussion

Additional musicians

- Dan McCarthy - horns on "Follow that Car"
- Rodney Psyka - percussion on "L.O.V.E."

Production

- Mark Avsec - producer (for Belkin-Maduri Organization)
- Carl Maduri - executive producer, recording and mixing engineer
- George Marino - mastering
- Marcia Resnick - cover photography
- Donna Scott (Modern Impressions Inc., Eastlake, Ohio) - jacket design
- Belkin Personal Management - management

=== CD re-issue personnel ===
- Marty Lee Hoenes - CD package design
- Francisco Rodriguez - digital remastering for CD
- Joe Woronka - stage manager
- Sue Farris - assistant, lyric transcriber
