= Live! At Nick's Fat City =

Live album by Donnie Iris and the Cruisers
- Released: 1998
- Recorded: September 12 and 13, 1997; Nick's Fat City, Pittsburgh, PA
- Genre: Rock
- Label: Primary
- Producer: Mark Avsec

Donnie Iris and the Cruisers chronology
Poletown (1997)	Live! At Nick's Fat City (1998)	Together Alone (1999)

Professional ratings
Review scores
Source	Rating
Allmusic	2.5/5 stars

Live! At Nick's Fat City is the first live album by American rock singer Donnie Iris, released in 1998. Nick's Fat City was a nightclub that was located in Pittsburgh in the South Side Flats neighborhood.

== Track listing ==
1. "Agnes" (Avsec, Iris) - 6:05
2. "Do You Compute?" (Avsec, Iris) - 4:52
3. "10th Street" (Avsec, Iris) - 4:09
4. "Tough World" (Avsec, Iris, Hoenes) - 5:29
5. "I Can't Hear You" (Avsec, Iris, McClain, Hoenes, Valentine) - 3:45
6. "That's the Way Love Ought to Be" (Avsec, Iris) - 4:52
7. "Poletown" (Avsec) - 6:06
8. "This Time it Must Be Love" (Avsec, Iris, Hoenes) - 4:39
9. "Injured in the Game of Love" (Avsec, Iris) - 8:43
10. "Minnie the Moocher" (Calloway, Mills, Gaskill) - 6:14
11. "Love Is Like a Rock" (Avsec, Iris, Hoenes, McClain, Valentine) - 6:39
12. "Ah! Leah!" (Avsec, Iris) - 7:06
13. "The Rapper" (Iris) - 5:15

== Personnel ==
- Donnie Iris - vocals
- Mark Avsec - organ, accordion, synths, piano, vocals
- Marty Hoenes - guitar and vocals
- Paul Goll - bass guitar and vocals
- Tommy Rich - drums

== Production ==
- Mark Avsec - Producer
- Rick Witkowski - Co-producer
