= Fortune 410 =

Studio album by Donnie Iris and the Cruisers
- Released: June 1983
- Recorded: 1983 at Recording Connection in Cleveland, OH
- Genre: Power pop
- Label: MCA
- Producer: Mark Avsec

Donnie Iris and the Cruisers chronology
The High and the Mighty (1982)	Fortune 410 (1983)	No Muss...No Fuss (1985)

Singles from Fortune 410
- 1. "Do You Compute?" Released: July 1983

Professional ratings
Review scores
Source	Rating
AllMusic	4/5 stars

Fortune 410 is the fourth album by American rock singer Donnie Iris, released in 1983. (The album title refers to the style of eyeglasses worn by Iris.) The album was reissued in remastered form on CD in 2021 by Rock Candy Records with a live bonus track from the 1981 Live EP.

== Critical reception ==
Upon its release, Billboard stated: "Iris and his Cruisers can be relied upon to deliver tough yet melodic pop/rock laced with welcome humor, a skill that remains well-honed on the basis of this latest outing." Cash Box called it an album that sees "Iris still churning out furious rock 'n' roll laced with the potent hooks he's known for", but with the addition of a "few DOR techno-ditties that even the loyal fans should enjoy".

In a 1989 feature on 10 "all-time overlooked AOR albums", Derek Oliver of the UK magazine Mega Metal Kerrang! included Fortune 410, calling it Iris's "finest hour", with each song an "extraordinary example of Iris's utter obsession with hooklines and carefully layered melody". He wrote: "With this record he successfully fused his penchant for off-the-wall madness and his unrivalled knack for penning sizzling unpretentious power pop. His vocal contributions are unparalleled and his range unbelievable. Like a convincing character actor, Iris locked himself into the lyrics as if he were telling a real life story."

== Track listing ==
=== Side one ===
1. "Human Evolution" (Avsec, Iris, Lee, McClain, Valentine) - 3:10
2. "Stagedoor Johnny" (Avsec, Lee, Iris) - 3:45
3. "Cry If You Want To" (Avsec, Iris) - 3:12
4. "Tell Me What You Want" (Avsec, Lee, Iris) - 3:20
5. "I Belong" (Avsec) - 4:57

=== Side two ===
1. "She's So European" (Avsec, Iris) - 3:24
2. "I'm a User" (Avsec, Iris) - 2:36
3. "Never Did I" (McClain) - 3:56
4. "Somebody" (Avsec, Iris) - 3:50
5. "Do You Compute?" (Avsec, Iris) - 3:40

=== 2021 remastered CD reissue ===
1. "Human Evolution" - 3:15
2. "Stagedoor Johnny" - 3:48
3. "Cry If You Want To" - 3:14
4. "Tell Me What You Want" - 3:21
5. "I Belong" - 5:00
6. "She's So European" - 3:25
7. "I'm a User" - 2:38
8. "Never Did I" - 3:58
9. "Somebody" - 3:52
10. "Do You Compute?" - 3:43
11. "The Rapper (Live)" - 3:44

== Personnel ==
=== Donnie Iris and the Cruisers ===
- Donnie Iris - lead and background vocals
- Mark Avsec - piano, organ, synthesizers, background vocals
- Marty Lee Hoenes - guitars and background vocals
- Albritton McClain - bass guitar and background vocals
- Kevin Valentine - drums and percussion

=== Additional musicians ===
- Rick Bell, saxophone
- Dan McCarthy, trumpet

== Production ==
- Executive Producer: Carl Maduri & Chris Maduri
- Producer: Mark Avsec
- Engineer: Carl Maduri III

== Charts ==
Chart (1983)	Peak position
US Top LPs & Tape (Billboard)	127
US Rock Albums (Billboard)	17
US Top Albums (Cash Box)	143
US AOR Albums (Radio & Records)	17

Singles - Billboard (United States)

Year	Single	Chart	Position
1983	"Do You Compute?"	Billboard Hot 100	64
1983	"Do You Compute?"	Top Rock Tracks	20
