= Back on the Streets (Donnie Iris album) =

Studio album by Donnie Iris and the Cruisers
- Released: July 15, 1980
- Recorded: Spring 1980
- Studios: Jeree Studios, New Brighton, Pennsylvania
- Genre: Rock
- Label: Midwest National
- Producer: Mark Avsec

Donnie Iris and the Cruisers chronology
Back on the Streets (1980)	King Cool (1981)

Singles from Back on the Streets
- 1. "Ah! Leah!" Released: November 1980; 2. "You're Only Dreaming" Released: April 1981; 3. "I Can't Hear You" Released: 1981

Back on the Streets is the debut studio album by American rock singer/guitarist Donnie Iris, released in 1980. The single "Ah! Leah!" was a hit for Iris, reaching #29 on the U.S. Billboard Hot 100 chart and #19 on the U.S. Billboard Top Tracks chart. The album was remastered and reissued on CD in 2021 by Rock Candy Records with two live bonus tracks from the 1981 Live EP.

== Critical reception ==
Professional ratings
Review scores
Source	Rating
AllMusic	4/5 stars

Upon its release, Cash Box wrote: "Iris borrow[s] from several styles, but his sound is such a classic example of modern energized pop that one forgets the cops and just feels this refreshing and lovably quirky sound." Record World noted that Iris "juggles his unusual production techniques as well as his unusual motifs". In a retrospective review, Tom Demalon of AllMusic called the album a "blend of meat-and-potatoes rock and new wave, which succeeds due to its simple nature and some infectious hooks".

== Track listing ==
=== Side one ===
1. "Agnes" (Avsec, Ierace) – 3:30
2. "You're Only Dreaming" (Avsec, Ierace, McClain, Hoenes, Valentine) – 4:45
3. "She's So Wild" (Avsec, Ierace, McClain, Hoenes, Valentine) – 2:35
4. "Daddy Don't Live Here Anymore" (Avsec, Ierace) – 3:49
5. "Too Young to Love" (Avsec) – 5:31

=== Side two ===
1. "Ah! Leah!" (Mark Avsec, Dominic Ierace) – 3:46
2. "I Can't Hear You" (Avsec, Ierace, Albritton McClain, Marty Hoenes, Kevin Valentine) – 3:40
3. "Joking" (Avsec, Ierace) – 4:04
4. "Shock Treatment" (Avsec) – 3:48
5. "Back on the Streets" (Avsec, Ierace) – 3:36

Re-released October 1980 as MCA 3272 with sides one and two reversed.

=== 2021 remastered CD reissue ===
1. "Ah! Leah!" - 3:47
2. "I Can't Hear You" - 3:40
3. "Joking" - 4:05
4. "Shock Treatment" - 3:49
5. "Back on the Streets" - 3:38
6. "Agnes" - 3:30
7. "You're Only Dreaming" - 4:45
8. "She's So Wild" - 2:35
9. "Daddy Don't Live Here Anymore" - 3:50
10. "Too Young to Love" - 5:34
11. "Ah! Leah! (Live)" - 4:37
12. "I Can't Hear You (Live)" - 3:41

== Personnel ==
=== Donnie Iris and the Cruisers ===
- Donnie Iris - lead and background vocals
- Mark Avsec - piano, synthesizers, vocals
- Marty Lee Hoenes - acoustic and electric guitars
- Albritton McClain - bass guitar
- Kevin Valentine - drums

=== Additional musicians ===
- Kenny Blake - saxophone
- Robert Peckman - bass on "Shock Treatment"

== Production ==
- Executive Producer: Carl Maduri
- Producer: Mark Avsec
- Engineer: Jerry Reed

== Charts ==
Chart (1981)	Peak position
Australia (Kent Music Report)	44
US Top LPs & Tape (Billboard)	57
US Rock Albums (Billboard)	17
US Top 100 Albums (Cash Box)	58
US Album Airplay (Radio & Records)	12
US Albums (Record World)	67

Singles - Billboard

Year	Single	Chart	Position
1981	"Ah! Leah!"	Billboard Hot 100	29
1981	"Ah! Leah!"	Mainstream Rock Tracks	19
1981	"I Can't Hear You"	Mainstream Rock Tracks	47
