= The High and the Mighty (album) =

Studio album by Donnie Iris and the Cruisers
- Released: 1982
- Recorded: Summer 1982 at Jeree Studios in New Brighton, PA
- Genre: Power pop
- Label: MCA
- Producer: Mark Avsec

Donnie Iris and the Cruisers chronology
King Cool (1981)	The High and the Mighty (1982)	Fortune 410 (1983)

Singles from The High and the Mighty
- 1. "Tough World" Released: October 1982; 2. "The High and the Mighty" Released: 1982; 3. "This Time It Must Be Love" Released: January 1983

The High and the Mighty is the third album by American rock singer Donnie Iris, released in 1982. The album was reissued in remastered form on CD in 2021 by Rock Candy Records with a live bonus track from the 1981 Live EP.

== Critical reception ==
Professional ratings
Review scores
Source	Rating
AllMusic	3/5 stars
Reno Gazette-Journal	4/5 stars

Upon its release, Billboard wrote that The High and the Mighty "finds this band continuing its canny balancing act between melodic pop and hard-hitting rock". They noted that Iris "brings both romance and wit to the proceedings" and believed the album had "quick AOR and good crossover prospects". Cash Box praised it as "palatable and highly melodic pop" which is "heavy on hooks yet rarely traverses into simplistic bubblegum-type music".

Greg Allen, writing for The Press of Atlantic City, noted Iris had produced "some more quality cuts and potential AM radio winners", with Iris being "tops when it comes to hooks and harmonies". Patrick Thomas of the Reno Gazette-Journal praised the album as "spirited pop music" that is "upbeat and fun to listen to". He considered it to be "loaded with hooks right and left", with each song "follow[ing] the mode" of "Ah! Leah!".

In a retrospective review, Bret Adams of AllMusic considered The High and the Mighty to be "the lesser" of Iris's first four albums, but stated that it "maintains his high level of quality rock and power-pop" and is "still light years ahead of inferior but more popular albums from the 1980s".

== Track listing ==
=== Side one ===
1. "Tough World" (Avsec, Iris, Lee) – 3:48
2. "I Wanna Tell Her" (Avsec, Iris) – 4:18
3. "Glad All Over" (Clark) – 3:09
4. "Parallel Time" (Avsec, Iris) – 4:15

=== Side two ===
1. "The High and the Mighty" (Avsec, Iris, Lee, McClain, Valentine) – 4:08
2. "This Time It Must Be Love" (Avsec, Iris, Lee) – 4:19
3. "Love Is Magic" (McClain) – 3:59
4. "You're Gonna Miss Me" (Avsec, Iris) – 3:35

=== 2021 remastered CD reissue ===
1. "Tough World" – 3:51
2. "I Wanna Tell Her" – 4:22
3. "Glad All Over" – 3:11
4. "Parallel Time" – 4:18
5. "The High and the Mighty" – 4:11
6. "This Time It Must Be Love" – 4:20
7. "Love Is Magic" – 4:02
8. "You're Gonna Miss Me" – 3:37
9. "Agnes (Live)" – 4:37

== Personnel ==
- Donnie Iris - lead and background vocals
- Mark Avsec - piano, organ, synthesizers, background vocals
- Marty Lee Hoenes - guitars and background vocals
- Albritton McClain - bass guitar and background vocals
- Kevin Valentine - drums and percussives

== Production ==
- Executive Producer: Carl Maduri
- Producer: Mark Avsec
- Engineer: Jerry Reed

== Charts ==
Chart (1982)	Peak position
US Top LPs & Tape (Billboard)	180
US Top Albums (Cash Box)	129

=== Singles ===
Singles - Billboard (United States)

Year	Single	Chart	Position
1982	"Tough World"	Billboard Hot 100	57
1982	"Tough World"	Top Rock Tracks	26
1982	"The High and the Mighty"	Top Rock Tracks	39
