= Samantha (What You Gonna Do?) =

1988 song by Cellarful of Noise

Single by Cellarful of Noise

from the album Magnificent Obsession
- B-side: "Shuck and Jive"
- Released: 1988
- Length: 3:27
- Label: CBS
- Songwriter: Mark Avsec
- Producer: Mark Avsec

Cellarful of Noise singles chronology
"I'd Walk the Line" (1985)	"Samantha (What You Gonna Do?)" (1988)

"Samantha (What You Gonna Do?)" is a song by Cellarful of Noise, a solo project of the American keyboardist, songwriter, and producer Mark Avsec, with Donnie Iris on vocals. The song, written and produced by Avsec, was released in 1988 as the sole single from the second and final Cellarful of Noise album, Magnificent Obsession (1988). It reached number 69 on the US Billboard Hot 100 chart.

== Writing ==
"Samantha (What You Gonna Do?)" is about a teenage girl who has an unplanned pregnancy and is undecided on whether or not to keep her appointment for an abortion.

== Recording ==
While Mark Avsec had recorded all the vocals on his 1985 debut solo album, he enlisted Donnie Iris, his fellow bandmate from Donnie Iris and the Cruisers, on vocal duties for a number of tracks on the follow-up, Magnificent Obsession, including "Samantha". The song was written and recorded as a last minute addition to the album, six months after the rest of the tracks had been mastered.

== Release ==
Upon its release, "Samantha" generated encouraging airplay and sales with only limited promotion from the label, CBS Records. No music video was commissioned to promote the single and it was only available on 7-inch and not CD format. At the time, the label's focus was on another of their releases, "I Wish I Had a Girl" by Henry Lee Summer, which ultimately became a top 20 hit. By the end of March 1988, Avsec and Iris were informed by CBS that "Samantha" was now their top priority. Despite this, the single climbed no higher than number 69 on the Billboard Hot 100 in April 1988. Iris told The Pittsburgh Press in 1988: "As far as we're concerned, as long as [CBS] can pull it off and do a number on the record at this point with promoting it right and getting it on the radio, then we'll be satisfied. But if they lose it at this point, we won't be very happy. We will be very disappointed if the song doesn't hit."

== Critical reception ==
Upon its release, Billboard described "Samantha" as a "catchy technorock narrative from Avsec and rock veteran Donnie Iris". In a review of Magnificent Obsession, Brant Houston of the Hartford Courant described it as a "Prince-like" song that "serves up more than adequate mainstream dance and radio fare and is the best argument for a single". In a retrospective on Cellarful of Noise, Stephen Schnee, writing for AllMusic, praised it as "fabulous".

== Track listing ==
7–inch single (US)

1. "Samantha (What You Gonna Do?)" – 3:27
2. "Shuck and Jive" – 4:27

== Personnel ==
"Samantha (What You Gonna Do?)"

- Mark Avsec – all instruments except guitar
- Donnie Iris – lead vocals, background vocals
- Alan Greene – guitar

Production

- Mark Avsec – production, engineering, mixing
- Donnie Iris – mixing
- Jerry Reed – engineering (vocal tracks)
- James DeMain – engineering (guitar tracks)
- Joe Barbaria – digital transfer, mixing

== Charts ==
Chart (1988)	Peak position
US Billboard Hot 100	69
US Cash Box Top 100 Singles	76
