= Ah! Leluiah! =

Studio album by Donnie Iris and the Cruisers
- Released: November 18, 2010
- Recorded: Mars Recording Studio, Mantua, Ohio; 2010
- Genre: Rock; Christmas
- Length: 54:08
- Label: Primary
- Producer: Mark Avsec

Donnie Iris and the Cruisers chronology
Ah! Live! (2009)	Ah! Leluiah! (2010)

Ah! Leluiah! is the eleventh studio album and the first Christmas album by American rock singer Donnie Iris, released on November 18, 2010. The project was first announced by keyboardist/songwriter/producer/legalist Mark Avsec in February 2010 in an interview with Cleveland Scene. (The album title is a pun on Iris' big hit song, "Ah! Leah!".)

== Track listing ==
1. "Introduction"
2. "Angels We Have Heard on High"
3. "We Wish You a Merry Christmas"
4. "Blue Christmas"
5. "Emmanuel"
6. "O Come All Ye Faithful"
7. "White Christmas"
8. "Carol of the Bells"
9. "Alleluyah Sasa! (He Is Born)"
10. "This Child" (original song, written by Avsec)
11. "Ave Maria"
12. "We Wish You a Merry Christmas" (reprise)
13. "Panis angelicus"
14. "The Hallelujah Chorus"
15. "Auld Lang Syne"
16. "Have Yourself a Merry Little Christmas"
17. "Silent Night"

== Personnel ==
- Donnie Iris – lead vocals
- Mark Avsec – keyboards and vocals
- Marty Lee Hoenes – guitar and vocals
- Paul Goll – bass and vocals
- Kevin Valentine – drums
