= You Can't Really Miss Me If I Never Go Away =

EP by Donnie Iris and the Cruisers
- Released: December 13, 2008
- Genre: Rock
- Length: 27:01
- Label: Primary
- Producer: Mark Avsec

Donnie Iris and the Cruisers chronology
Ellwood City (2006)	You Can't Really Miss Me If I Never Go Away (2008)	Ah! Live! (2009)

You Can't Really Miss Me If I Never Go Away is the first EP by Donnie Iris, released in 2008.

== Track listing ==
1. "Hard Spot" (Avsec)
2. "I Can't Really Miss You (If You Never Go Away)" (Avsec)
3. "Ode to Jane (Immortal Beloved)" (Avsec)
4. "Screamin' Boy" demo (Avsec)
5. "The Twelve Dawnie Days of Christmas" live (Avsec)

== Personnel ==
- Donnie Iris - lead and background vocals
- Mark Avsec - keyboards
- Marty Lee Hoenes - guitars
- Alan Green - guitar (#4)
- Paul Goll - bass (#1)
- Albritton McClain - bass (#2 & 3)
- Kevin Valentine - drums (#2 & 3)
- Brice Foster - drums (#1)
- Tommy Rich - drums (#4)
