= Poletown (album) =

Studio album by Donnie Iris and the Cruisers
- Released: 1997
- Genre: Rock
- Length: 59:47
- Label: Seathru
- Producer: Mark Avsec

Donnie Iris and the Cruisers chronology
Footsoldier in the Moonlight (1993)	Poletown (1997)	Live! At Nick's Fat City (1998)

Poletown is the eighth studio album by American rock singer Donnie Iris, released in 1997. It was Iris' third post-major label release, and was released independently on Seathru Records.

== Background ==
Poletown marked the reforming of the original Donnie Iris and the Cruisers' line-up and was recorded at Jeree Recording Studio in New Brighton, Pennsylvania in 1994. Ten of the album's tracks were musically written by all members of the band, with Mark Avsec writing all lyrics. Poletown marked a dramatic departure from the band's previous work, with the songs being lyrically and musically dark and brooding. It was the last time that the band recorded with engineer Jerry Reed, who died in 1999.

Upon release, Poletown was largely ignored by radio, even from the band's long-time supporter WDVE. During 1997, Iris was also the recipient of the year's Lifetime Achievement Award. The song's title track tells the story of immigrants who build a small town, which later becomes devastated when the major employer leaves. The lyrics refer to General Motors workers in Michigan, though a photo of West Aliquippa was included within the album's booklet.

In a 1998 interview with bangSheet, Avsec revealed how the album materialized:

"The Poletown record was done right after I finished law school, and right before I started studying for the bar. It was sort of, well not really a last blast, but I knew I was going to get real busy. I had all these tunes, so we did the album. And, from my standpoint, I do still like to write, though it's not so much the co-writing it once was. It could be, like the Poletown record was musically. We just got the original guys together, and we pretty much went in there just jamming on all the tracks. That's why everyone is listed as a writer. Then, I pretty much wrote the lyrics and made songs out of them."

== Track listing ==
No.	Title	Writer(s)	Length
1.	"Poletown"	Mark Avsec, Dominic Ierace, Marty Lee Hoenes, Albritton McClain, Kevin Valentine	4:56
2.	"How You Gonna Mend It?"	Avsec, Ierace, Hoenes, McClain, Valentine	4:07
3.	"Valerie"	Avsec, Ierace, Hoenes, McClain, Valentine	5:52
4.	"I Am Your Eyes"	Avsec, Ierace, Hoenes, McClain, Valentine	4:29
5.	"The Stalker"	Avsec, Ierace, Hoenes, McClain, Valentine	5:16
6.	"Don't Want to Be a Hero"	Avsec, Ierace, Hoenes, McClain, Valentine	4:28
7.	"I Lie Down"	Avsec, Ierace, Hoenes, McClain, Valentine	4:39
8.	"Bitter Lemons"	Avsec, Ierace, Hoenes, McClain, Valentine	4:59
9.	"Hey Rembrandt"	Avsec	4:50
10.	"Scream"	Avsec	0:59
11.	"Within Me + Without You"	Avsec, Ierace, Hoenes, McClain, Valentine	5:58
12.	"Come, Come, Come"	Avsec, Ierace, Hoenes, McClain, Valentine	5:09
13.	"Cross the Rubicon"	Avsec	4:00

== Critical reception ==
Professional ratings
Review scores
Source	Rating
The Times/Beaver Newspapers, Pennsylvania	mixed
The Cleveland Free Times	favorable
bangSheet	favorable

Virginia Ross Lutz of The Times/Beaver Newspapers, Pennsylvania, wrote "This is one musical journey you might not want to miss, especially if you happen to be a Donnie Iris fan. The album carries us across 13 tracks and several decades with a little bit of groove, a little bit of pop and some classic and alternative rock. There are even a few touches of doo-wop and some punk threads thrown in. In addition to Avsec's doom-and-gloom look at "Poletown," the album sets a dark mood with "The Stalker" and "Bitter Lemons." Iris has a little fun with fallen love and hopeful recovery in "Within Me and Without You." Overall the work might come across as negative. But weaved with clever phrases, it effectively digs into and at times brings humor to life's little ironies. It offers an abundance of sin, lust, adultery, guilt, anger discouragement and cynicism. You can either listen and have some fun with it or really listen and get into some heavy thinking."

In the Cleveland Free Times, of September 2, 1998, writer Anastasia Pantsios noted "Poletown made a small stab at going the Springsteen route (or probably, more accurately, the Joe Grushecky route) and writing an album that approached social commentary about the disruption of the lives of working-class people. The title track dealt with a neighborhood in Detroit that was destroyed to make room for General Motors. Although such songs sound passionate and sincere, it's not what Iris' fans go to him for. They want to drink a couple of Friday night beers and forget that anything matters more than girls and rock and roll."

In Volume 1, Issue 8 of bangSheet, dated October 5, 1998, writer Feeway Cummings said: "An absolutely stunning batch of songs. The songwriting was mature and serious. The playing, loose, tight, loud, soft, and pure energy. And, of course, the voice. The voice is still the voice. Donnie adding the emotion and pure honesty of that voice. The album staggered me. These guys still have got it. They never lost it. They never lost me. The world which Louie, Agnes, Merilee and King Cool himself have grown into. Youthful days of love, passion, bars, cars, and late nights have given way to kids, divorce, wrinkles, affairs, class reunions, jobs and loves lost, and introspection. Change with redemption. Age with wisdom. Music that is classic, mature and timeless. A classic." Kurt V. Hernon of bangSheet also noted "The album was a superb return to form and was the logical progression of the Cruiser sound. It is a mature and brooding piece. The music, and Donnie, were as strong as ever. And the original Cruisers were back onboard. The themes are more serious, the music at times haunting."

== Personnel ==
- Donnie Iris - lead and background vocals, rhythm guitars
- Mark Avsec - keyboards, accordion, and background vocals
- Marty Lee Hoenes - lead, acoustic, and rhythm guitars
- Albritton McClain - bass guitar
- Kevin Valentine - drums

== Production ==
- Design: Marty Lee Hoenes
- Engineer: Jerry Reed
- Mixing: Kevin Valentine
- Producer: Mark Avsec
