= Ellwood City (album) =

Studio album by Donnie Iris and the Cruisers
- Released: May 25, 2006
- Recorded: 2003–2005
- Genre: Rock
- Length: 1:10:03
- Label: Primary
- Producer: Mark Avsec

Donnie Iris and the Cruisers chronology
25 Years (2004)	Ellwood City (2006)	You Can't Really Miss Me If I Never Go Away (2008)

Ellwood City is the tenth studio album by American rock singer Donnie Iris, released in 2006.

== Critical reception ==
Professional ratings
Review scores
Source	Rating
Pittsburgh Post-Gazette	3/5 stars

Upon its release, Scott Mervis of the Pittsburgh Post-Gazette noted the range of styles and influences on the album as it "jumps all over the map, sounding like Bowie one minute, the Beatles the next, then touching on U2, Bruce Springsteen, ELO, Nick Lowe and a lot more". He added that, while the album "falters in places", "sometimes taking chances on these widely varying influences works for Iris and Avsec" and the "common thread is that Iris loves a hard-driving rock song bolstered by a big clean wall of sound". Mervis also believed that classic rock radio "should definitely give 'Little Black Dress' or 'Soul Man' some spins".

== Track listing ==
1. "Little Black Dress" (Avsec, Goll, Hoenes, Ierace, Valentine)
2. "Soul Man" (David Porter, Isaac Hayes)
3. "Let's Go" (Avsec, Goll, Hoenes, Ierace, Valentine)
4. "River of Love" (Avsec)
5. "Just Go Tango" (Avsec, Goll, Hoenes, Ierace, Valentine)
6. "Rocque Fantastique" (Avsec, Goll, Hoenes, Ierace, Valentine)
7. "Ellwood City" (Avsec)
8. "Love Me with the Light On" (Avsec, Goll, Hoenes, Ierace, Foster)
9. "No Rest for the Wicked" (Avsec, Goll, Hoenes, Ierace, Valentine)
10. "Love Messiah" (Avsec, Goll, Hoenes, Ierace, Valentine)
11. "You Got My Body (You Don't Have My Soul)" (Avsec, Ierace, Valentine)
12. "Tuesday Morning" (Avsec)
13. "Love Me with the Light On" (Avsec, Iris, Hoenes, Goll, Foster)
14. "Just Go Tango" (extended mix) (Avsec)
15. "With This Ring" *Bonus Track
16. "Hard Spot" (Avsec) *Special Bonus Track

== Personnel ==
- Donnie Iris - lead and background vocals
- Mark Avsec - piano, organ, synthesizers, background vocals
- Marty Lee Hoenes - guitars, background vocals
- Paul Goll - bass, background vocals
- Kevin Valentine - drums, percussion
- Brice Foster - drums on tracks 4, 7, 8, and 13

== Production ==
- Mark Avsec - Producer
- Marty Lee Hoenes - Design
