= King Cool =

Studio album by Donnie Iris and the Cruisers
- Released: August 1981
- Recorded: Summer 1981 at Jeree Studios in New Brighton, PA
- Genre: Rock
- Label: MCA
- Producer: Mark Avsec

Donnie Iris and the Cruisers chronology
Back on the Streets (1980)	King Cool (1981)	The High and the Mighty (1982)

Singles from King Cool
- 1. "Sweet Merilee" Released: October 1981; 2. "Love Is Like a Rock" Released: December 1981; 3. "My Girl" Released: March 1982

King Cool is the second studio album by Donnie Iris, released in 1981. The album was reissued in remastered form on CD in 2021 by Rock Candy Records with a live bonus track from the 1981 Live EP.

== Critical reception ==
Professional ratings
Review scores
Source	Rating
AllMusic	4.5/5 stars

Upon its release, Billboard praised Iris as a "skilled popmaster" who "again balances sharp melodies and soaring group harmonies with tough rock momentum". They added that, like Styx and REO Speedwagon, "this band juggles rock anthems and modern romance adroitly". Cash Box wrote: "Iris scored one of the pop/rock sleepers of 1980 with Back on the Streets and the top 40 single, 'Ah! Leah!'. Iris and Avsec return with more of that wonderful multi-layered high harmony power pop, and they should fare even better than last year." Record World stated: "The man who enchanted the airwaves with 'Ah! Leah!' is back with a new girl named 'Sweet Merilee' and tales of rock 'n' roll heartbreak that will delight his fans. The Beatlish backing vocals of 'My Girl' and catchy tags like the title cut will put Iris and the Cruisers in the fast track."

In the UK, Howard Johnson of Kerrang! praised the album as a "collection of classy hard pop rockers which should see this band racing up the US charts with only their Cadillac tail lights in the distance". He added: "The basic fodder of King Cool is an irresistible melody in each number, aided by spotlessly clean harmonies, yet biting, bruising guitar play roughen[s] each song up somewhat and the whole venture is far more worthwhile for it." In a retrospective review, Tom Demalon of AllMusic called it "crunchy, singalong rock" and continued: "King Cool toned down some of the New Wave leanings of Back on the Streets and concentrated more on a classic rock sound yielded rewarding results."

== Track listing ==
=== Side one ===
1. "Sweet Merilee" (Avsec, Iris) - 3:37
2. "The Promise" (Lee) - 4:06
3. "Pretender" (Avsec, Iris) - 5:15
4. "Love Is Like a Rock" (Avsec, Iris, Lee, McClain, Valentine) - 3:35
5. "That's the Way Love Ought to Be" (Avsec, Iris) - 4:19

=== Side two ===
1. "My Girl" (Avsec, Iris) - 3:59
2. "Broken Promises" (Avsec, Iris) - 4:21
3. "King Cool" (Avsec, Iris) - 4:05
4. "Color Me Blue" (Avsec, Iris) - 5:19
5. "The Last to Know" (Avsec, Iris) - 5:19

=== 2021 remastered CD reissue ===
1. "Sweet Merilee" - 3:42
2. "The Promise" - 4:08
3. "Pretender" - 5:14
4. "Love Is Like a Rock" - 3:38
5. "That's the Way Love Ought to Be" - 4:23
6. "My Girl" - 4:00
7. "Broken Promises" - 4:19
8. "King Cool" - 4:07
9. "Color Me Blue" - 5:20
10. "The Last to Know" - 5:21
11. "Shock Treatment (Live)" - 4:44

== Personnel ==
=== Donnie Iris and the Cruisers ===
- Donnie Iris - lead and background vocals
- Mark Avsec - piano, organ, synthesizers, glockenspiel, background vocals
- Marty Lee Hoenes - guitars and background vocals
- Albritton McClain - bass guitar and background vocals
- Kevin Valentine - drums and percussion

=== Additional musicians ===
- Kenny Blake - saxophone

== Production ==
- Executive Producer: Carl Maduri
- Producer: Mark Avsec
- Engineer: Jerry Reed
- Mixed by Michael Barbiero at Mediasound Studios, New York

== Charts ==
Chart (1981)	Peak position
US Top LPs & Tape (Billboard)	84
US Top 100 Albums (Cash Box)	78
US AOR National Airplay (Radio & Records)	16
US Albums (Record World)	101

Singles - Billboard (United States)

Year	Single	Chart	Position
1981	"Sweet Merilee"	Billboard Hot 100	80
1981	"Sweet Merilee"	Top Rock Tracks	31
1982	"Love Is Like a Rock"	Billboard Hot 100	37
1982	"Love Is Like a Rock"	Top Rock Tracks	9
1982	"My Girl"	Billboard Hot 100	25
