= Poletown (disambiguation) =

Poletown may refer to:

== Places ==
- Poletown East, Detroit, a neighborhood in Detroit, Michigan
- Poletown, Virginia, a community in Wythe County

== Other ==
- Poletown (album), by Donnie Iris
