= Together Alone (Donnie Iris album) =

Studio album by Donnie Iris and the Cruisers
- Released: 20 November 1999
- Genre: Rock
- Length: 1:02:54
- Label: Primary
- Producer: Mark Avsec

Donnie Iris and the Cruisers chronology
Live! At Nick's Fat City (1998)	Together Alone (1999)	20th Century Masters (2001)

Together Alone is the ninth studio album by American rock singer Donnie Iris, released on 20 November 1999.

== Track listing ==
1. "Amazing Grace" (John Newton)
2. "The Promise" (Hoenes)
3. "Lay with Me" (Avsec)
4. "Together Alone" (Avsec)
5. "You're Holding My Heart in Your Hands" (Avsec)
6. "Fade Away" (Avsec)
7. "Ah! Leah!" (acoustic version) (Avsec, Iris)
8. "I'd Rather Go Blind" (Avsec)
9. "Holy Love" (Avsec)
10. "Amazing Grace" (extended version) (Newton)

== Personnel ==
=== Donnie Iris and the Cruisers ===
- Donnie Iris - vocals
- Mark Avsec - organ, accordion, synths, piano, vocals
- Marty Lee Hoenes - guitar and vocals
- Paul Goll - bass guitar and vocals
- Tommy Rich - drums

=== Guest performers ===
- Kelsey Barber (of Brownie Mary)
- Scott Blasey (of the Clarks)
- Jim DeSpirito (of Rusted Root)
- Joe Grushecky
- Michael Stanley
- B. E. Taylor
- Rick Witkowski (of B. E. Taylor)

== Production ==
- Mark Avsec - Producer
- Greg Zydyk - Engineer, Mixing
- Marty Lee Hoenes - Design
