= Footsoldier in the Moonlight =

Studio album by Donnie Iris and the Cruisers
- Released: September 9, 1993
- Genre: Rock
- Label: Seathru
- Producer: Mark Avsec

Donnie Iris and the Cruisers chronology
Out of the Blue (1992)	Footsoldier in the Moonlight (1993)	Poletown (1997)

Footsoldier in the Moonlight is the seventh studio album by American rock singer Donnie Iris, released by Seathru on September 9, 1993.

The album was recorded between May 1, 1992 and March 26, 1993. Avsec performed and programmed half of the album (MIDI tracks 3, 4, 7, 9 and 10) at the Cellar in Twinsburg, Ohio. The remaining five tracks were band performances, recorded at Jeree Recording Studio in New Brighton, Pennsylvania. All overdubs were recorded at the latter studio and mixing took place at Midtown Recording Studios in Cleveland.

At the time of its release, the album received a mediocre reception from fans and Avsec and Iris later expressed regret about it. Avsec criticized it as "the worst album we ever made" and recalled for The Story of Donnie Iris and the Cruisers, "Before I started my law career, I tried one last gasp. It was a terrible album. There was no magic in the tracks and the feel on that album is just awful. I was more interested in my legal career."

== Critical reception ==
Professional ratings
Review scores
Source	Rating
Kerrang!	3/5 stars
Northwest Herald	2.5/5 stars

Dave Reynolds of the UK magazine Kerrang! considered Footsoldier in the Moonlight to be a "patchy affair" but also Iris's "strongest LP" since 1981's King Cool. He noted the "usual slabs of sing-a-long hard pop" and a "healthy dose of Cruisers' humour". He was critical of the "quite dreadful" track "A Sword and a Shield", on which Iris "sounds like a badly crooning drunk outside your front door at 4am". Jeff Vorva of the Northwest Herald noted that "unfortunately some of the bite of Iris' earlier solo work is missing" and "he swipes a lot from other artists and songs". He called "Intentional Infliction of Emotional Distress" "fun", but felt it was reminiscent of Huey Lewis and the News' "Workin' for a Livin'". He picked "Kamakazi" and "Rally with Sally" as two of the highlights and added, "More of that and less clowning and stealing would make this a better return for Iris."

== Track listing ==
1. "Kamakazi" (Avsec) – 4:21
2. "Intentional Infliction of Emotional Distress" (Avsec) – 3:32
3. "The Best Possible World" (Avsec) – 5:24
4. "Mercy Mercy Me" (Marvin Gaye) – 4:39
5. "Minnie the Moocher" (Cab Calloway, Irving Mills, Clarence Gaskill) – 5:27
6. "Rally with Sally" (Avsec) – 5:27
7. "Gloria" (Van Morrison) – 4:37
8. "A Sword and a Shield" (Avsec) – 4:38
9. "The Reasonable Prudent Person" (Avsec) – 2:48
10. "The First Love" (Avsec) – 5:31

== Personnel ==
Donnie Iris and the Cruisers

- Donnie Iris – lead and background vocals, guitar
- Mark Avsec – keyboards, harmonica and background vocals
- Marty Lee Hoenes – guitars and background vocals
- Scott Alan Williamson – bass guitar and background vocals
- Steve McConnell – drums and percussion

=== Additional musicians ===
- Pete Tokar – additional percussion (tracks 3, 4)
- Kenny Blake – alto saxophone (track 4)
- Danna Avsec – Hammond organ (track 3), DD-12 conga percussion (track 10)

Production

- Mark Avsec – production
- Jerry Reed – engineering
- Pete Tokar – mixing
- Rick Essig – mastering

Other

- Marty Lee Hoenes – design
- Ed Bernik – photography
