= Magnificent Obsession (album) =

Studio album by Cellarful of Noise
- Released: March 1988
- Genres: Pop-rock, Synthpop
- Length: 38:01
- Label: CBS Associated Records
- Producer: Mark Avsec

Cellarful of Noise chronology
Cellarful of Noise (1985)	Magnificent Obsession (1988)

Magnificent Obsession is the second and final studio album from 1980s American pop-rock act Cellarful of Noise, a solo project of Mark Avsec of Donnie Iris fame. The album was released in March 1988, with some of the tracks featuring Donnie Iris on vocals.

== Background ==
During 1984–85, Mark Avsec began working on a solo project under the moniker Cellarful of Noise. After releasing the album of the same name that year, both Avsec and Donnie Iris maintained that Donnie Iris and the Cruisers were still their main focus. The band returned to the studio in 1986 and recorded a new album titled Cruise Control; however, a lawsuit with the band's former label MCA resulted in the shelving of the album. With the band's current label HME going out of business, the band became an unsigned act. Since the band had come to a halt, Avsec started working on the second Cellarful of Noise album Magnificent Obsession. This time, however, he approached Iris to help on the project, and he provided lead vocals on a selection of tracks, as well as co-writing a couple of them. Alan Greene once more contributed guitar parts, while the Cruisers' Marty Lee also added some guitar. Released in 1988, the album produced a moderately successful single, "Samantha (What You Gonna Do?)", which reached No. 69 on the Billboard Hot 100 chart in April 1988. Afterwards Avsec backed away from the music scene as a solo act and has since continued to perform and record with Iris as well as pursue his full-time career as an entertainment lawyer.

In a 1988 interview with AOR Basement, Avsec revealed to Ian McIntosh: "After doing another LP [with Donnie Iris] called "Cruise Control", I went off to work with Mason Ruffner on his "Gypsy Blood" LP. After that I started doing the new Cellarful of Noise record and eventually I asked Donnie if he'd like to team up with me and he was into that. Then we went to England (Bath) to mix it, and now here's that record coming out..." He also spoke of the debut Cellarful of Noise album: "Right after it came out, I wanted to get more serious about it and make a better sounding record." When asked about the future of the project, Avsec stated "For now we're watching what's happening - if the new LP does well then we'll eventually put together a band and hit the road. I'm always writing new material too. Obviously Donnie and I are looking forward to doing another record when the time comes."

The only single from the album, "Samantha", concerned a teenager deciding whether or not to have an abortion after an unplanned pregnancy. The album features a cover of "Heartzone", a song originally performed by the band The Innocent on their 1985 album Livin' in the Street. The band featured drummer Kevin Valentine and guitarist Albritton McClain, who were both members of Donnie Iris and the Cruisers. Avsec revealed of the song to AOR Basement: "I heard that song right after it was first done in the studio and it totally slayed me! Unfortunately the record company never picked up on it. So I asked Rodney Psyka if I could use it and he said yes. It's quite noticeable that on my version there's no guitars - I wanted to make it sound a bit different, even though it was a real guitar song before."

== Recording ==
The album was recorded in Avsec's basement studio "The Cellar", in Twinsburg, Ohio, which was equipped with MIDI. It was mixed by Ted Hayton, Avsec and Iris at Crescent Studios in Bath, England. The album was mastered by Jack Skinner at Sterling Sound in New York City. "Samantha"'s vocals were recorded at Jeree's Studio in New Brighton, Pennsylvania, while the guitar was recorded at Beachwood Recording Studios in Beachwood, Ohio. The song was digitally transferred and mixed by Joe Barbaria at Soundworks Studio, New York City.

Iris enjoyed making the album using the MIDI method, as it avoided interference from engineers, producers and the record company. He noted: "You're down there by yourself, creating what you want to create, and that's the way it comes out. The best thing about it is, once you have all that equipment, you can just save so much money in studio time." Avsec also spoke of the studio work in the AOR Basement interview: "I think next time I'll do all the sequencing in 'The Cellar' and then go to a 24-track studio to do the vocals. For "Samantha", we went back to a studio called Jeree Studios with an engineer called Jerry Reed who went through the bulk of the Cruisers days with me and Donnie. I credit that studio with the distinctive vocal sounds we got on the Cruisers' LPs, I've never found another studio where I can get the same sound - I'm a real freak for the vocals!"

== Release ==
The album was released on vinyl and cassette in America only, via CBS Associated Records. It was also manufactured and distributed by the same label. To date it has not been released on CD, and has remained out-of-print since its original release.

== Critical reception ==
Professional ratings
Review scores
Source	Rating
Kerrang!	2/5 stars

Upon its release, Billboard stated: "Despite the Beatles-esque name, this two-man outfit plays solidly soulful synthpop with no shortage of radiowise hooks. Programmers should look into 'Samantha' and 'Heartzone'." Cash Box listed the album as one of their feature picks of March 1988 and commented: "Cleveland-based outfit are gaining strong response due to the LP's first single, 'Samantha,' which is currently obtaining impressive attention at radio." In the UK, Derek Oliver of Kerrang! was critical of the album, calling it "patchy and idiosyncratic" as the songs "romp around in a melodic yet unclassifiable pop rock form". He considered there to be a "muted energy level and too many modern production things rearing their ugly head", resulting in an album that is "well crafted but [with] no emotion".

Steve "Spaz" Schnee of AllMusic spoke of the album in a retrospective write-up of the Cellarful of Noise's biography: "Three years after the first album, the long-delayed sophomore release, Magnificent Obsession, finally appeared with a bigger, beefier sound and with Iris on board, singing lead on about half the album, including the fabulous opener "Samantha (What You Gonna Do?)." Though the album was made for the times, the general public never got a chance to hear it." In AOR Basement, writer Ian McIntosh stated "If you haven't heard the Magnificent Obsession LP, then I heartily recommend it although it is far more overtly poppy than the majority of the old Cruisers material. The songs are as strong as ever and it makes a perfect companion for the classic King Cool LP."

== Track listing ==
No.	Title	Writer(s)	Length
1.	"Samantha (What You Gonna Do?)"	Mark Avsec	3:29
2.	"The Day Before They Dropped the Bomb"	Avsec	4:26
3.	"First Love"	Avsec	4:21
4.	"Heartzone"	R. Psyka, A. Greene, G. Jones	4:50
5.	"Shake It Loose"	Avsec	3:26
6.	"Temper, Temper"	Avsec, D. Iris, M. L. Hoenes	4:21
7.	"Shuck and Jive"	Avsec	4:23
8.	"Women"	Avsec, Iris	5:04
9.	"Life After Love"	B. Burger	4:15

== Personnel ==
- Mark Avsec - all musical instruments, lead vocals, background vocals, producer, engineering, mixing
- Donnie Iris - lead vocals, background vocals, mixing
- Marty Lee - guitar (tracks 6, 8–9), DX7 Clavinet (track 7)
- Alan Greene - guitar (track 1)
- Ted Hayton - mixing, remix engineering
- Jack Skinner - mastering
- Jerry Reed - vocal engineer (track 1)
- James DeMain - guitar engineer (track 1)
- Joe Barbaria - digital transfer, mixing (track 1)
- Ed Avsec - studio maintenance
- Belkin Personal Management - management
- Stacy Drummond - art direction, design
- Sandra Haber - photography
