= Tough World =

Single by Donnie Iris

from the album The High and the Mighty
- B-side: "You're Gonna Miss Me"
- Released: October 1982
- Recorded: 1982
- Genre: Rock
- Length: 3:48
- Label: MCA
- Songwriters: Mark Avsec, Donnie Iris, Marty Lee Hoenes
- Producer: Mark Avsec

Donnie Iris singles chronology
"My Girl" (1982)	"Tough World" (1982)	"The High and the Mighty" (1982)

"Tough World" is a song by American rock musician Donnie Iris from his 1982 album The High and the Mighty. The song was released as a single the same year and reached #57 on the U.S. Billboard Hot 100, #63 on Cash Box, and #26 on the U.S. Billboard Mainstream Rock chart.

== Critical reception ==
Upon its release, Cash Box wrote: "Another dose of wall-of-sound pop/rock from this latter day Buddy Holly look-alike and his group. The [lyrical] theme is easy enough to identify with, but it is the band's dense, rallying cry that is the key."

== Charts ==
Chart (1982)	Peak position
U.S. Billboard Hot 100	57
U.S. Billboard Mainstream Rock Tracks	26
