= I Can't Hear You (Donnie Iris song) =

Single by Donnie Iris

from the album Back on the Streets
- Released: 1981
- Recorded: 1980
- Genre: Rock
- Label: Midwest National
- Songwriter(s): Mark Avsec, Donnie Iris, Albritton McClain, Marty Lee Hoenes, Kevin Valentine
- Producer(s): Mark Avsec

Donnie Iris singles chronology
| "Ah! Leah!" (1981) | "I Can't Hear You" (1981) | "Sweet Merilee" (1981) |

"I Can't Hear You" is a song by American rock musician Donnie Iris from his 1980 album Back on the Streets. The song was released as a single one year later and reached #47 on the U.S. Billboard Mainstream Rock Tracks chart.

== Charts ==
| Chart (1981) | Peak Position |
|---|---|
| U.S. Billboard Mainstream Rock Tracks | 47 |
