= Do You Compute? =

Single by Donnie Iris

from the album Fortune 410
- Released: 1983
- Recorded: 1983
- Genre: Rock
- Label: MCA
- Songwriters: Mark Avsec, Donnie Iris
- Producer: Mark Avsec

Donnie Iris singles chronology
| "The High and the Mighty" (1982) | "Do You Compute?" (1983) | "Injured in the Game of Love" (1985) |

"Do You Compute?" is a song by American rock musician Donnie Iris from his 1983 album Fortune 410. The song was released as a single the same year and reached #64 on the U.S. Billboard Hot 100 chart and #20 on the U.S. Billboard Mainstream Rock Tracks chart.

Iris said in a 1983 interview: "We wanted to write a love song, but we wanted a more modern title, something up to date."

The music video for the song prominently features the Atari 1200XL computer, including Iris typing on it and his band performing inside of it.

== Critical reception ==
Upon its release, Cash Box noted the "novel electronic percussion" opening which "then gives way to a heavy production thick with guitars and keyboards and the singer's heartfelt vocals". They added that "facing a communications barrier, Iris tries to break through in the lyrics". Geoff Barton of Kerrang! called it "a kinda anthemic cross betw[een] Howard Jones' 'What Is Love?', Van Halen's controversial-but-commercial 'Jump' and Rick Springfield's techno-shocker 'Human Touch'" and noted the "sparse, steadily building, ultra-modern sound" which "brings AOR into the Eighties with a vengeance".

== Charts ==
| Chart (1983) | Peak position |
|---|---|
| US Billboard Hot 100 | 64 |
| US Billboard Top Rock Tracks | 20 |
| US Top 100 Singles (Cash Box) | 78 |
| US AOR Hot Tracks (Radio & Records) | 21 |
