= Cellarful of Noise (album) =

Studio album by Cellarful of Noise
- Released: June 1985
- Genres: Pop-rock, Synthpop
- Length: 38:01
- Label: CBS Associated Records
- Producers: Kevin Valentine, Mark Avsec

Cellarful of Noise chronology
Cellarful of Noise (1985)	Magnificent Obsession (1988)

Cellarful of Noise is the debut studio album from 1980s pop-rock act Cellarful of Noise, a solo project of Mark Avsec of Donnie Iris fame. The album was released in June 1985.

== Background ==
In 1984, Avsec had spare time to begin working in his home studio in Twinsburg on demos which he began recording in winter 1984. The 40-50 songs he wrote had not been intended for a solo project, but were demos for Donnie Iris and the Cruisers. However, after being offered a solo album deal with CBS Records, Avsec selected ten of his recordings for a solo project under the moniker Cellarful of Noise. Cruisers' former drummer Kevin Valentine helped produce the record. In a 1988 interview with AOR Basement, Avsec revealed how the project came to be released by CBS: "I had some spare time and I was really just experimenting in my basement with an eight-track and some midi-equipment. My manager, Mike Belkin, shopped the tapes and CBS put it out, virtually as it was - although it was really just me messing around. Right after it came out, though, I wanted to get more serious about it and make a better sounding record."

In a 1985 interview with Scene magazine, Avsec said: "It's just a little hobby, I always like to be busy doing something. I've got an eight-track studio in my basement, and one day I was talking to Mike Belkin and I told him I'd like to try writing some songs. I didn't really feel like getting involved with another artist or anything like that. I've done a lot of that. I just felt I needed to be by myself. I wanted to be able to write lots of songs without having to try to write certain kinds of songs." Speaking of Kevin Valentine, he said: "Kevin's pretty talented in that area [production]. He has always been more than a drummer. He's got good ears and he knows what to play. He thinks of the record as a whole. I'm the artist working on the thing, and then he can come in there, and I really need his input and opinion. And he can co-produce the album, which is what happened. I basically did all the vocals, keys and bass. We weren't exactly dealing with state of the art equipment, but we got into the spirit." The other musician to work on the album was Alan Greene, who like Valentine, was part of the band The Innocents at the time.

The album's only single, "I'd Walk the Line", was released in America by CBS and in the Netherlands by Epic. The B-Side was the album track "Something Goin' On with Us". It was released on both 7" and 12" vinyl, with the latter version adding a third track; "Easier Said than Done", also from the album. After releasing the album, Avsec said there were no plans for any live gigs to support it, though a video for the single was put forward as a possible option. This never came to fruition. Avsec and Iris maintained that Donnie Iris and the Cruisers was still their main focus, and that they wanted to continue to release new albums with the band. The band released No Muss...No Fuss in 1985 and returned to the studio again in 1986 to record a new album Cruise Control; however, a lawsuit with the band's former label MCA resulted in the shelving of the album. Later, the band's label HME went out of business and the band became an unsigned act. Avsec then began work on the second Cellarful of Noise album Magnificent Obsession, which featured Iris' involvement. Released in 1988, the album produced a moderately successful single, "Samantha (What You Gonna Do)".

== Recording and release ==
The album was recorded and mixed within Avsec's basement studio "The Cellar", in Twinsburg, Ohio. It was mastered by Jack Skinner at Sterling Sound in New York.

The album was released on vinyl and cassette only, in America via CBS Associated Records, and on vinyl in the Netherlands via Epic Records. In America the album was also manufactured and distributed by the CBS label. To date it has not been released on CD, and has remained out-of-print since its original release.

== Track listing ==
No.	Title	Writer(s)	Length
1.	"I'd Walk the Line"	Mark Avsec	3:18
2.	"Can't Squeeze Blood from Rock"	Avsec	4:31
3.	"The Price of Love"	Avsec	4:47
4.	"Everyday I Fall in Love with Someone"	Avsec	2:56
5.	"You'll Never Break My Heart Again"	Avsec	3:46
6.	"Something Goin' On with Us"	Avsec	4:07
7.	"Heartwrecker"	Avsec	3:54
8.	"Easier Said than Done"	Avsec	3:59
9.	"Gonna Act Like a Man"	Avsec	3:48
10.	"Can't Put a Leash on Love"	Avsec	3:41

== Critical reception ==
Professional ratings
Review scores
Source	Rating
Billboard	favorable
Cash Box	favorable
The Toledo Blade	favorable

Upon release, Billboard wrote: "Mark Avsec is the driving force behind this pop/rock project, which recalls Iris' robust style in its tight arrangements, dramatic vocal style and solid writing, aimed at mainstream." Richard Paton of The Toledo Blade stated: "The name suggests post-punk mayhem, but in fact this is an album of tightly crafted power pop and rock with more catchy hooks than a fisherman's hat. The hooks get you from the opening track, "I'd Walk the Line," while other songs such as the tougher "Heartwrecker," have an almost anthemic quality. On "Easier Said than Done" the rock is wrapped in lush harmony. The album suffers somewhat from a lack of variety, but the energy it exudes is contagious."

Cash Box commented: "With a vocal and melodic approach reminiscent of Frankie Valli, Cellarful of Noise comes up with a promising debut. The one man band combines elements of modern sonics, upbeat rhythms and singable melodies." Steve "Spaz" Schnee of AllMusic spoke of the album in a retrospective write-up of the Cellarful of Noise's biography: "This keyboard-based album featured many of Avsec's production trademarks and great vocals, though the sound was a bit muddy and thin. With a little help from Cruisers' Marty Lee and Kevin Valentine, this was more or less a one-man affair and an album filled with great melodies and plenty of heart, sweat, and tears. Unfortunately, the album didn't set the charts on fire, Iris and the Cruisers were on hold, and Avsec quietly disappeared into the musical wilderness."

== Personnel ==
- Mark Avsec - lead vocals, background vocals, synthesizers, drum computer, bass, producer, engineering
- Kevin Valentine - drums, producer, engineering
- Alan Greene - guitar
- Jack Skinner - mastering
- Belkin Personal Management - management
- Kenny Avsec – equipment
- Susan Haffey – organization, paperwork
- Mark Larson – design
- Raúl Vega - photography
