= She Don't Know Me =

Song by Bon Jovi

Single by Bon Jovi

from the album Bon Jovi
- Released: May 26, 1984; 42 years ago
- Recorded: September 1982
- Studio: Power Station (New York, New York)
- Genre: Hard rock, glam metal
- Length: 4:02
- Label: Polygram
- Songwriter: Mark Avsec
- Producers: Tony Bongiovi; Lance Quinn

Bon Jovi singles chronology
"Runaway" (1984)	"She Don't Know Me" (1984)	"Burning for Love" (1984)

Music video
- She Don't Know Me at Youtube.com

"She Don't Know Me" is a single by American rock band Bon Jovi. It was the second single from their self-titled debut album Bon Jovi (1984). It was written by Mark Avsec (of Donnie Iris & The Cruisers fame) and charted at #48 on the Billboard Hot 100.

This is the only release in Bon Jovi's discography that was not written or co-written by a member of the band.

== Background ==
In the early 1980s, after a stint playing in the band Wild Cherry, Avsec wrote and produced the debut album for the disco band LaFlavour, who scored a pair of minor hits with "Mandolay" and "Only the Lonely (Have a Reason to be Sad)" upon the album's release in 1980. At the time, Bon Jovi and LaFlavour were both signed to labels owned by Polygram. By the time Avsec composed LaFlavour's follow-up album, however, the band's name was changed to Fair Warning, and its disco image was scrapped. "She Don't Know Me" is one of the songs Avsec penned for the upcoming record, and is the lead-off track on what was to be Fair Warning's self-titled album.

However, around this same time as LaFlavour's transformation, PolyGram was preparing to release Bon Jovi's debut album, and they were looking for a strong hit single. The decision was made for Bon Jovi to also record "She Don't Know Me" and feature it on the debut album. This prioritization of Bon Jovi, combined with the fact that Van Halen was releasing an album with the same title of Fair Warning that year, caused the stagnation of the Fair Warning project. Beyond a few promotional copies, Fair Warning's self-titled album was never officially released. The Bon Jovi album was released years later.

Meanwhile, in the ensuing interim period, two already well-established musical acts covered the tune. The well-known 1960s/70s band The Grass Roots included a version of the song on their 1982 reunion album, Powers of the Night. The following year, former Outsiders and Climax frontman Sonny Geraci recorded his own version under the pseudonym "Peter Emmett" (backed by the Donnie Iris and the Cruisers band, including Avsec).

In 1984, Bon Jovi's self-titled debut album was finally released, and "She Don't Know Me" was released as a follow-up to the band's first hit, "Runaway".

== Music video ==
A music video was released in the USA in May 1984 to promote the song. It was directed by Martin Kahan and produced by Lenny Grodin, and features the band – primarily Jon Bon Jovi – in live action vignette scenes centered around a local bar, inter-cut with staged performance shots. Jon is troubled by thoughts of an unattainable woman, portrayed as a split character by Beth Toussaint; several classic vintage automobiles are used as set pieces. The current version's end scene has been edited to remove a part where the woman's alter ego levels a gun at two thugs that are about to assault her. The scenes were filmed at and around the Brewery Bar, in Benicia, California, with director Kahan making a cameo appearance.

== Track listings ==
US vinyl single

- "She Don't Know Me" – 3:55
- "Burning for Love" – 3:52

UK vinyl, 7-inch single

- "She Don't Know Me"
- "Breakout"

== Chart performance ==
Chart (1984)	Peak position
US Billboard Hot 100	48
