= My Girl (Donnie Iris song) =

Single by Donnie Iris

from the album King Cool
- B-side: "The Last to Know"
- Released: March 1982
- Recorded: 1981
- Genre: Rock, Doo-wop, pop rock
- Length: 3:56
- Label: MCA
- Songwriters: Mark Avsec, Donnie Iris
- Producer: Mark Avsec

Donnie Iris singles chronology
"Love Is Like a Rock" (1982)	"My Girl" (1982)	"Tough World" (1982)

"My Girl" is a song by American rock musician Donnie Iris from his 1981 album King Cool. The song was released as a single the following year and reached #25 on the U.S. Billboard Hot 100 chart. It was his highest charting hit single, the last of three which reached the Top 40.

The song has a late 1950s and 1960s-inspired doo-wop and R&B-inspired beat and composition.

== Critical reception ==
Upon its release, Cash Box considered "My Girl" to be a "Beatlesque cut" that "sounds like [a] John and Paul re-working" of "Lullaby of Broadway". They concluded that it "should make a substantial pop impact". Record World praised it as an "endearing single" and a "natural for pop radio" as "unique choruses and smart percussion surround Iris' slick vocal lead".

== Charts ==
Chart (1982)	Peak position
Canada RPM Top Singles	47
US Billboard Hot 100	25
US Contemporary Hit Radio National Airplay (Radio & Records)	15
UK Airplay Guide (Record Business)	74
