= Donnie Iris =

American rock musician (1943–2026)

- Iris in 2011

Background information
- Born: Dominic Ierace; February 28, 1943; New Castle, Pennsylvania, U.S.
- Died: October 26, 2026 (aged 83) Pittsburgh, Pennsylvania, U.S.
- Genres: Rock, pop rock, power pop, hard rock
- Instruments: Guitar, vocals
- Years active: 1961–2026
- Labels: Midwest National Records (1979–1980); MCA Records (1980–1984); HME Records (1984–1985); Seathru Records (1992–1997); Primary Records (1997–2026)
- Website: donnieiris.com

Dominic Ierace (February 28, 1943 – October 26, 2026), known professionally as Donnie Iris, was an American rock musician known for his work with the Jaggerz and Wild Cherry during the 1970s and for his solo career beginning in the 1980s with his band, the Cruisers. He wrote the No. 2 Billboard hit "The Rapper" with the Jaggerz in 1970 and was a member of Wild Cherry. He also achieved fame as a solo artist beginning in 1980 with the No. 29 hit "Ah! Leah!" and the No. 37 hit "Love Is Like a Rock."

In addition to performing on the first three Jaggerz albums and the fourth and final Wild Cherry album, Iris with his solo band has released eleven studio albums, one EP, two live albums and two compilations. He continued to intermittently release new material and tour throughout the greater Pittsburgh, Youngstown and Cleveland, Ohio, areas.

== Life and career ==
=== Early life and early career (1943–1963) ===
Dominic Ierace was born on February 28, 1943, to Samuel and Carrie Ierace (née DeCola) in New Castle, Pennsylvania, northwest of Pittsburgh. He grew up in nearby Ellwood City. Ierace learned to sing at an early age from his mother, who had sung in Curly Venezie's orchestra. He practiced by singing along with his mother's favorite singers, Frank Sinatra and Tony Bennett. With her encouragement, Ierace began singing at weddings when he was five. By the time he was eight, he was performing on local television and entering talent contests.

Over time, Ierace began to develop his own interests in music with the advent of rock music, drawing inspiration from Elvis Presley, Buddy Holly and later from the Beatles, the Rolling Stones, and even R&B and soul artists Marvin Gaye and Ray Charles in addition to other Motown acts. The popularity of rock and roll inspired Ierace to become a self-taught guitarist. When his voice changed around age 12, he gave up singing and took up the drums.

About the time he was a senior in high school (circa 1961), Ierace's voice changed again and he returned to singing. He formed a vocal doo-wop group called the Fabutons with Johnny Roth, Anthony Matteo, Lou Delessandro, and Chuckie Hasson and performed gigs in Beaver and Lawrence counties in Pennsylvania. However, the group only performed a few times before disbanding and Ierace went to college. While attending Slippery Rock State College in Slippery Rock about 16 miles to the northeast of New Castle, Ierace formed a band called the Tri-Vels with guitarist Jim Evans and drummer Dave Amodie, two fellow students at Slippery Rock. With the addition of bassist Dave Reiser, they renamed themselves Donnie and the Donnells. The band in both incarnations played R&B and pop rock covers at fraternity parties and lasted from about 1961 to 1964.

=== The Jaggerz and Wild Cherry (1964–1979) ===
Around 1964, Ierace left Donnie and the Donnells to form the Jaggerz (originally the "Jaggers") with Benny Faiella of Gary and the Jewel Tones into the outfit. After a few changes in the line-up early on (including acquiring Jimmie Ross and Jim Pugliano from the Bell Boys), the group became popular playing R&B covers throughout western Pennsylvania and northeast Ohio. Eventually, Ierace and the Jaggerz began to write their own material and secured a contract with Gamble Records. Their first album, Introducing the Jaggerz, was released in 1969. The album was only a minor success, mainly receiving airplay in Iris' native Beaver County and the rest of the greater Pittsburgh area. Perhaps most importantly, it was the first album Ierace recorded on.

Ierace and the Jaggerz first came to national prominence in 1970 for the No. 2 hit "The Rapper," written by Ierace and included on their second album, We Went to Different Schools Together, released on the Kama Sutra label. The album reached No. 69 on the chart. The Jaggerz released one more album, Come Again in 1975 when they signed with Wooden Nickel Records. However it failed to produce any more hits for the group. Between 1975 and 1976, most of the Jaggerz' longtime members left the group, including Ierace in 1976. The Jaggerz eventually broke up around 1977 but reunited in 1989 without Ierace, who by that point was well into his solo career.

After his departure from the Jaggerz, Ierace began to learn engineering at Jeree Recording in New Brighton, Pennsylvania to the northwest of Pittsburgh. Also, he played shows from 1976 to 1978 with B. E. Taylor. While working at Jeree, the band Wild Cherry (a hot commodity because of their 1976 hit "Play That Funky Music," which had been recorded there) was booked for a recording session. Ierace helped engineer their third album, I Love My Music. The band was also looking for a new guitarist and after learning of Ierace and his association with "The Rapper," he was recruited by frontman Rob Parissi. Ierace went on the road with the group for about a year and was featured on their 1979 album Only the Wild Survive.

Throughout the 1970s, Ierace was credited by various names on Jaggerz and Wild Cherry albums: by his birth name, Dominic Ierace; Don Ierace; and a stage name he had adopted to make it easier for people to remember his name, Don Iris. By the end of the decade, at least in his music/public life he went by the name of Donnie Iris. During that period he became acquainted with Mark Avsec, then playing keyboards for Wild Cherry. Wild Cherry was unable to duplicate the success of "Play That Funky Music" and broke up by the end of the decade. Becoming good friends, Iris and Avsec decided to form a project together after Wild Cherry's breakup and the two began writing songs. Their first release had the disco-influenced single "Bring on the Eighties" backed by a cover of "Because of You" in 1979; however it failed to garner attention. They decided to go in a harder direction with their next release returning to the studio with guitarist Marty Lee Hoenes, bassist Albritton McClain, and drummer Kevin Valentine who at the time was in the band Breathless with Avsec, to record his first album. The line-up became known as Donnie Iris and the Cruisers.

=== Donnie Iris and the Cruisers' peak years (1980–1985) ===
Iris' first album, Back on the Streets, was released in July 1980 on Midwest Records, a small Cleveland label. With the track "Ah! Leah!" receiving airplay in Boston, Cleveland and Pittsburgh, MCA Records took notice and quickly signed Iris to a five-album deal and re-released the album nationally in October. The first single "Ah! Leah!" peaked at No. 29 on the Billboard Hot 100 (and No. 34 in Australia) in February 1981 and became one of the most frequently played AOR tracks of the year, and the album reached No. 57 on the Billboard 200. In addition, the band launched a national tour to promote the album and its follow-up during the summer of 1981.

The follow-up album, King Cool, credited to Donnie Iris and the Cruisers, was released in August 1981 and garnered the band more success, with "Love Is Like a Rock" reaching No. 37 on the Hot 100 and No. 9 on Billboard's Top Tracks chart. Two other songs from the album also received significant radio airplay; "My Girl" became his biggest hit on the Hot 100, peaking at No. 25, while "Sweet Merilee" charted on the Rock Tracks chart at No. 31. In addition, he gained the nickname King Cool from this album in the later part of his career. However, the album itself charted less successfully at No. 84. After the long tour promoting their two previous albums, the band continued songwriting and in the fall of 1982 released The High and the Mighty. The album contained the single "Tough World," but only charted at No. 180, marking a decline in his success, but the band still was determined to release new material.

Their next album one year later, Fortune 410, contained the hit single "Do You Compute?" which was used by their label MCA and the computer company Atari to form a cross-marketing promotion. Because the promotional partnership was secured prior to release of the album, it was possible to use the Atari 1200 XL Home Computer in poster photography, as well as in the video clip for "Do You Compute?", which aired on MTV. The title of the album is a reference to the trademark glasses Iris wore, Fortune 410's. The combination of marketing and the promotion for its hit single allowed the album to chart higher than its predecessor. Despite Fortune 410 charting higher than The High and the Mighty, MCA was displeased that both albums did not chart as high as Back on the Streets and King Cool had. The label suggested that the band allow them to bring in a new producer, displacing Mark Avsec, as well bring in new songwriters. Iris and the Cruisers, wanting to keep as much of their creative freedom and sound as they could, said no. As a result, MCA dropped the band in 1984.

Shortly after being let go from MCA, the band signed with the small HME Records label. Their next album, No Muss...No Fuss, released in 1985, continued the trend set by Fortune 410 by charting at No. 91 with the single "Injured in the Game of Love". Both of the last two albums mentioned ended up being more critically acclaimed than The High and the Mighty.

=== New Cruisers lineups and different projects (1986–1993) ===
Just prior to the release of No Muss...No Fuss, the band began to split into different directions. Drummer Valentine and bassist McClain left to join new group the Innocent, whose members included future Nine Inch Nails main man Trent Reznor. The two were replaced by Scott Alan Williamson on bass and Tommy Rich on drums. In the same year, keyboardist Mark Avsec released a solo project with the moniker Cellarful of Noise. Even after releasing the eponymous debut album that same year, Cellarful of Noise, Avsec and Iris maintained that Donnie Iris and the Cruisers were still their main focus, and that they wanted to continue to release new albums with the band and its new line-up. The band returned to the studio in 1986 and recorded a new album titled Cruise Control; however, a lawsuit with the band's former label MCA resulted in the shelving of that album pending the resolution of the lawsuit. The album itself has still not been released as of 2020, although six tracks from it appeared on 1992's Out of the Blue and a cover of "Reach Out" recorded during the Cruise Control sessions appeared on the 1989 compilation WDVE Pittsburgh Rock & Roll '89. Also around this time, the HME label that the band had signed with to record No Muss... No Fuss went out of business, leaving Donnie Iris and the Cruisers as an unsigned act.

Iris partnered with Avsec on the second Cellarful of Noise album, Magnificent Obsession, which was released in 1988. The album produced a moderately successful single, "Samantha (What You Gonna Do?)". In the early 1990s Iris set up a mortgage company, SIMCorp, with partners Lynn Shelley and Priscilla Micinko, as a side business from the band. SIMCorp in Aliquippa, Pennsylvania, southeast of New Castle, was owned by Iris for nearly twenty years.

Donnie Iris and the Cruisers returned to the studio in 1992 to release their first album containing new material since 1985. Titled Out of the Blue, the album was a compilation album containing older hits and new material. It failed to have any impact on the charts, however. Still, the band toured throughout the rest of the year around Pennsylvania and Ohio, and attracted newer and younger fans from the area. The band released another album in 1993, Footsoldier in the Moonlight. At this point, the band underwent yet another line-up change as drummer Tommy Rich departed the group. His replacement, Steve McConnell, auditioned and was hired in the summer of 1992, long enough to record on and tour behind Footsoldier in the Moonlight and he can be heard on live recordings from 1992 to 1993. Later in 1994, Rich rejoined the group.

=== Later endeavors and new albums (1994–2009) ===
In the summer of 1994, original members Albritton McClain, and Valentine temporarily reunited with Iris, Avsec, and Hoenes to record the first album of all new material by the original line-up in nearly 10 years. During recording, the band performed one reunion show together at Conneaut Lake which is southwest of Erie, Pennsylvania. The album Poletown was released in 1997.

In 1998, the band released their first live album. A collection of tracks played at Nick's Fat City, a popular Pittsburgh nightclub, Live! At Nick's Fat City was the first release to feature bass guitarist Paul Goll, who had been touring with the band since 1993, along with drummer Tommy Rich. 1999 saw the release of an Iris collaborative project entitled Together Alone, featuring contributions from other regionally popular artists like Michael Stanley, Scott Blasey, B. E. Taylor, and Joe Grushecky. After Alone, which featured a softer side of Iris's vocals, the band took a break from releasing new material but continued to perform regularly through the decade.

The first true compilation album from the band was released in 2001 by their former label, MCA: 20th Century Masters: The Millennium Collection: The Best of Donnie Iris, featuring material from the band's four MCA-released albums from the early 1980s. In 2004, the band celebrated its 25th anniversary with a new compilation album featuring their rarer material, 25 Years, and performed live at the Chevrolet Amphitheatre in Pittsburgh for 4,000 people. The concert became known for featuring a four drummer lineup of current and previous drummers for the band; Valentine, Tommy Rich, Brice Foster, and Mark Avsec's daughter Danna Avsec who was the guest drummer. Since then, the band has used a three drummer line-up for several concerts. The band's 2006 album, Ellwood City, was a tribute to Iris's hometown, Ellwood City, Pennsylvania. June 17, 2006 was recognized throughout Lawrence County, Pennsylvania as Donnie Iris Day by Ellwood City Executive Council President Glenn Jones and Mayor Roy P. Meehan. Iris also received special commendations and awards from United States congresswoman Melissa Hart and Pennsylvania state representative Frank LaGrotta.

In 2008 and 2009, King Cool Light was developed after Mark Avsec realized that "King Cool" sounded like the name of a refreshing beer. He later approached Iris and Marty Lee Hoenes who both immediately liked the idea, giving birth to King Cool Limited. King Cool Light was unveiled on November 20, 2009, at Club Diesel in Pittsburgh during the band's 30th anniversary concert. Every case was sold out, but 25 more cases were brought in, which were also sold out. The band's first EP, You Can't Really Miss Me If I Never Go Away, was released in 2008. It was followed in 2009 with their second live album, Ah! Live!, recorded at shows in Erie and Kittanning, Pennsylvania northeast of Pittsburgh.

=== Later years (2010–2026) ===
In an interview with Cleveland Scene published on February 3, 2010, Mark Avsec announced that the band's next project would be a Christmas album. Ah! Leluiah! was released on November 18, 2010. Additionally, King Cool Light was released in the Youngstown, Ohio market in July of the same year. Also in 2010, Iris retired from the mortgage banking.... business and sold SIMCorp. Avsec announced in a March 2012 interview that the band had begun working on their twelfth studio album, due out in 2013 to commemorate Iris' seventieth birthday. However the project turned into a special release to celebrate the thirty-fifth anniversary of the formation of Donnie Iris and the Cruisers, which was expected to be released in 2014. On June 17, 2014, Iris and the Cruisers leaked a new song, "Sing the Songs of Summer (All Night Long)," the first track to be released from the band's intermittent time in the studio in the previous two years. It was followed by "Pittsburgh Made," released on Spotify and for free download in October 2016. On the April 2, 2015 episode of Jim Krenn's No Restrictions podcast, Iris mentioned that he and the band hoped to have the often-delayed album out by the end of 2015. As of February 2025, no new album has been released, making 2010's Ah! Leluiah! his final studio album.

In February 2015, Iris was nominated for a Pittsburgh Rock 'N Roll Legends Award in the modern era category (which is for artists with 20-plus years in the music industry). These awards began in 2014 and they honor those who have made significant contributions to the Pittsburgh rock scene. In his category, Iris went up against Joe Grushecky, Billy Price and Rusted Root. On March 19, it was announced that Iris had won the public voting process to be inducted for the Rock 'N Roll Legends in the category, along with Lou Christie (who was in the Legacy Legends category with 40-plus years in the business) and Porky Chedwick (who was active in the non-performer/musical and professional category for over 20 years). Iris was enshrined with a plaque at the Hard Rock Cafe in Pittsburgh on April 23, 2015 and he performed a set with an all-star Pittsburgh band.

In July 2021, Iris's first four studio albums were reissued in remastered CD form by Rock Candy Records. Each album contains one or more live bonus tracks taken from the 1981 Live at the Paradise, Boston promotional EP.

==== Retirement, illness and death ====
In 2023, Iris began receiving treatment for bladder cancer.

On September 28, 2026, he gave his final performance in Pittsburgh and subsequently announced his retirement on October 9 due to health issues. Donnie Iris died in Pittsburgh a few weeks later on October 26, 2026, at the age of 83.

== Discography ==
=== As a member of the Jaggerz (1964–1976) ===
| Year | Title | Billboard peak | Label |
|---|---|---|---|
| 1969 | Introducing the Jaggerz | — | Gamble |
| 1970 | We Went to Different Schools Together | 62 | Kama Sutra |
| 1975 | Come Again | — | Wooden Nickel |

=== As a member of Wild Cherry (1978–1979) ===
| Year | Title | Billboard peak | Label |
|---|---|---|---|
| 1979 | Only the Wild Survive | — | Epic |

=== Donnie Iris and the Cruisers (1979–2026) ===
==== Studio albums ====
| Year | Title | Billboard peak | Label |
|---|---|---|---|
| 1980 | Back on the Streets | 57 | Midwest National |
| 1981 | King Cool | 84 | MCA |
| 1982 | The High and the Mighty | 180 | MCA |
| 1983 | Fortune 410 | 127 | MCA |
| 1985 | No Muss...No Fuss | 115 | HME |
| 1992 | Out of the Blue | — | Seathru |
| 1993 | Footsoldier in the Moonlight | — | Seathru |
| 1997 | Poletown | — | Seathru |
| 1999 | Together Alone | — | Primary |
| 2006 | Ellwood City | — | Primary |
| 2010 | Ah! Leluiah! | — | Primary |

==== Live albums ====
- Live! At Nick's Fat City, 1998 (Primary)
- Ah! Live!, 2009 (Primary)
- Live Bootleg, 2014 (Primary)

==== Compilation albums ====
- 20th Century Masters: The Millennium Collection: The Best of Donnie Iris, 2001 (MCA)
- Donnie: 25 Years, 2004 (Primary)

==== EP ====
- Live at the Paradise, Boston, 1981 (MCA)
- You Can't Really Miss Me If I Never Go Away, 2008 (Primary)

==== Other appearances ====
- WDVE Pittsburgh Rock 'n Roll '89, 1989 (WDVE-FM) on the song "Reach Out"

==== Singles ====
| Year | Single | Peak positions | | | | Album |
| Year | Single | U.S. | U.S. Mainstream Rock | Australia (Kent Report) | Canada (RPM) | Album |
|---|---|---|---|---|---|---|
| 1979 | "Bring On the Eighties" | - | - | - | - | Non-album single |
| 1980 | "Ah! Leah!" | 29 | 19 | 34 | 6 | Back on the Streets |
| 1981 | "You're Only Dreaming" | - | - | - | - | Back on the Streets |
| 1981 | "I Can't Hear You" | - | 47 | - | - | Back on the Streets |
| 1981 | "The Rapper" (live) | - | - | - | - | Non-album single |
| 1981 | "Sweet Merilee" | 80 | 31 | - | - | King Cool |
| 1981 | "Love Is Like a Rock" | 37 | 9 | - | 43 | King Cool |
| 1982 | "My Girl" | 25 | - | - | 47 | King Cool |
| 1982 | "Tough World" | 57 | 26 | - | - | The High and the Mighty |
| 1982 | "The High and the Mighty" | - | 39 | - | - | The High and the Mighty |
| 1983 | "This Time It Must Be Love" | - | - | - | - | The High and the Mighty |
| 1983 | "Do You Compute?" | 64 | 20 | - | - | Fortune 410 |
| 1985 | "Injured in the Game of Love" | 91 | 28 | - | - | No Muss...No Fuss |
| 1985 | "State of the Heart" | - | - | - | - | No Muss...No Fuss |
| 2014 | "Sing the Songs of Summer (All Night Long)" | - | - | - | - | Non-album single |
| 2016 | "Pittsburgh Made" | - | - | - | - | Non-album single |

==== Videography ====
- Live at Blossom, 1981
- King Cool: Ah! History of Donnie Iris and the Cruisers, 2004 (documentary)

=== Guest appearances ===
- Cellarful of Noise's album, Magnificent Obsession, 1988
- "Baby, It's Cold Outside" (Nina Sainato) on the album Holly and Ivory, 2011

=== Other credits ===
- I Love My Music, 1978 (Epic, peaked at no. 84 on Billboard 200), engineering credit (Wild Cherry)
- Innermission, 1982 (MCA), producer (B. E. Taylor Group)

== Donnie Iris and the Cruisers members ==
Final members

- Mark Avsec, keyboards and background vocals (1979–2026)
- Marty Lee Hoenes, guitar and background vocals (1979–2026)
- Paul Goll, bass and background vocals (1993–2026)
- Kevin Valentine, drums (1979–1985, 1994 reunion, 2003–2026)

Former members

- Donnie Iris, lead vocals (1979–2026; his death)
- Albritton McClain, bass and background vocals (1979–1985, 1994 reunion)
- Scott Alan Williamson, bass and background vocals (1985–1993)
- Tommy Rich, drums (1985–1990, 1994–2003)
- Steve McConnell, drums (1990–1994)
- Brice Foster, drums (2004–2007)

Touring members

- Mark Tirabassi, drums (2007–2026) (fill-in when Kevin Valentine could not travel)
- Joe Vitale Jr, drums (2021–2026) (fill-in when Kevin Valentine could not travel)

Session musicians

- Kenny Blake, saxophone (1980–1981, 1993/Back on the Streets, King Cool and Footsoldier in the Moonlight)
- Robert Peckman, bass (1980/Back on the Streets)
- Rick Bell, saxophone (1983/Fortune 410)
- Dan McCarthy, horns (1983–1984/Fortune 410 and No Muss…No Fuss)
- Rodney Psyka, percussion (1985/No Muss…No Fuss)
- Pete Tokar, percussion (1993/Footsoldier in the Moonlight)
- Alan Green, guitar (2008/You Can't Really Miss Me If I Never Go Away)
