= The Innocent (band) =

US musical group

- Origin: Cleveland, Ohio, United States
- Genres: Hard rock, pop rock
- Years active: 1983-1985
- Labels: CBS, Red Label
- Past members: Alan Greenblatt; Kevin Valentine; Rodney Cajka; Albritton McClain; Trent Reznor; Gary Lee Jones

The Innocent was the band Trent Reznor of Nine Inch Nails played with after leaving The Urge. He then moved on to the Exotic Birds before creating his own band, Nine Inch Nails. The other members were Alan Greenblatt (as Alan Greene), Kevin Valentine, Rodney Cajka (as Rodney Psyka) and Albritton McClain. Valentine and McClain were both members of Donnie Iris and the Cruisers, and they had just recently opted to go on their own way from the band. The band's sole album was released on the regional Red Label Records.

Upon finishing a mini-tour in August 1985 for their only album, Livin' in the Street, Reznor left the band. Synth player and album producer Gary Lee Jones replaced him. Reznor joined Exotic Birds and contributed to the local band Slam Bamboo, before eventually forming Nine Inch Nails.

== Livin' in the Street ==
Livin' in the Street

Studio album by The Innocent
- Released: 1985
- Genre: Pop rock, hard rock, new wave

1. "Livin' in the Street" – 3:47
2. "Freeway Ride" – 4:08
3. "Dora" – 4:41
4. "With You" – 3:50
5. "Heartzone" – 4:57
6. "Top Secret" – 4:01
7. "Love'll Come Knockin'" – 4:39
8. "Back in My Life" – 4:10 *On some editions of the album, this track is unlisted and "Queen Of The Border" is listed as the eighth track instead.
9. "Queen of the Border" – 4:42
10. "The Names Have Been Changed" – 3:43
