= Cellarful of Noise =

US musical group

Cellarful of Noise was a short-lived 1980s rock and new wave pop band featuring Mark Avsec and Kevin Valentine, both members of Donnie Iris and the Cruisers. They released two albums. They also had one song hit the Billboard Hot 100, "Samantha (What You Gonna Do?)", which peaked at #69 in April 1988. They named themselves after Beatles manager Brian Epstein's autobiography of the same name.

== Discography ==
- Cellarful of Noise (1985)
- Magnificent Obsession (1988)
