= I Wish I Had a Girl =

1988 single by Henry Lee Summer

Single by Henry Lee Summer

from the album Henry Lee Summer
- B-side: "Wing Tip Shoes"
- Released: February 1988
- Genre: Southern rock
- Length: 3:55 (7"); 4:23 (album and 12" versions)
- Label: Epic, CBS
- Songwriter: Henry Lee Summer
- Producer: Michael Frondelli

Henry Lee Summer singles chronology
| "I Wish I Had a Girl" (1988) | "Darlin' Danielle Don't" (1988) |

Music video
- "I Wish I Had a Girl" on YouTube

"I Wish I Had a Girl" is a 1988 song by American musician Henry Lee Summer from his self-titled 1988 album Henry Lee Summer, which was released one year after signing with Epic Records. The song also has a BPM of 127 and plays in 4/4 time signature.

== Music video ==
The song was accompanied by a music video featuring Summer walking and singing to women. However, the women leave him throughout the video. In the end he ends up with a woman.

== Charts ==
Chart performance for "I Wish I Had a Girl"
| Chart (1988) | Peak position |
|---|---|
| Australia (Australian Music Report) | 30 |
| US Cash Box Top 100 | 26 |
| US Billboard Hot 100 | 20 |
| US Mainstream Rock (Billboard) | 1 |
