= Injured in the Game of Love =

Single by Donnie Iris

from the album No Muss...No Fuss
- Released: 1985
- Genre: Rock
- Length: 3:26
- Label: HME
- Songwriters: Mark Avsec, Donnie Iris
- Producer: Mark Avsec

Donnie Iris singles chronology
"Do You Compute?" (1983)	"Injured in the Game of Love" (1985)	"State of the Heart" (1985)

"Injured in the Game of Love" is a song by American rock musician Donnie Iris, released in 1985 as the lead single from his fifth studio album No Muss...No Fuss. The song reached number 91 on the US Billboard Hot 100 chart and number 28 on the US Billboard Mainstream Rock chart.

A music video was also produced for the song, which depicts Iris working out in a gym and drinking egg whites.

== Critical reception ==
On its release, Billboard described "Injured in the Game of Love" as "brash, raucous pop" and Iris as a "male counterpart to Joan Jett". Cash Box felt Iris "displays a definite mastery of the pop/rock/dance format" on the track. They noted his "powerful vocals" alongside the "particularly strong music tracks and production values". Praising the song as "a good, singable tune", they believed it should "garner him renewed attention".

== Charts ==
Chart (1985)	Peak position
US Billboard Hot 100	91
US Billboard Mainstream Rock Tracks	28
US AOR Tracks (Radio & Records)	24
