= Poletown, Virginia =

- Unincorporated community
- Location within Virginia Location within the United States
- Coordinates: 36°57′50″N 80°55′00″W
- Country: United States
- State: Virginia
- County: Wythe
- Elevation: 2,083 ft (635 m)
- Time zone: UTC-5 (Eastern (EST))
  - Summer (DST): UTC-4 (EDT)
- GNIS feature ID: 1501354

Poletown is an unincorporated community in Wythe County, Virginia, United States.
