= Sweet Merilee =

Single by Donnie Iris

from the album King Cool
- Released: 1981
- Recorded: 1981
- Genre: Rock
- Label: MCA
- Songwriters: Mark Avsec, Donnie Iris
- Producer: Mark Avsec

Donnie Iris singles chronology
"I Can't Hear You" (1981)	"Sweet Merilee" (1981)	"Love Is Like a Rock" (1982)

"Sweet Merilee" is a song by American rock musician Donnie Iris, released in 1981 as the lead single from his second studio album, King Cool (1981). The song was written by Mark Avsec and Iris, and was produced by Avsec. It reached #80 on the Billboard Hot 100 charts and #31 on the U.S. Billboard Mainstream Rock Tracks charts.

== Critical reception ==
Upon its release, Cash Box described "Sweet Merilee" as "progressive, highly melodic pop/rock" that is "beautifully produced". They added that the "heavily layered vocal choruses" and "textured guitar-keyboard-rhythm parts" "might be considered a successful attempt at blending the adventuresome with the commercial". Record World noted how the "angelic choruses and a crisp rhythm kick surround Iris' vocal charm". They also considered the "big sound production" to be "made for AOR, pop and A/C audiences".

== Charts ==
Chart (1981)	Peak Position
U.S. Billboard Hot 100	80
U.S. Billboard Mainstream Rock Tracks	31
