= Henry Lee Summer =

American songwriter (born 1955)

- Born: July 5, 1955 (age 70); Brazil, Indiana, U.S.
- Genres: Pop, rock
- Occupation: Musician
- Instruments: Guitar, piano, drums
- Years active: 1978–present
- Labels: Majestic, CBS, Epic, Sony
- Website: henryleesummer.com

Henry Lee Summer (born Henry Lee Swartz; July 5, 1955) is an American rock singer and musician.

== Career ==
Born in Brazil, Indiana, Summer played basketball in high school and received a scholarship to play at a college in Montana. However, he decided to skip college and pursue a career in music. Summer began as a singer and drummer, then taught himself to play guitar and keyboards. Throughout the late 70's and early 80's, he toured the American Midwest and South. He released two independent albums with the help of his manager, James Bogard, under their own Majestic Records label. In 1987, Summer signed to Epic CBS Associated.

Summer recorded several successful albums for Epic during the 1980s and 1990s and toured with Stevie Ray Vaughan, Eddie Money, The Doobie Brothers, Chicago, Don Henley, Robert Palmer, Cheap Trick, 38 Special, and Richard Marx. Summer also shared the stage with John Mellencamp at a show in Indianapolis (1988) and another in Bloomington, Indiana (1992) that drew over 40,000 fans. Summer performed at Farm Aid 4 in 1990 along with Elton John, Guns and Roses' last original lineup, and Mellencamp. He has also worked with Jimmy Rip, Graham Maby, Leigh Foxx, and Michael Organ. On February 9, 2014, he was inducted into the Wabash Valley Musicians Hall of Fame.

== Hit songs ==
Summer's song "I Wish I Had a Girl" (No. 1 Mainstream Rock Hit, No. 20 on the Billboard Hot 100) was initially recorded for his 1985 album Time for Big Fun. The song was re-recorded and released on his self-titled debut album on Epic three years later (1988), and this revamped version became the hit. His "Hey Baby" (No. 18 on the Billboard Hot 100) was released in 1989 from his album I've Got Everything. Summer was credited as producer for both the album and the single.

== Legal problems ==
In September 2006, Summer was arrested after the car he was driving crashed into several vehicles in an Indiana neighborhood. Summer pleaded guilty to driving while intoxicated and was sentenced to a year's probation and ordered to pay a fine.

In Indianapolis in May 2009, Summer was again arrested. He was charged with multiple counts including possession of methamphetamine. In June 2009, Summer entered the voluntary drug treatment center Cumberland Heights in Nashville, Tennessee. On November 10, 2009, in a resolution of all charges, Summer pleaded guilty to a misdemeanor and was sentenced to a year's probation and 120 hours of community service.

In November 2010, Summer was arrested for violating his probation by failing to complete community service and failing to call his probation officer. In January 2011, Summer was released from probation after fulfilling his obligations.

== Discography ==
=== Albums ===
- Stay with Me (Majestic, 1984)
- Time for Big Fun (Majestic, 1985)
- Henry Lee Summer (Epic, 1988) U.S. #56
- I've Got Everything (Epic, 1989) U.S. #78
- Way Past Midnight (Epic, 1991)
- Slamdunk (Sony, 1993)
- Smoke and Mirrors (Moon Pie, 1999)
- Live (Midwest Artists Distribution, 1999)
- Big Drum (self-released, 2001)

=== Singles ===
Year	Title	Chart positions			
Year	Title	US BB	US CB	Mainstream Rock	AUS
1988	"I Wish I Had a Girl"	20	26	1	30
1988	"Darlin' Danielle Don't"	57	57	9	—
1988	"Hands On the Radio"	85	—	28	—
1989	"Hey Baby"	18	19	6	—
1991	"Till Somebody Loves You"	51	42	—	—
1992	"Turn It Up"	—	—	47	—

== Film soundtrack songs ==
Henry Lee Summer produced, composed, arranged, or contributed lead vocals to several songs for movie soundtracks including:

- Iron Eagle II "If You Were My Girl" (Summer: lead vocal) produced by Mike Chapman, Tri-Star Pictures (1988)
- Twins "No Way of Knowing" (Summer: producer, lead vocal, some instruments) Universal Pictures, WTG (1988)
- Queens Logic "Fooled Around and Fell in Love" (Summer: lead vocal) New Line Cinema, Epic (1991)
- Sniper "Medicine Man" and "Turn It Up" (Summer: composer, producer, lead vocal) Columbia Pictures (1993)
- Striking Distance "The Boys and the Girls are Doin' it" (Summer: lead vocal) Columbia Tri-Star Pictures (1993)
- The Raffle "I Wish I Had a Girl" (Summer: composer, lead vocal) Capstone Pictures (1994)
