= Love Is Like a Rock =

Single by Donnie Iris

from the album King Cool
- B-side: "Agnes"
- Released: December 1981
- Recorded: 1981
- Genre: Rock
- Length: 3:35
- Label: MCA
- Songwriters: Mark Avsec; Donnie Iris; Marty Lee Hoenes; Albritton McClain; Kevin Valentine
- Producer: Mark Avsec

Donnie Iris singles chronology
"Sweet Merilee" (1981)	"Love Is Like a Rock" (1981)	"My Girl" (1982)

"Love Is Like a Rock" is a song by American rock musician Donnie Iris from his 1981 album King Cool. The song was released as the second single from his second album.

The song reached No. 37 on the U.S. Billboard Hot 100 chart and No. 9 on the U.S. Billboard Mainstream Rock Tracks chart. The song was also recorded by Slade on their 1987 album You Boyz Make Big Noize.

"Love Is Like a Rock" is often used by the Slippery Rock University of Pennsylvania band during football games. Iris attended SRU in the early 1960s.

== Composition ==
In a September 2006 interview with Songfacts, Iris explained the song's origins:

That song was a jam. The group went into the studio and Marty Lee, our guitar player, came up with that riff. We just kind of built around that riff, put the instrumentals down, and that's all we had. We just had what we thought was a good track – guitar, bass, drums. Then Mark and I were in the studio and we listened to the song and wrote the lyrics around the track. That's basically what we do with most of the stuff we've been writing nowadays. We just go with a nice rhythm track of guitar, bass, drums, keyboard, whatever. Come up with what we think is a nice piece of music. Then, Mark will take the tune home and write a lyric for it. Together, we'll work on the harmonies and background vocals and the melodies and things like that. But for "Love is Like a Rock," he and I sat in the studio listening to that rhythm track. I think it was Mark's idea to come up with "love is like a rock," and then, together, we just wrote lines that rhymed.

== Critical reception ==
Upon its release, Cash Box considered "Love Is Like a Rock" to be a "pop/rock anthem" whose "accent is on harmony and melody". The reviewer also noted that the "vocal chant may remind one of Queen's 'We Will Rock You'". Record World noted, "Blistering guitars, raucous chorus cheers and a stark beat support Iris on this rocker, straight from the barroom to AOR-pop radio."

== Charts ==
=== Weekly charts ===
Chart (1981–82)	Peak position
Canada RPM Top Singles	43
U.S. Cash Box Top 100	36
U.S. Billboard Hot 100	37
U.S. Billboard Top Rock Tracks	9

=== Year-end charts ===
Chart (1982)	Rank
U.S. (Joel Whitburn's Pop Annual)	206

== Slade version ==
English rock band Slade recorded a version of the song for their fourteenth studio album You Boyz Make Big Noize, released in 1987. The band's bassist Jim Lea had heard the song and thought the song suited Slade and their style. He also felt it would fit with the commercial rock sound of the time. The song was recorded at Wessex Studios and was one of two tracks from the album to be produced by Roy Thomas Baker. In a 1987 fan club interview, guitarist Dave Hill said of the song: "This track is a cover of an American song which Jim thought sounded a bit like us in its original format. Jim suggested that it would fit in nicely to the current mould of Bon Jovi/Europe. Roy also liked the song, so we got him to produce it. It's got an up-tempo American feel to it."

=== Critical reception ===
In a review of You Boyz Make Big Noize, an American review from Guitar magazine highlighted "Love Is Like a Rock" as one of three of the album's 'hot spots' and stated "No one will ever mistake this for compositional brilliance, but Slade's consistent ability to suck you into their friendly carousing is impressive. It starts with the muscular riff of "Love Is Like a Rock" and never lets up through raspy Holder chorus after chorus." Doug Stone of AllMusic said in a retrospective review of the album: "The raging opener "Love Is Like a Rock," didn't fare any better commercially for the boyz than the tune did for awesome originators Donnie Iris and the Cruisers; this class cut remains an ace way to kick off the album because "Love" is, like, so Slade in the first place." Stone also highlighted the song as an album standout by labeling it an AMG Pick Track. In the album's 2007 Salvo remaster liner notes, writer Chris Ingham said: ""Love Is Like a Rock" is a telling observation about Slade's ongoing quest to style themselves to the times. One of several more obvious candidates for a single than the tracks that were actually chosen, it nevertheless kicks off the record in great rambunctious style."
