= Ah! Leah! =

Single by Donnie Iris

from the album Back on the Streets
- B-side: "Joking"
- Released: October 1980
- Recorded: 1980
- Genre: Power pop; hard rock
- Length: 3:41
- Label: Midwest National, MCA
- Songwriters: Mark Avsec; Donnie Iris
- Producer: Mark Avsec

Donnie Iris singles chronology
"Ah! Leah!" (1980)	"I Can't Hear You" (1981)

"Ah! Leah!" is a song by Mark Avsec and American rock musician Donnie Iris from the latter's 1980 album Back on the Streets. The song has been described as Iris's signature song, as well as the unofficial anthem of the city of Pittsburgh and Western Pennsylvania as a whole.

Eight musicians appeared in early live performances of the song, including lead singer Iris, a drummer, three guitar players, a keyboard player and at least two backing vocalists, one female and one male.

The title of the song has been referred to in the form of puns on a few of Iris's later albums—the 2009 live album Ah! Live! and the 2010 Christmas album Ah! Leluiah!.

== Composition ==
Iris said,

When Mark and I wrote that together in my basement, around the piano, Mark originally had the idea of an anti-war song. And in the background, we wanted to have a hook, or a chorus, or a tune, that sounded almost like a Gregorian chant. And somehow, Mark came up with 'ah, Leah' as just a chant. It wasn't a chick's name, or a certain person or individual in particular. I said, 'You know what, Mark? That's a chick's name.' So that's how we named it 'Ah, Leah.'

It just so happens that there was a girl by the name of Leah who had dated one of the guys in The Jaggerz years ago. She was a very pretty girl, and I had always loved her name. So, instead of an anti-war tune, which we messed around with but couldn't find anything in, it just turned into a love song. Isn't that weird?"

A 2008 report by The Beaver County Times revealed that the Leah in question was Leah Frankford of Chippewa Township, Pennsylvania near Iris's hometown of Ellwood City. Frankford had moved to Florida just before The Jaggerz hit it big, and got confirmation from Iris himself after Iris's girlfriend by chance became friends with Frankford's daughter through Iris's mortgage business. Frankford had moved back to Beaver County by the time the song came out, and always noticed many girls at her two daughters' softball games also named Leah.

=== 1981 lawsuit ===
In 1981, Mark Alton, a part-time songwriter from Detroit, claimed that the chorus of "Ah! Leah" was nearly identical to his song "Here I Go Again" and filed a $2 million lawsuit for copyright infringement. Alton claimed he gave a representative of MCA Records, Rodney Linnum, a demo tape of his song approximately eight months before "Ah! Leah!" was released. Linnum disputed the possibility that Iris and Avsec could have heard Alton's demo tape as Iris' debut album Back on the Streets, which included "Ah! Leah!", was recorded for and originally released by Midwest Records, before the band signed to MCA. Iris and Avsec denied Alton's claims and, after they protested their innocence and refused to settle, the case went to a jury trial which cleared them of any infringement. Although they won their case, Iris and Avsec lost the royalties they gained from the song in attorneys' fees, amounting to approximately $120,000. The lawsuit inspired Avsec to embark on a career as an intellectual property attorney in the 1990s and he graduated from the Cleveland–Marshall College of Law in 1994.

== Critical reception ==
Upon its release, Cash Box praised "Ah! Leah!" as "brilliant pop, AOR fare" on which "passionately sultry rock rhythm backs Iris' perfectly layered vocal work to the hilt, as the diamond hard guitars work their spell with machinelike efficiency".

== Chart performance ==
It was released as a single in late 1980 and reached number 29 on the US Billboard Hot 100, 22 on the Cash Box Top 100 and 19 on the US Billboard Top Tracks chart, and was most popular in Canada, where it became a Top 10 hit.

=== Weekly charts ===
Chart (1980–81)	Peak position
Australian (Kent Music Report)	34
Canada RPM	6
US Billboard Hot 100	29
US Billboard Mainstream Rock	19
US Cash Box Top 100	22

=== Year-end charts ===
Chart (1981)	Position
Canada	53

== In popular culture ==
The song has become the unofficial anthem of the city of Pittsburgh and remains a staple on local radio stations alongside Iris's other hit songs such as The Rapper and Love is Like a Rock. It has also made appearances involving Pittsburgh's sports teams, including by the Pittsburgh Pirates at PNC Park and used as bumper music by NBC whenever the Pittsburgh Steelers play on NBC Sunday Night Football.

== Album appearances ==
- Back on the Streets, 1980
- Out of the Blue, 1992
- Live! At Nick's Fat City, 1998 (live)
- Together Alone, 1999 (acoustic)
- 20th Century Masters: The Millennium Collection: The Best of Donnie Iris, 2001
- 25 Years, 2004 (live)
- Ah! Live!, 2009 (live)

== Cover versions ==
- Electric Six covered the song on their cover-album Mimicry and Memories (2015).
- Former Megadeth bassist David Ellefson along with Chip Z'Nuff (Enuff Z'Nuff), Stephen Shareaux (Kik Tracee), and Drew Fortier (The Lucid) covered the song as a single in late 2024.
