= Paul Goll =

American musician

Paul David Goll Jr. (born 1953) is an American rock guitarist and bass guitarist. Born in Erie, PA, he began playing bass guitar professionally at the age of 15.

Paul has been the bass guitarist for Donnie Iris and the Cruisers since 1994, and first appeared on the live album Live! At Nick's Fat City in 1998. Goll is the son of PFC Paul D. Goll Sr. (1921–1978). Goll lives in Asheville, North Carolina and has been married to Elizabeth Jane Elliot since 2012. Goll currently works at Mission Hospitals Olson Huff Center for children.
