= Rock Candy Records =

British record label

- Founded: 2005
- Founder: Derek Oliver, Dante Bonutto
- Status: Active
- Genre: Hard rock; AOR; glam metal; heavy metal
- Location: London, England
- Official website: rockcandyrecords.co.uk

Rock Candy Records is an independent record label based in the United Kingdom. Founded by ex-Kerrang! writers Derek Oliver and Dante Bonutto in 2005, the label primarily specializes in CD reissues of rock and heavy metal albums from the 1970s and 1980s. In 2017, Oliver co-founded a magazine affiliate of the label under the same name with Howard Johnson and Malcolm Dome.

The label takes its name from the Montrose song of the same name.

== Artists ==
Artists released by the company include Toto, RATT, Eddie Money, Survivor, Max Webster, Montrose, Malice and Rhino Bucket, among others.

== Magazine ==
In March 2017, Rock Candy Records launched their own music magazine. It is published bi-monthly, and covers material mostly regarding 1970s and 1980s hard rock.
