= Mark Avsec =

American musician

- Born: Mark Avsec; 23 August 1954 (age 71)
- Genres: Funk; funk rock; blue-eyed soul; disco; R&B
- Occupations: songwriter; musician; lawyer
- Instruments: Vocals; keyboards
- Years active: 1976–present
- Formerly of: Wild Cherry; Donnie Iris & the Cruisers

Mark Avsec (born August 23, 1954) is an American rock keyboardist, songwriter, and producer. He was a member of the funk rock band Wild Cherry.

Avsec was an original member of Donnie Iris & the Cruisers. He wrote or co-wrote all of the band's music, was its sole lyricist, and produced all of its albums.

Since 1995, he has also been a copyright lawyer.

== Biography ==
Avsec joined the band Wild Cherry immediately following the recording of the disco hit, "Play That Funky Music" (1976). He was brought in as a session keyboardist for two tracks on the band's debut album, and was then asked to join the group. He also toured with the band, performing "Afternoon Delight" at the 1976 Grammy Awards. During this period, he befriended Donnie Iris, with whom he composed Donnie Iris & The Cruisers' hits "Ah! Leah!" (#19 Billboard Mainstream Rock) and "Love Is Like a Rock" (#9 Billboard Mainstream Rock).

In 1980, Avsec wrote and produced the debut album for the band LaFlavour which garnered the hit single "Mandolay," climbing to number 7 on Billboard's Disco Chart. Avsec later released "Mandolay" himself under the artist name Art Attack. By the time Avsec composed LaFlavour's follow-up album, the band's label, MCA, had decided to change the band's name to "Fair Warning," due to interest in disco music tapering off. The lead-off Fair Warning single composed by Avsec was called "She Don't Know Me," which was taken by MCA from the Fair Warning debut album and given to New Jersey's Bon Jovi, who were preparing their debut album for PolyGram's Mercury label. The label felt Bon Jovi needed the song as a single, making Avsec the only outside songwriter to compose a song released by Bon Jovi that was not co-written by a member of the band. Avsec has played with other musicians such as Mason Ruffner and The James Gang featuring Joe Walsh, Jimmy Fox, and Dale Peters.

In addition to Donnie Iris & the Cruisers, Wild Cherry, and James Gang, Avsec was a member of the Cleveland, Ohio-based band, Breathless. He has also released material in collaboration with fellow Donnie Iris and the Cruisers member Kevin Valentine under the pseudonym Cellarful of Noise.

In 2010, "Angel Love (Come For Me)," a song Avsec co-wrote with Mason Ruffner and Alan Greene, was included on Carlos Santana's Supernatural (Legacy Edition) album.

Avsec decided to become a lawyer because he was frivolously sued for the song "Ah! Leah!" He won the lawsuit but lost all of the royalties defending himself. Today Avsec has a successful practice specializing in intellectual property law based in Cleveland, Ohio, having graduated from Cleveland-Marshall College of Law in 1994 magna cum laude.

Since 2003, Avsec has taught "Law of the Music Industry" at Case Western Reserve University School of Law, and he teaches "Representing the Musical Artist" through the Great Lakes Sports and Entertainment Law Academy, a program that Case Western Reserve University School of Law offers in affiliation with the Cleveland-Marshall College of Law.

== Discography ==
=== Wild Cherry ===
==== Studio albums ====
- Wild Cherry, 1976 (studio musician only)
- Electrified Funk, 1977
- I Love My Music, 1978
- Only the Wild Survive, 1979

==== Compilations ====
- Play the Funk, 2000
- Super Hits, 2002

=== Breathless ===
- Breathless, 1979
- Nobody Leaves This Song Alive, 1980

=== Donnie Iris and the Cruisers ===
==== Studio albums ====
- Back on the Streets, 1980
- King Cool, 1981
- The High and the Mighty, 1982
- Fortune 410, 1983
- No Muss...No Fuss, 1985
- Out of the Blue, 1992
- Footsoldier in the Moonlight, 1993
- Poletown, 1997
- Together Alone, 1999
- Ellwood City, 2006
- Ah! Leluiah!, 2010

==== Live albums ====
- Live! At Nick's Fat City, 1998
- Ah! Live!, 2009

==== Compilation albums ====
- 20th Century Masters: The Millennium Collection: The Best of Donnie Iris, 2001
- 25 Years, 2004

==== EP ====
- You Can't Really Miss Me If I Never Go Away, 2008

=== Cellarful of Noise ===
- Cellarful of Noise, 1985
- Magnificent Obsession, 1988
