= Albritton McClain =

American rock guitarist (born 1952)

Albritton McClain (born March 19, 1952) is an American rock guitarist who is best known for being a member of Donnie Iris and the Cruisers. McClain played the bass guitar on the band's early albums during the 1980s and on Poletown in 1997.
