= Kevin Valentine =

American drummer

- Genres: Glam metal, hard rock
- Occupations: Musician, sound mixer
- Instrument: Drums
- Formerly of: Donnie Iris and the Cruisers; Cinderella; Shadow King; The Innocent; Kiss

Kevin Kosec, known professionally as Kevin Valentine, is an American rock drummer who is best known for being a member of Donnie Iris and the Cruisers. Valentine played drums on all of the band's early albums during the 1980s. Valentine has recorded as a member of Breathless, The Innocent, Godz, Rosie, Shadow King, The Lou Gramm Band and Neverland. He also performed (on a session basis) on the Kiss albums Hot In The Shade, Revenge and Psycho Circus, playing on all tracks but one on Psycho Circus. The one track he did not play was "Into the Void", performed by Peter Criss. On Revenge, he played on one song, "Take It Off" and played on "You Love Me to Hate You" and "King Of Hearts" on Hot in the Shade. He was also a touring member of Cinderella. Valentine is also a sound mixer for many prominent TV shows, such as The Good Wife, Legion, Better Call Saul, El Camino: A Breaking Bad Movie, Ozark, and The Nevers.

== Discography ==
=== With Todd Tamanend Clark ===
- Two Thousand Light Years From Home (1975)

=== With Breathless ===
- Breathless (1979)
- Nobody Leaves This Song Alive (1980)
- The Best Of Breathless · Picture This (1993)

=== With Rosie ===
- Live (1988)

=== With Donnie Iris and the Cruisers ===
- Back on the Streets (1980)
- King Cool (1981)
- The High and the Mighty (1982)
- Fortune 410 (1983)
- No Muss...No Fuss (1985)
- Out of the Blue (1992)
- Poletown (1997)
- 20th Century Masters: The Best of Donnie Iris (2001)
- 25 Years (2004)
- Ellwood City (2006)

=== With Kiss ===
- Hot In The Shade (1989) Drums on "You Love Me to Hate You" and "King of Hearts"
- Revenge (1992) Drums on "Take It Off"
- Psycho Circus (1998) All drums except for the song "Into The Void"

=== With The Innocent ===
- Livin' In The Street (1985)

=== With Godz ===
- Mongolians (1987)

=== With Shadow King ===
- Shadow King (1991)
- Highlander II · The Quickening (soundtrack) (1991)

=== With Neverland ===
- Surreal World (1996)

=== With Graham Bonnet ===
- Underground (1997)
- The Day I Went Mad (1999)

== Awards and nominations ==
Year	Association	Category	Work	Result	Ref.
2015	Primetime Creative Arts Emmy Awards	Primetime Emmy Award for Outstanding Sound Mixing for a Comedy or Drama Series (One-Hour)	Better Call Saul – "Marco"	Nominated	
2016	Primetime Creative Arts Emmy Awards	Primetime Emmy Award for Outstanding Sound Mixing for a Comedy or Drama Series (One-Hour)	Better Call Saul – "Klick"	Nominated	
2017	Primetime Creative Arts Emmy Awards	Primetime Emmy Award for Outstanding Sound Mixing for a Comedy or Drama Series (One-Hour)	Better Call Saul – "Witness"	Nominated	
2019	Primetime Creative Arts Emmy Awards	Primetime Emmy Award for Outstanding Sound Mixing for a Comedy or Drama Series (One-Hour)	Better Call Saul – "Talk"	Nominated	
2019	Primetime Creative Arts Emmy Awards	Primetime Emmy Award for Outstanding Sound Mixing for a Comedy or Drama Series (One-Hour)	Ozark – "The Badger"	Nominated	
2020	Primetime Creative Arts Emmy Awards	Primetime Emmy Award for Outstanding Sound Mixing for a Comedy or Drama Series (One-Hour)	Better Call Saul – "Bagman"	Nominated	
2020	Primetime Creative Arts Emmy Awards	Primetime Emmy Award for Outstanding Sound Mixing for a Comedy or Drama Series (One-Hour)	Ozark – "All In"	Nominated	
2020	Primetime Creative Arts Emmy Awards	Primetime Emmy Award for Outstanding Sound Mixing for a Limited Series or Movie	El Camino: A Breaking Bad Movie	Nominated	
2022	Primetime Creative Arts Emmy Awards	Primetime Emmy Award for Outstanding Sound Mixing for a Comedy or Drama Series (One-Hour)	Better Call Saul – "Carrot and Stick"	Nominated	
2022	Primetime Creative Arts Emmy Awards	Primetime Emmy Award for Outstanding Sound Mixing for a Comedy or Drama Series (One-Hour)	Ozark – "Sanctified"	Nominated	
