= Marty Lee Hoenes =

American rock musician

Marty Lee Hoenes is an American rock musician who is best known as the lead guitarist for the Donnie Iris and the Cruisers. He is also a freelance artist and designer, having designed many of the band's albums. He currently resides in North Canton, Ohio with his wife and daughter.
