= Forever by Your Side =

Forever by Your Side may refer to:

- "Forever by Your Side" (song), a 1983 song by The Manhattans
- Forever by Your Side (album), a 1983 album by The Manhattans
