= Crazy (The Manhattans song) =

Single by The Manhattans

from the album Forever by Your Side
- B-side: "Love Is Gonna Find You"
- Released: June 1983
- Recorded: 1983
- Genre: Soul; R&B
- Length: 4:52 (Album full version); 3:55 (7" Single version)
- Label: Columbia Records
- Songwriters: John V. Anderson; Steve Williams; Steve Horton
- Producers: John V. Anderson; Steve Williams

The Manhattans singles chronology
"Honey, Honey" (1982)	"Crazy" (1983)	"Forever by Your Side" (1983)

Music video
- "Crazy" (Official Music Video) on YouTube

"Crazy" is a song written and produced by the Americans songwriters and music producers John V. Anderson, Steve Williams and Steve Horton. The song was recorded in 1983 by popular American R&B vocal group The Manhattans and released the same year on the album Forever by Your Side by Columbia Records. "Crazy" was released as a single in June 1983, reaching No. 4 on the R&B chart, and No. 72 on the Billboard Hot 100. Besides the United States, "Crazy" peaked at No. 63 on the UK Singles chart. Two formats were released for the single of "Crazy". The first was 7" single, where "Crazy" was only 3:55 in length and containing the song "Love Is Gonna Find You" on B-side. The second was 12" single, containing the instrumental version of "Crazy" on B-side.

"Crazy" was followed later in 1983 by a second single, the title track "Forever by Your Side", which was successful in Brazil in 1985.

== Chart positions ==
=== Weekly charts ===
Chart (1983)	Peak position
US Top 100 Black Singles (Cash Box)	3
US Hot R&B/Hip-Hop Songs (Billboard)	4
UK Singles Chart (Official Charts)	63
US The Hot 100 (Billboard)	72
US Top 100 Singles (Cash Box)	76

=== Year-end charts ===
Chart (1983)	Position
USA Top 100 Black Singles (Cash Box)	48

== Track listing ==
=== 7" Single ===
Side	Song	Length	Interpreters	Writer/composer	Producers	Original album	Recording year
A-side	"Crazy"	3:55*	The Manhattans	John V. Anderson, Steve Williams, Steve Horton	John V. Anderson, Steve Williams	Forever by Your Side	1983
B-side	"Love Is Gonna Find You"	4:55	The Manhattans	Leo Graham, Paul Richmond	Leo Graham	Forever by Your Side	1983

- The full length of "Crazy" on the album Forever by Your Side is 4:52. The length of 3:55 on the 7" single is an edited version of the song.

=== 12" Single ===
Side	Song	Length	Interpreters	Writer/composer	Producers	Original album	Recording year
A-side	"Crazy"	5:00	The Manhattans	John V. Anderson, Steve Williams, Steve Horton	John V. Anderson, Steve Williams	Forever by Your Side	1983
B-side	"Crazy" (Instrumental)	5:00	The Manhattans	John V. Anderson, Steve Williams, Steve Horton	John V. Anderson, Steve Williams	Non-album single*	1983

- The instrumental version of "Crazy" present on the B-side of the 12" single was not included in the original 1983 LP Forever by Your Side.

== Music video ==
"Crazy" has an official music video, recorded by The Manhattans in 1983. The video shows New York City and its buildings at night, the city illuminated by lights. The Manhattans sing "Crazy" in a club, wearing white suits and black pants, making gestures and dancing to the choreography of the song. The video also shows images of couples and at a later time, four women appear dancing on the stage where the Manhattans sing.

== B-side ==
The B-side of the 7" single contains the song "Love Is Gonna Find You", which was also recorded by The Manhattans in 1983 for the album Forever by Your Side. It was written by the songwriters and musicians Leo Graham and Paul Richmond, and produced by Leo Graham. It was a simple song from their album that was not released as a single.

== Personnel ==
- Lead Vocal – Gerald Alston
- Backing Vocals – Winfred "Blue" Lovett, Edward "Sonny" Bivins, Kenneth "Wally" Kelly
- Writers: John V. Anderson, Steve Williams, Steve Horton
- Producers: John V. Anderson, Steve Williams
- Executive Producers: Morrie Brown
- Drum Programming (Linn): John V. Anderson, Steve Williams
- Drums: Leslie Ming
- Electric Bass: Wayne Brathwaite
- Electric Piano (Rhodes): John V. Anderson
- Guitar: Steve Williams
- Keyboards: John V. Anderson
- Piano: John V. Anderson
- Synthesizer (Moog): John V. Anderson
