= Larry Gottlieb =

American songwriter (born 1951)

- Birth name: Lawrence Bennett Gottlieb
- Born: June 10, 1951 (age 74); Jackson Heights, Queens, New York
- Origin: Manhasset, New York, United States
- Genres: Country, rhythm and blues, pop
- Occupation: Singer-songwriter
- Instrument(s): Guitar, piano
- Years active: 1973–present

Lawrence Bennett Gottlieb (born June 10, 1951, in Jackson Heights, New York, United States) is an American songwriter.

Gottlieb has penned songs for Trisha Yearwood, Kim Richey and Kevin Montgomery, as well as penning Blue Öyster Cult's "Dancin' in the Ruins" with Jason Scanlon. The song came to BÖC through the publisher, and was recorded for "Club Ninja." Gottlieb has been nominated for two Grammy Awards: the first in 1982 (with Marc Blatte) for Best R&B Song, with "When She Was My Girl", performed by the Four Tops, and the second in 1997 (with Angelo Petraglia and Kim Richey) for Best Country Song, with "Believe Me Baby (I Lied)", performed by Trisha Yearwood.

== Discography ==
=== Songwriting ===
Year	Artist	Song	Album	Collaborator(s)
1975	The Main Ingredient	"Family Man"		
1976	The Tymes	"Goin' Through the Motions"		
1978	The Debs	"Cupie Dolls"		Marc Blatte
1978	The Debs	"Oh Woman"		Marc Blatte
1980	Patti Fisher	"Shiver"		Marc Blatte
1981	Four Tops	"When She Was My Girl"	Tonight!	Marc Blatte
1982	Four Tops	"Sad Hearts"	One More Mountain	Marc Blatte
1982	Rachel Sweet	"Voo Doo"	& Then He Kissed Me: Blame It on Love	Marc Blatte
1983	The Manhattans	"Forever By Your Side"	Forever By Your Side	Marc Blatte
1983	The Rake	"Street Justice"		Marc Blatte & Jay Rifkin
1984	Dominique	"Changes Of Heart"		Marc Blatte
1984	Laura Branigan	"Sharpshooter"	Body Rock	Marc Blatte
1985	The Manhattans	"Too Hot To Stop It"	Too Hot To Stop It	Marc Blatte & Larry Wu (Larry Wedgeworth)
1986	Marie Osmond	"Read My Lips"	There's No Stopping Your Heart	Marc Blatte
1986	Kenny Rogers & Nickie Ryder	"The Pride is Back"	Through The Years: A Retrospective	Marc Blatte & Alan Monde
1986	Blue Öyster Cult	"Dancin' in the Ruins"	Club Ninja	Jason Scanlon
1986	Joe Cerisano	"Hands Across America" (theme song of the Hands Across America benefit event)		Marc Blatte & John Carney
1988	Joe Trio	"Take Me Home"		Marc Blatte & Patti Harney
1992	Pirates of the Mississippi	"Till I'm Holding You Again"	Walk the Plank	Bill McCorvey & Rich Alves
1993	Kevin Montgomery	"Red-Blooded American Boy"	Fear Nothing	
1993	Kevin Montgomery	"Everybody's Girl"	Fear Nothing	
1993	Kevin Montgomery	"Code of Honor"	Fear Nothing	
1993	Kevin Montgomery	"I Won't Close My Eyes"	Fear Nothing	
1993	Kevin Montgomery	"Which Way Is It Gonna Be"	Fear Nothing	
1993	Kevin Montgomery	"I Want You"	Fear Nothing	
1993	Kevin Montgomery	"Fear Nothing"	Fear Nothing	
1993	Kevin Montgomery	"Softer Years"	Fear Nothing	
1993	Kevin Montgomery	"Don't Make Me Hate the Things I Love"	Fear Nothing	
1996	Trisha Yearwood	"Believe Me Baby (I Lied)"	Everybody Knows	Kim Richey & Angelo Petraglia
1997	Martina McBride	"I Won't Close My Eyes"	Evolution	Kevin Montgomery
1997	Kim Richey	"I'm Alright"	Bitter Sweet	Kim Richey & Angelo Petraglia
1997	Kim Richey	"To Tell the Truth"	Bitter Sweet	Kim Richey & Angelo Petraglia
1997	Kim Richey	"The Lonesome Side of Town"	Bitter Sweet	Kim Richey & Angelo Petraglia
2001	Bill Deasy	"Good Things are Happening" (the Good Morning America theme song until October 22, 2007)		Bill Deasy
2003	Kevin Montgomery	"Another Long Story"	Another Long Story	
2004	Kevin Montgomery	"Melrose"	2:30 am	
2004	Kevin Montgomery	"She Don't Wake Me Up"	2:30 am	
2004	Kevin Montgomery	"Thank You Very Much"	2:30 am	
