= There's No Me Without You =

Studio album by the Manhattans
- Released: 1973
- Studio: Sigma Sound, Philadelphia; Columbia 30th Street, New York City
- Genre: Soul, R&B
- Label: Columbia
- Producer: Bobby Martin

The Manhattans chronology
A Million to One (1972)	There's No Me Without You (1973)	That's How Much I Love You (1974)

Professional ratings
Review scores
Source	Rating
AllMusic	3/5 stars
The Encyclopedia of Popular Music	3/5 stars
The New Rolling Stone Record Guide	4/5 stars

There's No Me Without You is the fifth studio album by the American vocal group the Manhattans, released in 1973 through Columbia Records.

== Chart performance ==
The album peaked at No. 19 on the R&B albums chart. It reached No. 150 on the Billboard 200. The title track peaked at No. 3 on the Hot Soul Singles chart and No. 43 on the Billboard Hot 100. "You'd Better Believe It" charted at No. 18 on the Hot Soul Singles chart and No. 77 on the Billboard Hot 100. "Wish That You Were Mine" reached No. 19 on the Hot Soul Singles chart.

== Track listing ==
Side one
No.	Title	Writer(s)	Length
1.	"There's No Me Without You"	Edward Bivins	3:38
2.	"We Made It"	Winfred Lovett	4:13
3.	"Wish That You Were Mine"	Winfred Lovett	4:17
4.	"I'm Not a Run Around"	Teddy Randazzo, Roger Joyce	3:14
5.	"Soul Train"	Winfred Lovett, Little Harlem	4:40

Side two
No.	Title	Writer(s)	Length
1.	"You'd Better Believe It"	John Fowlkes, Roger Genger	4:26
2.	"It's So Hard Loving You"	Charles Reed	2:30
3.	"The Day the Robin Sang to Me"	Kenneth Kelly	3:43
4.	"Falling Apart at the Seams"	Teddy Randazzo, Victoria Pike, Souren Mozian	2:17
5.	"The Other Side of Me"	Gerald Alston, Winfred Lovett	3:09

== Personnel ==
- Norman Harris, Bobby Eli, Roland Chambers – guitar
- Lenny Pakula – organ
- Vincent Montana Jr. – vibraphone
- Ronnie Baker – bass
- Earl Young – drums
- Larry Washington – congas
- Don Renaldo – horn and string section

== Charts ==
Album

Chart (1973)	Peaks
U.S. Billboard Top LPs	150
U.S. Billboard Top Soul LPs	19

Singles

Year	Single	Peaks	
Year	Single	US	US R&B
1973	"There's No Me Without You"	43	3
1973	"You'd Better Believe It"	77	18
1973	"Wish That You Were Mine"	—	19
