= After Midnight (The Manhattans album) =

Studio album by the Manhattans
- Released: 1980
- Recorded: 1979–1980
- Studio: Universal, Chicago, Illinois; Jennifudy Studios, North Hollywood, California; Penny Lane, New York City, New York; Mediasound, New York City, New York; Sigma Sound, Philadelphia, Pennsylvania
- Genre: Soul, R&B
- Label: Columbia
- Producer: Leo Graham, Dennis Lambert, Brian Potter, Bert deCoteaux, Norman Harris, Manhattan Productions, Inc., Scorpicorn Music, Inc.

The Manhattans chronology
Love Talk (1979)	After Midnight (1980)	Black Tie (1981)

Professional ratings
Review scores
Source	Rating
AllMusic	4.5/5 stars
The Rolling Stone Album Guide	3/5 stars

After Midnight is the eleventh studio album by American vocal group the Manhattans, released in 1980 through Columbia Records.

== Reception ==
The album peaked at No. 4 on the R&B albums chart. It also reached No. 24 on the Billboard 200. The album features the singles "Shining Star", which peaked at No. 4 on the Hot Soul Singles chart and No. 5 on the Billboard Hot 100, and "Girl of My Dream", which reached No. 30 on the Hot Soul Singles chart. This album has been Certified Gold by the R.I.A.A.

== Track listing ==
Side one
No.	Title	Writer(s)	Length
1.	"Shining Star"	Leo Graham, Paul Richmond	4:40
2.	"It's Not the Same"	Leo Graham, Paul Richmond, Darryl Ellis, Ruben Locke Jr.	4:40
3.	"Girl of My Dream"	Leo Graham, James Mack	5:00
4.	"Cloudy, with a Chance of Tears"	Estelle Levitt, Jerry Ragovoy	4:48
5.	"The Closer You Are"	Kenneth Kelly, Winfred Lovett, Edward Bivins, Gerald Alston	3:19

Side two
No.	Title	Writer(s)	Length
1.	"If My Heart Could Speak" / "One Life to Live" (Medley)	Kenneth Kelly, Eddie Jones / Winfred Lovett	5:35
2.	"Just as Long as I Have You"	Winfred Lovett	3:50
3.	"It Couldn't Hurt"	Dennis Lambert, Brian Potter	4:49
4.	"Tired of the Single Life"	Robert Riley Sr.	4:00
5.	"I'll Never Run Away from Love Again"	Gerald Alston, Barbara Morr	3:45

== Charts ==
=== Weekly charts ===
Chart (1980)	Peak position
US Billboard 200	24
US Top R&B/Hip-Hop Albums (Billboard)	4

=== Year-end charts ===
Chart (1980)	Position
US Billboard 200	74
US Top R&B/Hip-Hop Albums (Billboard)	20

=== Singles ===
Year	Single	Peaks		
Year	Single	US	US R&B	US A/C
1980	"Shining Star"	5	4	21
1980	"Girl of My Dream"	—	30	—
