= Black tie (disambiguation) =

Black tie is a semi-formal dress code.

Black tie may also refer to:

== Music ==
- "Black Tie", 1986 song by Yellowjackets from Shades
- Black Tie (album)
- Black Tie (band)

== Television ==
- "Black Tie", a 1993 episode of Law & Order Season 4
- "Black Tie" (30 Rock), a 2007 episode from the first season of 30 Rock

== See also ==
- Black Ties, a 2020 Australian/New Zealand play
