= Sam Dees =

American singer (born 1945)

- Born: Sam Dees; December 17, 1945 (age 80)
- Origin: Birmingham, Alabama, United States
- Genres: R&B, funk, soul
- Occupations: Musician, songwriter, singer, producer
- Instruments: Vocals, scatting, keyboard
- Years active: 1968–present
- Labels: Lolo Records, Chess Records, Atlantic Records, Ardent Records, Kent Records

Sam Dees (born December 17, 1945) is an American soul singer, songwriter and record producer. He has released several albums throughout the 1970s, 1980s, and the 1990s; as a composer, he has written hundreds of songs for many music artists.

== Early life ==
Sam Dees was born in Birmingham, Alabama, United States, into a large family and distinguished himself with his voice. At the age of nine, and already champion of several singing contests, he founded his own vocal group, the Bossanovians.

== Music career ==
As a teenager he traveled to perform and, in 1968 he recorded his first single at Nashville, Tennessee's SSS International. He released his next few singles on Lolo Records. Chess Records producer, Lenny Sachs, gave him an opportunity to self-produce two singles on the Chess label, which Dees recorded in a former church in Birmingham. From there, he began recording for Atlantic, which released his landmark album, The Show Must Go On in 1975.

== Songwriter ==
Since then, Dees recording career stalled while he wrote hits for other singers, such as "Am I Dreaming" (Atlantic Starr), "One in a Million You" (Larry Graham), "Save the Overtime (For Me)" (Gladys Knight & the Pips), "Love All the Hurt Away" (George Benson and Aretha Franklin), and "Lover for Life" (Whitney Houston).

Dees also wrote the song "Just the Lonely Talking Again", which was originally recorded by the American R&B vocal group The Manhattans on their 1983 album Forever By Your Side, and later recorded by Whitney Houston in 1987 on her second studio album, Whitney.

He released a solo single titled "After All" in 1989, and the accompanying album, Secret Admirer, was not successful.

Dees continues to write and produce. He released recordings on his own Pen Pad label and also recorded for Ardent Records in England, not to be confused with Ardent Records of Memphis, Tennessee. Another English label, Kent Records, has released early recordings. Other previously unissued recordings from the early 1970s are planned for release by Selecta Records, whose parent company Millbrand Music control the copyrights to many of Dees' early songs.

His song "Lonely for You Baby" was used and referenced in the British surf movie, Blue Juice (1995).

== Solo discography ==
=== Studio albums ===
- The Show Must Go On (1975) - (reissued 2012)
- Secret Admirer (1989)
- The Homecomings (EP) (1991)
- Cry to Me: Deep and Mellow Soul of Sam Dees (1994)
- Second to None (1995)
- Gospel Tribute (1997)
- Sam Dees (1997)
- Lovers Do (Pen Pad, 1998)
- The Heritage of a Black Man (1998)

== Songwriter credits ==
=== Songs ===
- "One in a Million You" (Larry Graham)
- "So Can I" (Loleatta Holloway)
- "Am I Dreaming" (Atlantic Starr)
- "Send for Me" (Atlantic Starr)
- "More, More, More" (Atlantic Starr)
- "All in the Name of Love" (Atlantic Starr)
- "Save the Overtime (For Me)" (Gladys Knight)
- "Love All the Hurt Away" (Aretha Franklin)
- "Just the Lonely Talking Again" (The Manhattans in 1983, and later Whitney Houston in 1987)
- "Lover for Life" (Whitney Houston)
- "After the Love Has Lost Its Shine" (Regina Belle)
- "Mess on Your Hands" (Millie Jackson)
- "Let Me Heal the Bruises" (Tavares)
- "Games, Games" (Tavares)
- "My Love Calls" (Tavares)
- "Where Did We Go Wrong" (L.T.D.)
