= That's How Much I Love You =

Studio album by the Manhattans
- Released: 1974
- Studio: Sigma Sound, Philadelphia, Pennsylvania
- Genre: Soul; rhythm and blues
- Label: Columbia
- Producer: The Manhattans Productions, Inc., Bobby Martin

The Manhattans chronology
There's No Me Without You (1973)	That's How Much I Love You (1974)	The Manhattans (1976)

Professional ratings
Review scores
Source	Rating
AllMusic	3/5 stars

That's How Much I Love You is the sixth studio album by American vocal group the Manhattans, released in 1974 through Columbia Records.

== Reception ==
The album peaked at No. 59 on the R&B albums chart. It also reached No. 160 on the Billboard 200. The album features the singles "Don't Take Your Love", which peaked at No. 7 on the Hot Soul Singles chart and No. 37 on the Billboard Hot 100, and "Summertime in the City", which reached No. 45 on the Hot Soul Singles chart.

== Track listing ==
Side one
No.	Title	Writer(s)	Length
1.	"Summertime in the City"	Winfred Lovett	4:50
2.	"Don't Take Your Love From Me"	Allan Felder, Bunny Sigler, Ron Kersey	3:28
3.	"Save Our Goodbyes"	Teddy Randazzo, Victoria Pike, Iran Koster	3:11
4.	"I Don't Want to Pay the Price of Losing You"	Teddy Randazzo, Victoria Pike, Souren Mozian	3:14
5.	"That's How Much I Love You"	Allan Felder, Bunny Sigler, Norman Harris	2:57

Side two
No.	Title	Writer(s)	Length
1.	"Blackbird"	Ronnie Hayes	3:03
2.	"A Change Is Gonna Come"	Sam Cooke	4:17
3.	"Strange Old World"	Richard Taylor	2:10
4.	"Fever"	John Davenport, Eddie Cooley	3:04
5.	"Nursery Rhymes"	Winfred Lovett	3:29

== Personnel ==
- Norman Harris, Bobby Eli – guitar
- Ron Kersey – piano
- Vincent Montana Jr. – vibraphone
- Ronnie Baker – bass
- Earl Young – drums
- Larry Washington – congas
- Don Renaldo – horn and string section

== Charts ==
Album

Chart (1974)	Peaks
U.S. Billboard Top LPs	160
U.S. Billboard Top Soul LPs	59

Singles

Year	Single	Peaks	
Year	Single	US	US R&B
1974	"Summertime in the City"	—	45
1974	"Don't Take Your Love"	37	7
