= Dancin' in the Ruins =

1985 song by Blue Öyster Cult

Single by Blue Öyster Cult

from the album Club Ninja
- B-side: "Shadow Warrior"
- Released: 1986
- Length: 3:58
- Label: Columbia
- Songwriter(s): Larry Gottlieb; Justin Scanlon
- Producer(s): Sandy Pearlman

Blue Öyster Cult singles chronology
"White Flags" (1985)	"Dancin' in the Ruins" (1986)	"Perfect Water" (1986)

Music video
- "Dancin' in the Ruins" on YouTube

"Dancin' in the Ruins" is a song by American rock band Blue Öyster Cult, released in 1986 as the second single from their tenth studio album, Club Ninja (1985). The song was written by Larry Gottlieb and Justin Scanlon, and produced by Sandy Pearlman. It peaked at number 9 on the US Billboard Top Rock Tracks chart.

== Background ==
According to guitarist and vocalist Buck Dharma, although the song was written by outside writers, the band recorded it as it sounded "very plausibly a Blue Öyster Cult song". Dharma also attributed the song's eventual loss of radio play to the media's attention on the ongoing payola scandal. At the time, CBS, the parent company of the band's label Columbia Records, ceased supporting their independent promoters, causing a number of CBS releases to suffer airplay losses.

== Music video ==
The song's music video was directed by Frances Dilea and produced by the Wolfe Company. It debuted on MTV on February 22, 1986, and went on to achieve power rotation on the channel. Bassist Joe Bouchard later recalled, "I thought it was kind of cheesy actually. It pulled the whole thing from the creative team. We spent some heavy dollars on making that video but it was never played much on MTV."

== Critical reception ==
Upon its release as a single, Billboard described "Dancin' in the Ruins" as "accessible hard rock" and felt it was "reminiscent" of the band's 1981 hit "Burnin' for You". Dave Sholin, writing for the Gavin Report, commented that, 10 years after the success of "(Don't Fear) The Reaper", the band "has turned out yet another piece of music for the masses". He added, "If you haven't checked it out yet, you're in for a pleasant surprise." FMQB felt the song was "destined to rule [radio] as the companion piece" to "(Don't Fear) The Reaper". They added, "Remember when the Cult was considered too rough for full time radio play? Little did we know they were really popsters on petrol."

Alvie Lindsay, writing for the Fresno Bee, noted that the song "reflects a change in the group's direction towards a more danceable, sing-along style". Martin Popoff, in his 2004 book Blue Oyster Cult: Secrets Revealed!, called it a "direct descendant" of "Burnin' for You" that is "full of Buck's pop wonderment", with "more hooks than a fishing tackle box". He also noted that it was a "desperate shot at another hit single" for which the band had to "surrender their creativity to produce it".

== Track listing ==
7–inch single (US, Canada, Europe and Australia)

1. "Dancin' in the Ruins" – 3:58
2. "Shadow Warrior" – 5:40

12–inch single (Europe)

1. "Dancin' in the Ruins" – 3:58
2. "Shadow Warrior" – 5:40

== Personnel ==
Blue Öyster Cult

- Eric Bloom – guitar, backing vocals
- Donald "Buck Dharma" Roeser – lead vocals, guitar
- Joe Bouchard – bass, guitar, backing vocals
- Tommy Zvoncheck – keyboards
- Jimmy Wilcox – percussion, backing vocals

Production

- Sandy Pearlman – production

== Charts ==
Chart (1986)	Peak position
US Billboard Top Rock Tracks	9
