= Whitney (album) =

Studio album by Whitney Houston
- Released: June 1, 1987
- Recorded: September 1986–March 1987
- Studios: Clinton Recording (New York City); Devonshire (Los Angeles); Hitsville U.S.A. (Hollywood); Larrabee East (Los Angeles); Leed's L'Mobile (Los Angeles); New Music Group, (Stamford); Ocean Way, (Hollywood); Right Track (NYC); Sigma Sound (NYC); Sound Track (NYC); Soundworks Digital (NYC); Tarpan (San Rafael); Hit Factory (NYC); The Plant (Sausalito); Z Studios (NYC)
- Genres: Pop; dance; R&B
- Length: 52:48
- Label: Arista
- Producers: Narada Michael Walden; Michael Masser; Jellybean Benitez; Kashif

Whitney Houston chronology
Whitney Dancin' Special (1986)	Whitney (1987)	I'm Your Baby Tonight (1990)

Singles from Whitney
- 1. "I Wanna Dance with Somebody (Who Loves Me)" Released: April 27, 1987; 2. "Didn't We Almost Have It All" Released: July 1987; 3. "So Emotional" Released: October 12, 1987; 4. "Where Do Broken Hearts Go" Released: February 15, 1988; 5. "Love Will Save the Day" Released: May 10, 1988; 6. "I Know Him So Well" Released: November 30, 1988 (EU)

Whitney is the second studio album by American singer Whitney Houston. It was released on June 1, 1987, by Arista Records. The follow-up to her debut album, production on the album aimed at reaching the same audience as her debut, which also mostly featured ballads and love songs while including several upbeat songs. Mostly produced by Narada Michael Walden and Michael Masser, with contributions from Kashif and John "Jellybean" Benitez, and featuring guest output from musicians such as Kenny G Roy Ayers and Premik Russell Tubbs, the album became an immediate hit upon its release.

In the United States, the album became the first by a female artist in Billboard 200 history to debut at number one on the chart and the fifth album to accomplish this. It spent eleven weeks atop the chart, marking the first time since Stevie Wonder's Songs in the Key of Life that an album lingered atop the chart after its debut. Along with her debut topping the charts for 14 weeks, Houston set a 1980s chart record for a woman by accumulating 25 weeks at number one on the Billboard 200. Internationally, the album topped the record charts in thirteen other countries including the United Kingdom, Australia, New Zealand, Japan, Canada, Germany, and several countries throughout Europe, while also finding success in Asia, South America and Africa, becoming a global success. In addition, it was the first album by a solo black female artist to top the albums chart in the United Kingdom. It has sold an estimated 20 million copies worldwide, becoming one of the best-selling albums of all time.

In the US, the album spawned five top ten singles on the Billboard Hot 100, all of which became international hit singles. The album's first four singles—"I Wanna Dance with Somebody (Who Loves Me)", "Didn't We Almost Have It All", "So Emotional" and "Where Do Broken Hearts Go"—all peaked at number one on the chart, breaking a record Houston set with her previous album, making her the first female artist to score four number one singles off from one album. Along with three straight number one singles from Houston's debut, the latter four helped Houston to earn an all-time chart record of seven consecutive number one singles on the Billboard Hot 100, a record the singer maintains. The album's fifth single, "Love Will Save the Day", reached the top ten on the same chart, while a sixth single, a cover of "I Know Him So Well", a duet sung with mother Cissy Houston, became a European market-only release in late 1988.

The album won Houston several industry awards including two NARM Awards, four American Music Awards, a Soul Train Music Award and four Grammy Award nominations including Album of the Year at the 30th Annual Grammy Awards while the album's hit single "I Wanna Dance with Somebody (Who Loves Me)" won the Grammy for Best Pop Vocal Performance, Female. In October 2020, Houston set another sales record when the album was certified diamond by the Recording Industry Association of America, for sales of over 10 million copies in the United States, making her the first black artist to score three diamond albums in the United States.

== Background ==
While she was a background vocalist for mother Cissy Houston, Whitney Houston was discovered by Arista Records CEO Clive Davis after viewing her performance of songs such as "Home", "Tomorrow" and "The Greatest Love of All" at a Manhattan jazz club. He then signed her to an exclusive contract with Arista and enlisted record producers such as Kashif, Jermaine Jackson, Michael Masser and Narada Michael Walden to produce her first album.

After over a year in recording sessions, Houston released her self-titled debut album on Valentine's Day, February 14, 1985 to critical and commercial success: it received five Grammy Award nominations at the 28th Annual Grammy Awards, including Album of the Year and Record of the Year, for "Greatest Love of All", with Houston winning her first Grammy for Best Female Pop Vocal Performance, for "Saving All My Love for You". The album topped the Billboard 200 for 14 weeks and was the best-selling album of 1986 in the United States, where it was certified 14 times platinum by the Recording Industry Association of America (RIAA), with estimated global sales of 25 million copies. Four of its singles — "You Give Good Love", "Saving All My Love for You", "How Will I Know" and "Greatest Love of All" — all peaked inside the US top 5, with the latter three all going to number one on the Billboard Hot 100, the first female artist to reach that feat.

By the summer of 1986, Houston had become a global superstar, breaking racial barriers for black women in pop music. That July, she embarked on her first headlining global tour, The Greatest Love World Tour, where she performed in four continents, including the United States, Europe, Oceania (Australia) and Asia. Prior to the tour, Clive Davis was anxious to keep Houston's momentum going and began assembling songs for the artist's next album, which he had initially planned for a September 1986 release, but the continued success of Houston's debut forced Davis to change his plans.

As Houston performed before audiences on her tour, Davis sought to have Houston's image changed somewhat after the singer was gaining a reputation for singing love ballads that went well beyond her age range. The plan was for Houston to have more uptempo material, similar to contemporaries such as Madonna and Janet Jackson. Davis also sought to have fewer duets on the album as he felt this album had to be more of a solitary affair; as a result, when American singer Michael Jackson offered Davis a duet he was working on titled "I Just Can't Stop Loving You" with Houston on his then-upcoming Bad album, Davis turned him down, fearing the song "might detract from promotion of the sophomore album".

Davis, however, decided not to change much of the pattern with its song material and producers as previous collaborators such as Michael Masser and Kashif returned, as well as Narada Michael Walden, who would end up producing the bulk of the recordings on the sophomore album; Walden recalls that he was given most of the songs to produce due to how quick "How Will I Know" had been produced. The sole new collaborator on the album was dance producer John "Jellybean" Benitez, who produced a remix on Houston's previous hit, "How Will I Know", and had been known for producing some of Madonna's hits.

== Recording ==
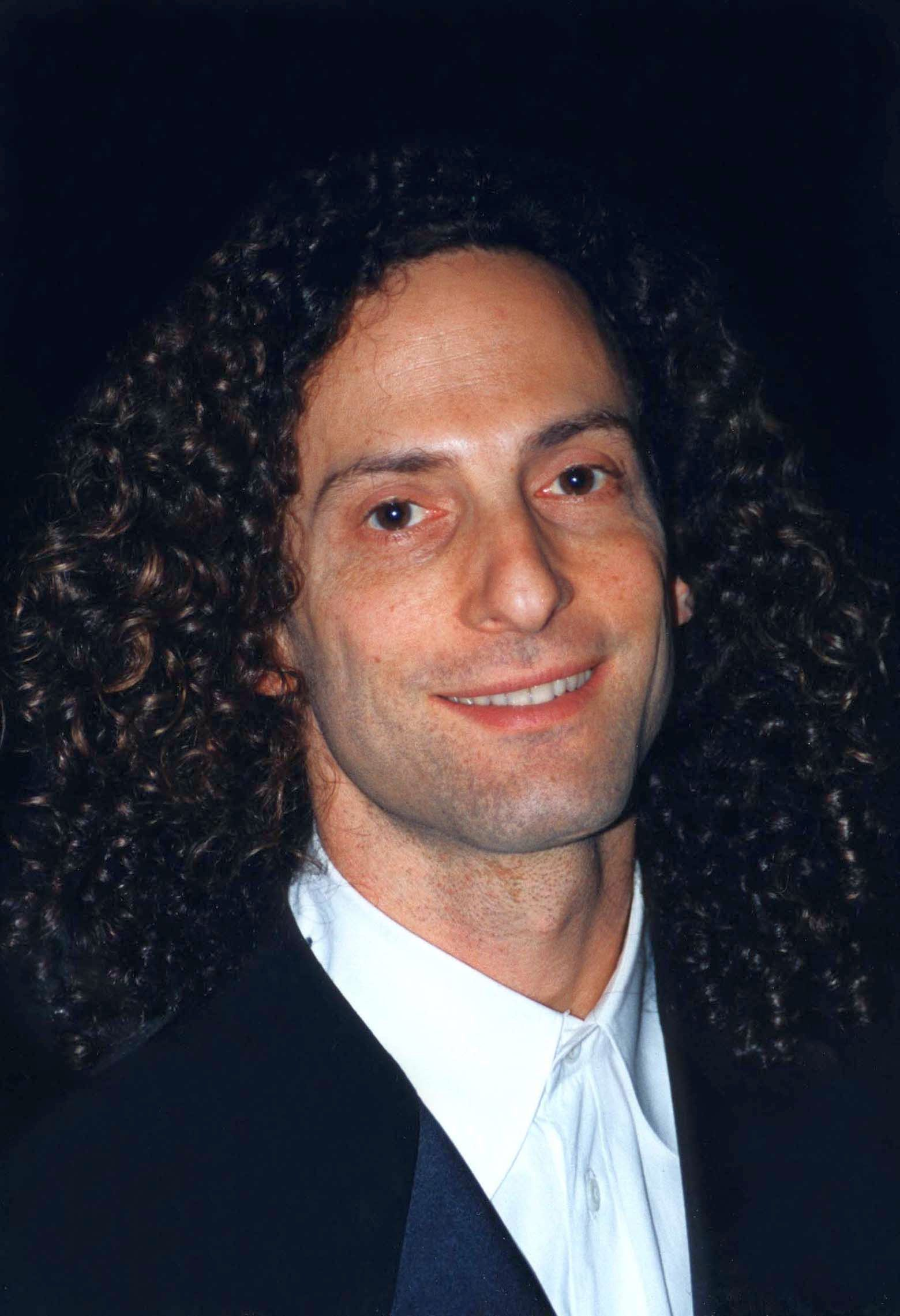
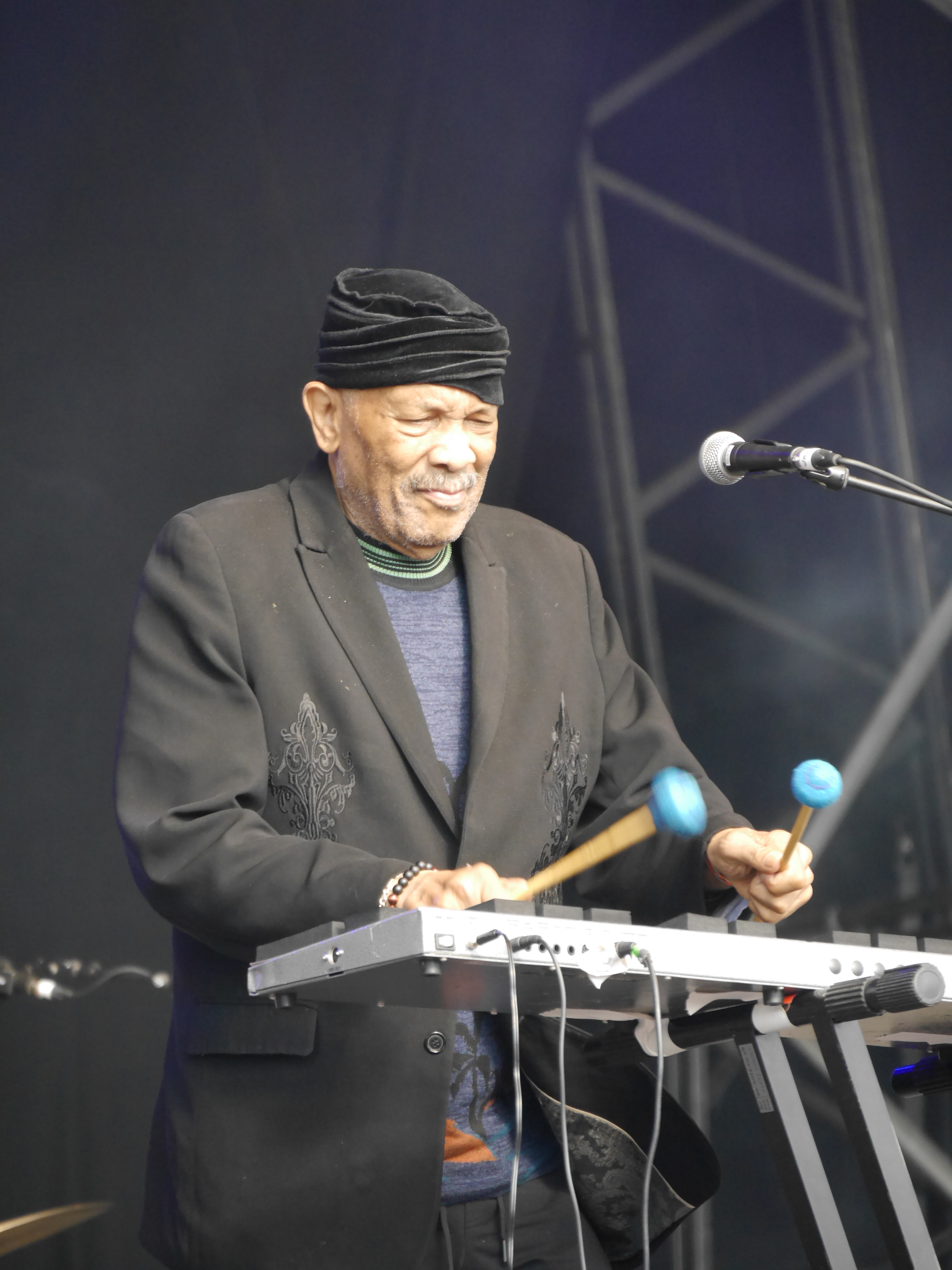
Kenny G and Roy Ayers were the two prominent guests featured on the Whitney album.

Houston began recording contents for the album in December 1986, starting with Narada Michael Walden at Walden's recently purchased Tarpan Studios in San Rafael, California. Walden had purchased the studio in 1985, shortly after the release of Houston's debut. One of the first songs recorded for the album was her rendition of The Isley Brothers' "For the Love of You". Walden stated that Houston looked tired and "weary" from continuous work following the end of her world tour and personally asked her what she wanted to record first, to which Houston brought up the Isley Brothers hit, originally released in 1975. Walden would later tell Entertainment Weekly in 2017, "she got to the studio and took one day to rest; once she got that, she was ready." The song was the first time that Houston multi-tracked her own vocals in harmony parts as well as additional ad-libs, which increased Houston's confidence. Said Walden, "Whitney was the kind of person who loved the sound of her voice — she'd get turned on by herself!"

Not too long after recording that song, Walden presented her a dance song that had been submitted to Arista months earlier, written by the writers of Houston's previous hit, "How Will I Know", titled "I Wanna Dance with Somebody (Who Loves Me)". Walden himself initially wasn't sure how to transform a song that, to him, sounded like a "country and western rodeo song" that Olivia Newton-John could've recorded, and turn it into a funkier sounding song for Houston. According to Walden, Houston got excited over recording the song that she added her own ad-libs and lyrics, especially on the ending vamp. During Houston's tour, the singer performed an early version of the song onstage to prepare fans for her second album.

With Walden, Houston then recorded "Just the Lonely Talking Again", a song originally recorded by the soul music group (and fellow Jersey act) The Manhattans on their album, Forever by Your Side (1983), in the same session. Later, Walden would produce "Love Is a Contact Sport", a catchy danceable pop-rock number written for Houston by frequent Walden collaborator Preston Glass influenced by the Motown sound of Martha and the Vandellas and featured a tenor saxophone solo from Premik Russell Tubbs; the Chess standard "I Know Him So Well", a duet with mother Cissy Houston; the dance-rock tune "So Emotional", written by the hit team of Billy Steinberg and Tom Kelly and the pop-soul love ballad, "Where Do Broken Hearts Go". Houston initially didn't wanna record "Where Do Broken Hearts Go", thinking the song "had no depth" but Davis convinced her to record it, telling her, "this is your number one song". Frank Wildhorn later claimed Houston and Davis asked for another bridge; Smokey Robinson offered to record it during this period but was rebuffed by Wildhorn. The song had been one of the first songs picked by Davis for the album. Label mate and American recording artist Kenny G, then riding high off the success of his album, Duotones (1986), was prominently featured in some of these recordings, as he provided saxophone in two of the tracks Houston worked on with Walden.

In between the Walden recordings, Houston recorded two ballads under the production of Michael Masser — the sentimental "Didn't We Almost Have It All", co-written by Masser and award-winning songwriter Will Jennings, who had recently won a Grammy Award for co-writing Steve Winwood's number one 1986 hit, "Higher Love" (a song Houston herself would record three years later), and "You're Still My Man", which ended up replacing another Walden production, a soft rock number called "Moment of Truth", which would end up as the b-side to "I Wanna Dance with Somebody" and later became the official title of Houston's second world tour. Like "I Wanna Dance with Somebody", Houston would perform "Didn't We Almost Have It All" throughout the tour. Kashif originally wanted to have Houston record a duet remake of Mother's Finest's 1978 hit "Love Changes" but Davis turned that song down, feeling it "wasn't good enough" for the album. The artist later recruited Meli'sa Morgan to record the duet. Instead, Kashif produced a solo ballad for Houston, co-written by LeMel Humes, one of R&B artist Miki Howard's frequent collaborators, titled "Where You Are". With Jellybean, Houston recorded the dance song, "Love Will Save the Day", which was notable for a vibraphone solo performed by acclaimed jazz-funk musician Roy Ayers. Houston would receive credit for vocal arrangement with all songs on the album.

== Critical reception ==
Professional ratings
Review scores
Source	Rating
AllMusic	4/5 stars
Robert Christgau	C+
Q	4/5 stars
The San Diego Union-Tribune	(favorable)

Upon the album's debut, the critical reception of Whitney was mixed. Most critics admitted the commercial value of the album, but were critical because its standard pattern followed the predecessor's winning formula and the materials failed to reveal Houston's individuality.

Jon Pareles of The New York Times criticized something as formulaic on the album, stating that: "Whitney plays everything safe. It uses three of the debut album's producers. [...] There are bouncy, tinkly songs aimed at teen-agers, [...] and slow tunes aimed at sentimental adults, as before. Even the album title fits in with an Arista Records custom of separating female singers—Dionne, Aretha, Carly—from their last names." He was not positive towards her vocals on it, commenting "What's more unsettling is that in the two years since Whitney Houston was released, the singer hasn't gotten much more expressive. For too many songs, she takes the patched-together style of the debut album further [...] as if she were singing in a second language." He added that "For all the passionate avowals of the lyrics, Ms. Houston and her producers keep emotion at bay."

Vince Aletti from Rolling Stone also gave an unfavorable review, stating "the formula is more rigorously locked in than before, and the range so tightly circumscribed that Houston's potential seems to have shrunk rather than expanded" and the record is "smug, repressive and ridiculously safe." Also, he made some sarcastic comments about the first single, "I Wanna Dance with Somebody (Who Loves Me)", calling it "How Will I Know II", spoken at Hollywood's blockbuster sequels.

Robert Hilburn, in his review for Los Angeles Times, regarded the album as "another commercial blockbuster", writing that the record is "a series of highly accessible selections that will work on a variety of radio formats." However, he expressed his considerable disappointment that Whitney did precious little to define the singer's vision, adding that she had a sensational voice but didn't assert much vocal character on it.

Dolores Barclay of the Associated Press complimented Houston on her vocal ability: "Whitney Houston has a fine instrument and uses it well. Her voice takes us to places we know and to places we might want to forget and to places we dream about." But she, like other critics, was critical of the song material on the record, commenting "There is no depth, and not much excitement. Nor does this talented song stylist and Grammy winner take risks and try something just a little daring."

The St. Petersburg Times showed a favorable attitude toward her new album at large, stating "[Whitney] is, first and foremost, a product. It has been carefully designed, manufactured and packaged. As such, it's easy to be cynical about. But as products go, this is a pretty good one." They also praised her vocals: "Houston's voice sounds good, real good. [...] She's firmer, more confident."

In its review, Billboard wrote that like her debut album, Houston "[hadn't] lost... all the requirements for pop superstardom: a glorious voice, a beautiful persona, and a knack for choosing hit material..." adding that "she shows no signs of the sophomore jinx."

Cashbox wrote that the album "cements the chart-topping singer's stature as one of the world's leading female vocalists" and noted of the album's "grittier dance edge" being featured, "coupled with some winsome ballads."

Time magazine journalist Richard Corliss favorably reviewed the album, describing it as being "bolder, blacker and badder" than Houston's debut.

Ron Wynn of AllMusic in his retrospective review of the album stated, "While this is a far cry from soul, it's the ultimate in polished, super-produced urban contemporary material."

== Commercial performance ==
The release of Whitney was highly anticipated. A week before its official release on June 2, Billboard reported that the album had surpassed the 1.5 million unit mark in orders. On June 27, 1987, it debuted at number one on the Billboard 200 (formerly the Top Pop Albums chart), making Houston the first female artist in chart history to do so. Houston became just the fourth recording artist to achieve that feat behind Elton John with Captain Fantastic and the Brown Dirt Cowboy and Rock of the Westies, Stevie Wonder with Songs in the Key of Life and Bruce Springsteen & the E Street Band with Live/1975–85. The album earned another chart record by maintaining the number one position for eleven consecutive weeks, the longest run among the releases that reached peak position of the year and marking the longest tenure atop the charts after its debut since Songs in the Key of Life. Houston also became the first female artist of the rock era to send her first two albums to number one on the Billboard 200 and the first recording act since The Monkees to accomplish this. It also debuted at number fourteen on the Top R&B/Hip-Hop Albums chart (formerly the "Top Black Albums" chart) and peaked at number two where it stayed for eight consecutive weeks behind rapper LL Cool J's Bigger and Deffer, staying on the chart for a total of seventy-five weeks. The album was Houston's fastest-selling album in the United States at that time, with four million copies shipped within the first three months of its release. It would spend 31 weeks in the top ten and 77 weeks in its initial chart run. The album re-entered the Billboard 200 the week of February 25, 2012, after Houston's death, at number 122. It remained in the chart for eleven more weeks bringing the cumulative total to 88 weeks on the Billboard 200 to date. The album has sold nearly 289,000 copies more since its reentry in 2012. It also sold 806,000 units at the BMG Music Club as of February 2003. In October 2020, it was certified Diamond (10× Platinum) in the US, for selling over 10 million copies in the United States by the Recording Industry Association of America, which made Houston the first black recording artist in history to produce three diamond-certified albums.

In the United Kingdom, the album debuted at number one on the UK Albums Chart on June 13, 1987, and remained there for six weeks. This made it the first number-one album by a solo Black female artist in the UK, as well as the first album to debut at number one in both the US and in the UK. It was 1987's third best-selling album in the UK, behind Michael Jackson's Bad and U2's The Joshua Tree, and was ranked number six on list of "The Best-Selling Albums of the 1980s in UK". With 1.2 million copies sold there, it would become the biggest selling album by a female artist in the UK, a record that has since been broken. With her debut also selling over a million copies, this would make Houston the first female artist to have two albums sell over a million copies in the UK. With current sales of over 2.2 million, the album was the first album by an African-American woman to sell over 2 million in the United Kingdom.

In Canada, the album topped the albums chart for eleven weeks. It remained at number one in the same weeks as it did in America. It being the third best-selling album in 1987, behind U2's The Joshua Tree and Bon Jovi's Slippery When Wet. In addition, it peaked at number one in Germany for eleven weeks, Italy for five weeks, Norway for eleven weeks, Netherlands for six weeks, Switzerland for eleven weeks, Austria for two weeks, Sweden for four weeks, Australia for three weeks, New Zealand for two weeks, Spain, Finland, Taiwan, and so on. As a result of massive popularity across Europe, the album topped the European Hot 100 Albums chart for eight weeks in 1987. In Japan, with sales of 384,000 copies combined of LP, CD and Compact Cassette, the album became the third best-selling international album of 1987, behind Top Gun Soundtrack Album and Michael Jackson's Bad. In 1988, Whitney was certified 6× Platinum by the British Phonographic Industry (BPI) and 7× Platinum for shipments of 700,000 copies of the album by the Canadian Recording Industry Association (CRIA), respectively. It was also certified Platinum in Germany, Netherlands and Finland, respectively, 2× Platinum in Switzerland, Austria and Sweden, respectively. In November 2006, Whitney was ranked number forty-seven for sales of 2.2 million, making it her biggest-selling album in the UK, on list of "100 Best Selling Albums of All Time in the UK" announced by The Official UK Charts Company. The album has sold over 20 million copies worldwide.

== Singles ==
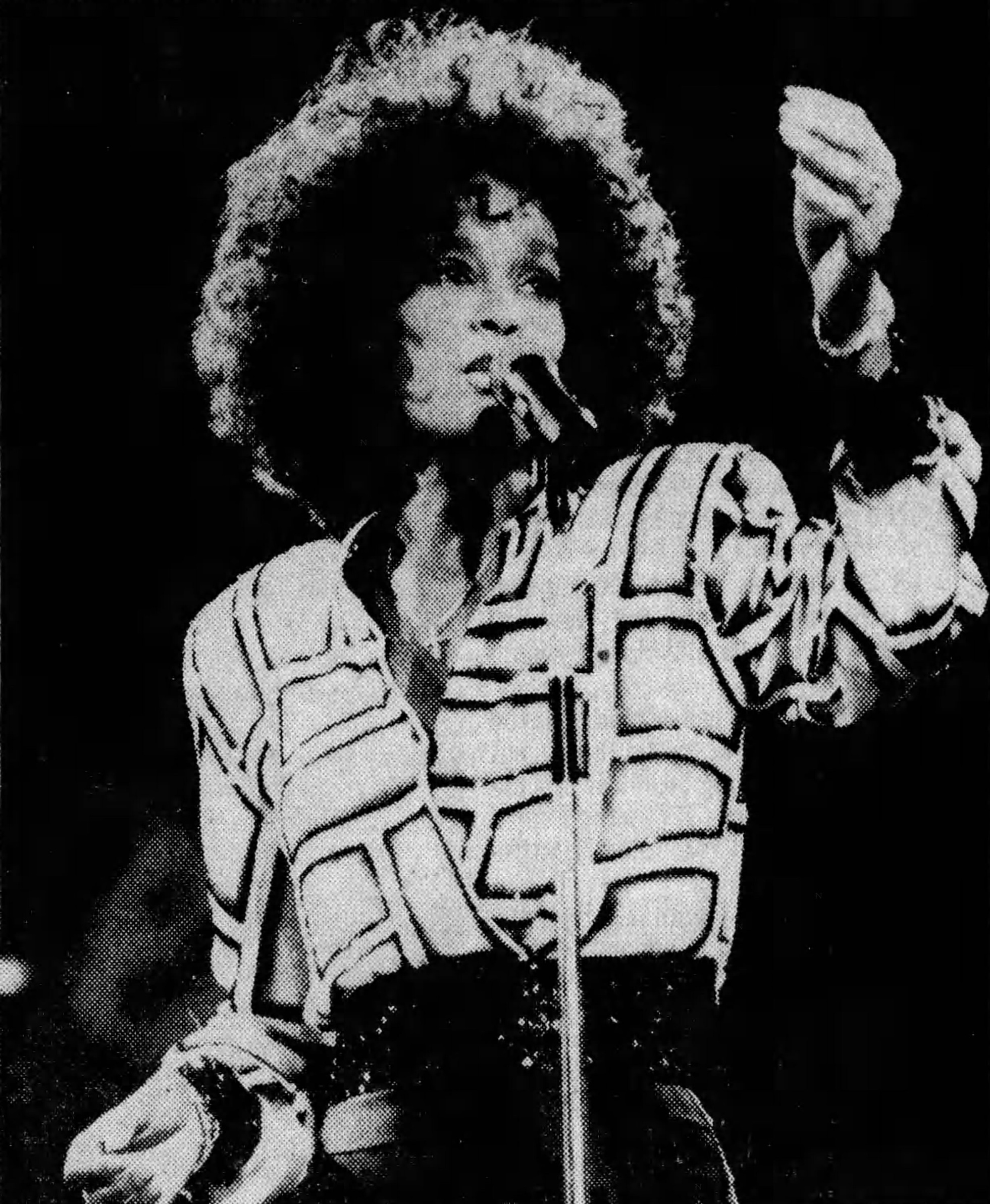
Houston performing during the 1987 leg of her Moment of Truth World Tour.

Whitney produced a record-setting five top ten singles on the Billboard Hot 100, which made Houston just the third female artist to accomplish five top ten singles off a single album, joining Janet Jackson's and Madonna's respective 1986 albums, Control and True Blue. It was also just the sixth album to produce five or more top ten singles. All of the singles reached the top ten of the Hot Black Singles and Hot Adult Contemporary Singles charts while three of the singles topped the Hot Dance Club Play chart.

With "I Wanna Dance with Somebody (Who Loves Me)", "Didn't We Almost Have It All", "So Emotional" and "Where Do Broken Hearts Go", it also yielded four number one hits, breaking her own previous record of three from her debut and setting a chart record for women, only matched by three other female artists — Paula Abdul's Forever Your Girl, Janet Jackson's Rhythm Nation 1814 and Mariah Carey's 1990 self-titled debut album, and later joined by Katy Perry's Teenage Dream, which set a new record with five. To this day, those five albums are the only ones by female artists to achieve four or more number ones on the Billboard Hot 100.

The leading single, "I Wanna Dance with Somebody (Who Loves Me)", was released to radio in April 1987, followed by a commercial single release a week later. As a result, the anticipated single landed at number 38 on the Billboard Hot 100 on May 16 and reached number one just six weeks later on June 27, becoming Houston's fourth consecutive number one hit, staying for two weeks. The song became a multi-format hit, reaching number one on both the Hot Adult Contemporary and Hot Dance/Disco Club Play charts for three and two weeks respectively, and number two on the Hot Black Singles chart. The song also became a global hit. It entered the UK Singles Chart at number 10 on May 23, 1987, and reached the number one spot on June 6, staying there for two weeks. It was Houston's first single to sell half a million copies in the UK, according to the Official Charts Company, and was her best-selling single in the country up to that point. It also peaked at number one of the singles charts in Australia for five weeks, Belgium for three weeks, Canada for a week, Germany for five weeks, Italy for one week, the Netherlands for four weeks, New Zealand for four weeks, Norway for seven weeks, Sweden for six weeks, and Switzerland for six weeks. Thanks to its strong sales and airplay across Europe, it went to the top position of the European Hot 100 Singles chart and remained at the summit for eight weeks. The single was certified Gold by the RIAA on July 28, 1987, for sales of one million more in the United States―the requirement for a Gold single prior to 1989, and re-certified Platinum for the same sales on February 13, 1989. (Note: "I Wanna Dance with Somebody (Who Loves Me)" was certified Gold according to old criteria. In 1989, the sales thresholds for singles were reduced to 500,000 for Gold and 1,000,000 for Platinum, reflecting a decrease in sales of singles.) It would eventually be certified 9× platinum by the RIAA in August 2026. In addition, it was certified Gold in the UK, Canada, and Sweden. The single sold 4.2 million copies worldwide. According to Radio & Records, it was the number one single of the year. On the Billboard Year-End, it was ranked the fourth biggest pop single of the year. Cash Box ranked it number two. In Europe, it was the second biggest-selling hit of that year and the single of the year on the pan-European music magazine, Music & Media.

The second single, the power ballad, "Didn't We Almost Have It All", followed "I Wanna Dance with Somebody" to number one on the Billboard Hot 100, replacing Michael Jackson's "I Just Can't Stop Loving You" on September 26, staying there for two weeks. It would also top the Hot Adult Contemporary Chart, where it would stay for three weeks. It reached number two on the Hot Black Singles chart and reached the same position in Canada. The single would be a certified hit in both the US and UK. In 2020, the song achieved a RIAA gold certification in the United States for sales of half a million copies. Not too long afterwards, the song would be certified silver in the UK by the BPI, where the song had reached number 14 in its initial run. The third single, "So Emotional", became the first new number one Hot 100 single for 1988, reaching the top spot on January 9, while also reaching number one on the Hot Dance Club Play chart, her second consecutive chart-topper on that chart, and reached numbers five and eight on the Hot Black Singles and Hot Adult Contemporary chart, being certified gold by the RIAA in 1995 and platinum in 2023. It also peaked at number five in the UK. The fourth single, "Where Do Broken Hearts Go", reached number one on the Billboard Hot 100 on April 23. The single helped Houston to set the all-time chart record for most consecutive number one singles on the Billboard Hot 100 by a single musical act with seven, breaking the record set by The Beatles and shared a decade later with the Bee Gees. The song reached number one on the Hot Adult Contemporary chart for three weeks and, like most of the singles on the Whitney album, peaked at number two on the Hot Black Singles chart. It has since been certified gold in the US and silver in the UK. The fifth single, "Love Will Save the Day", peaked at number 9 on the Hot 100 on August 27, 1988, also reaching number one on the Hot Dance Club Play chart, and numbers ten and five on the Hot Adult Contemporary and Hot Black Singles chart, as well as number ten in the UK. The last single, "I Know Him So Well", was only a European market release, reaching the charts in Germany, Belgium and the Netherlands, reaching the top 20 in the latter two countries.

== Promotion and appearances ==
Unlike her debut album, in which Houston appeared on late-night talk shows and other programs, most of Houston's appearances to promote the album were relegated to music shows and appearances at sporting events and award shows.

On May 15, 1987, less than a month before the album's release, Houston participated in the Montreux Golden Rose Rock Festival at the Casino de Montreux in Montreux, Switzerland where along with her previous hit, "How Will I Know", she performed "Where Do Broken Hearts Go" and "I Wanna Dance with Somebody (Who Loves Me)". Six days later, on May 21, Houston made her first appearance on the British music show, Top of the Pops, performing "I Wanna Dance with Somebody (Who Loves Me)" live.

Two months later, on August 2, Houston appeared at the Special Olympics Summer Games Opening Ceremonies, held at the University of Notre Dame in Notre Dame, Indiana, performing "Love Will Save the Day" and "Didn't We Almost Have It All". Houston then appeared live via satellite from a performance at the Saratoga Springs Performing Arts Center in Saratoga Springs, New York for the 1987 MTV Video Music Awards on September 11, marking her second performance on the program, performing "Didn't We Almost Have It All" and "I Wanna Dance with Somebody". The performance of the former was so well received that it became the "official" music video for the song and aired on all three major music video networks MTV, BET and VH1.

On January 25, 1988, Houston co-hosted the 1988 American Music Awards and performed "Where Do Broken Hearts Go", though the ballad wouldn't come out as a single until the following month, on February 15. Then, on March 2, Houston opened the 30th Annual Grammy Awards with "I Wanna Dance with Somebody (Who Loves Me)".

== Moment of Truth World Tour ==
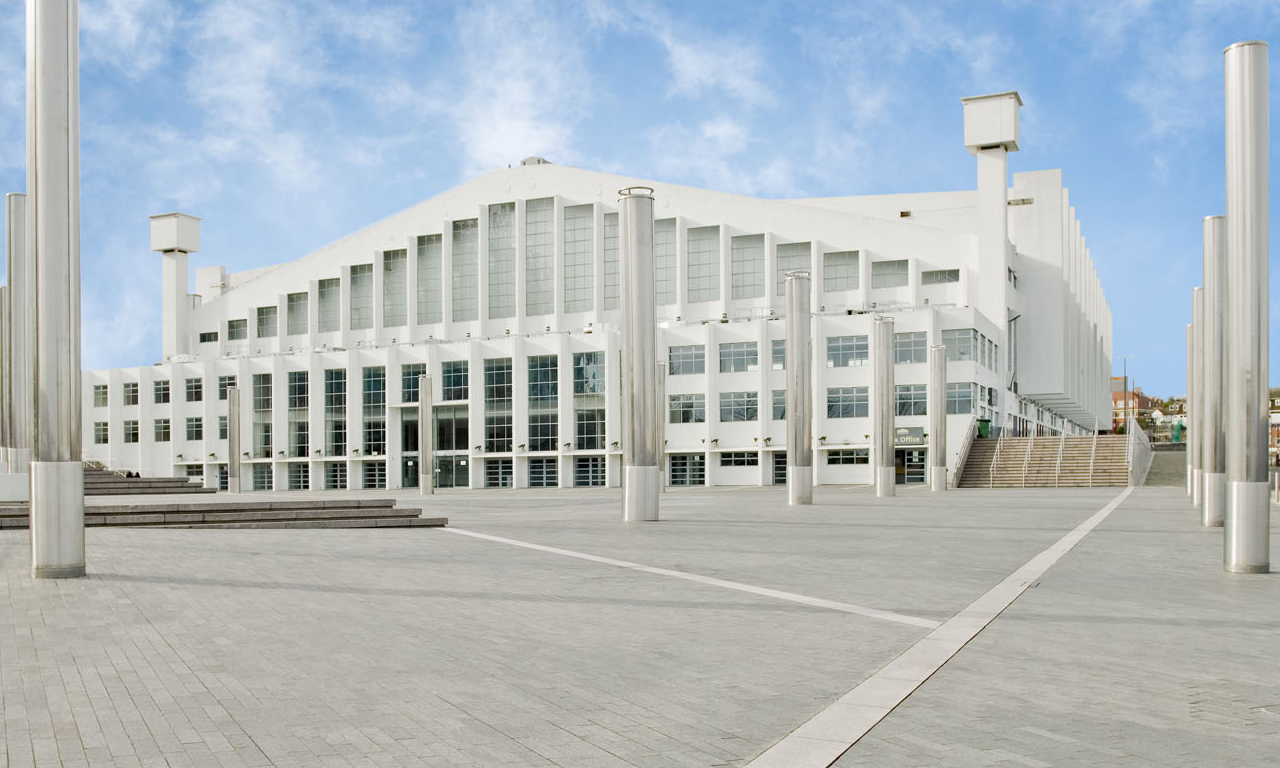
Houston's Moment of Truth World Tour set a record for the most shows performed in a single year by a female artist with nine at London's Wembley Arena.

Almost immediately after the release of the album, Houston embarked on her second world tour to promote the album, titled the Moment of Truth World Tour, named after a leftover song from the album's sessions and a b-side for "I Wanna Dance with Somebody". The expansive tour would take Houston to four continents — North America, Europe, Oceania and Asia — the same four where she had toured for her previous album, but unlike the last tour, Houston performed more shows and at bigger stages, performing 160 shows. The tour started at Tampa Stadium in Tampa on July 4, 1987, where Houston performed in front of 70,000 fans. The North American leg of the tour ran for 89 dates, which included stops at the Louisiana Superdome and The Summit, and ended at the Orange County Civic Center in Orlando on December 8. During the North American leg, Houston dedicated a medley of then-current R&B songs by artists such as Janet Jackson, Anita Baker and Luther Vandross. Jazz arrangements were apparent in performances for songs such as "Saving All My Love for You" and "Just the Lonely Talking Again", both of whom had Houston duetting with the saxophonist with jazz scatting. The highlights during the tour were for the gospel ballad "He/I Believe" and "Greatest Love of All".

After a co-headlining gig with Frank Sinatra at Village Theatre Sanctuary Cove in Gold Coast, Queensland on January 7, 1988, Houston launched the European leg of the tour on April 17, at Forest National in Brussels, Belgium, followed by a sold-out four night residence at the Rotterdam Ahoy in Rotterdam, Netherlands between April 19–24. After five successful nights at the NEC Arena in Birmingham, England from April 27 through May 2, she then embarked on a historic nine-date run at London's Wembley Arena, surpassing the female record of seven dates, set by Tina Turner, who set the record on her Break Every Rule World Tour a year earlier. One of the Wembley shows was later recorded and taped for an Italian television special about Houston. During that historic residency, Houston was offered the song, "One Moment in Time", for the 1988 Summer Olympics in Seoul; the song was later released and became another worldwide hit for Houston. Unlike the North American leg, which had followed similar patterns to the previous tour, with Houston performing solely with her band, the rest of the tour had Houston being backed up by dancers, with their dance routines being choreographed by Damita Jo Freeman and Khandi Alexander. Houston had previewed the new set while performing at the Grammy Awards earlier in March. Her European tour was viewed by half a million fans, in which she visited 12 countries, as opposed to just three on the previous tour.

On June 11, Houston took part in the Nelson Mandela 70th Birthday Tribute concert at London's Wembley Stadium, performing a total of eight songs. Houston, an early supporter of Nelson Mandela and the anti-apartheid movement, had been approached to participate in the event, to which Houston agreed to skip a scheduled concert in Rome for the occasion. On August 24, Houston returned to the United States to give a benefit concert at New York's Madison Square Garden, to support the United Negro College Fund's mission to fund historically black colleges and universities, eventually raising $300,000 for the event. Houston was later awarded the Frederick D. Patterson Award by the UNCF in March 1990, less than two years after the concert. It was Houston's only North American show for the 1988 leg of the tour. After stops in Australia and Japan, Houston ended the tour with a sold-out three date residency at the Hong Kong Coliseum in Kowloon on November 20.

Houston received mostly positive reviews on the tour. The Montreal Gazette wrote in their review of a Houston concert in Montreal, "whatever faults the 24-year-old singer has, she is first and foremost a creative musician." Jon Pareles of The New York Times wrote in his review that "Houston may be a new kind of pop singer for the video era: an encyclopedic, restless virtuoso. She has absorbed the soul and pop styles of everyone from Aretha Franklin to Barbra Streisand to Diana Ross to Al Green; she can deliver a gospel rasp, a velvety coo, a floating soprano and a cheerleader's whoop." The tour became a financial success. For the North America leg, Houston grossed $24.1 million, a record for a female North American concert tour of the 1980s; Pollstar ranked the tour one of the top ten highest-grossing tours of 1987, towering over Turner's Break Every Rule World Tour and Madonna's Who's That Girl World Tour and the only female tour listed in the top ten. The tour's success landed Houston on Forbes, where she earned a total of $43 million alone that year, $19 million of those coming from album sales. Every date on the European leg of the tour was sold out as well.

== Legacy ==
=== Impact ===
The album's success was unprecedented for a female artist at the time of its release. It was the first album by a woman to debut at number one on the Billboard 200 at a time when number one debuts weren't commonplace.

Houston also preceded other female artists in achieving the most number one pop singles off an album at a time, a record she held for 24 years. It was also the first album by a black female soloist to top the charts in several countries including the UK and Japan.

In an article on PMA Magazine, it stated that the Whitney album was a "seismic event in pop music history". It was credited as a "groundbreaking achievement that redefined the possibilities for female artists."

Pop Rescue called the album a "classic 80s album, and one that rightfully gave Whitney the huge international stardom and exposure that she deserved."

NJ.com labeled the recording "N.J.'s greatest pop album" in its 30th anniversary article on the album, crediting it for "[changing] New Jersey music and global pop history forever".

In that same article, Trevor Anderson stated of Houston breaking the mold for black female artists to break into pop comparing her to Diana Ross' acclaim in the 1970s and her R&B counterparts, "When you look at the way music had cast black women in particular before 1987, Diana Ross was the sole exception of someone who was poppy. But when you look at the '70s in particular, and you look at the Gladys's and the Aretha's and the Natalie's and people of that era, they were all relegated to this R&B-first act. And then Whitney comes along, and she has this dynamic where she's appealing to a pop audience -- she's young, she's very beautiful but she can sing as well as any of the greats, if not better", explaining that with this album, Houston had "opened up the playbook to Mariah Carey ... and then down the line, Beyoncé is sort of the heir".

In 2017, Entertainment Weekly credited the album for cementing Houston as "the Voice of her generation".

In 2024, Goldmine magazine compared the success of the album to Michael Jackson's Thriller with the publication calling it the "female equivalent" of that album.

=== Accolades ===
Much like her last album, Houston received numerous awards for her work on the album. At the 30th Annual Grammy Awards, the album received four Grammy nominations, including Album of the Year and Best Female R&B Vocal Performance for her rendition of "For the Love of You". Houston won her second Grammy when "I Wanna Dance with Somebody (Who Loves Me)" received the award for Best Female Pop Vocal Performance, her second consecutive win in the category. Michael Masser and Will Jennings received the Grammy nomination for Song of the Year for "Didn't We Almost Have It All", while Narada Michael Walden received the Grammy for Producer of the Year, Non-Classical, prominently for his work on the album. At the 1988 and 1989 American Music Awards, Houston won four awards out of five nominations, winning two in the former ceremony for Favorite Pop/Rock Female Artist and Favorite Pop/Rock Song for "I Wanna Dance with Somebody (Who Loves Me)" and another two in 1989, one for Favorite Pop/Rock Female Artist and the other for Favorite Soul/R&B Female Artist.

At the 1988 and 1989 American Black Achievement Awards, Houston won the Music Award for two consecutive years, sharing the former award with fellow artist and longtime friend Luther Vandross. For the Billboard Number One Awards, Houston was ranked the top selling female albums artist of 1987. In 1988, she was ranked the top selling female singles artist of that year. At the first annual Garden State Music Awards in the singer's home state, Houston won seven awards, including Best Album in both the rock and R&B categories for Whitney. Houston was nominated the NAACP Image Award for Outstanding Female Artist in 1987. At the People's Choice Awards, Houston was named Favorite Female Performer twice in 1988 and 1989. At the 3rd Annual Soul Train Music Awards, Houston received two nominations and won one for Best Female R&B/Soul Album for Whitney. At the end of 1988, the album won two awards at the NARM Awards for best-selling album by a female recording artist and best-selling album by a black female recording artist.

The German teen magazine, Bravo awarded Houston the Silver Otto Award for Female Singer of 1988. Houston received two Brit Award nominations for best international solo artist of 1988 and best international female artist of 1989.

== Track listing ==
No.	Title	Writer(s)	Length
1.	"I Wanna Dance with Somebody (Who Loves Me)"	George Merrill; Shannon Rubicam	4:51
2.	"Just the Lonely Talking Again"	Sam Dees	5:32
3.	"Love Will Save the Day"	Toni C.	5:21
4.	"Didn't We Almost Have It All"	Michael Masser; Will Jennings	5:05
5.	"So Emotional"	Billy Steinberg; Tom Kelly	4:36
6.	"Where You Are"	LeMel Humes; James Calabrese; Dyan Humes	4:10
7.	"Love Is a Contact Sport"	Preston Glass	4:19
8.	"You're Still My Man"	Masser; Gerry Goffin	4:16
9.	"For the Love of You"	O'Kelly Isley; Rudolph Isley; Ronald Isley; Marvin Isley; Chris Jasper	5:31
10.	"Where Do Broken Hearts Go"	Frank Wildhorn; Chuck Jackson	4:37
11.	"I Know Him So Well" (duet with Cissy Houston)	Tim Rice; Benny Andersson; Björn Ulvaeus	4:30

== Personnel ==
Credits from Richard Buskin.

Musicians

- Whitney Houston – lead vocals, background vocals (1, 3, 5, 6, 9), vocal arrangements
- Linden Aaron – Simmons toms (3)
- Walter Afanasieff – synthesizers (1), keyboards and synth bass (5), DX7 (7, 11), Prophet 2002 and Oberheim Matrix-12 (7), Kurzweil K250 and Roland MKS-80 Super Jupiter (11)
- Roy Ayers – vibes (3)
- Kitty Beethoven – background vocals (1, 2, 7, 10)
- Bongo Bob – percussion programming (5, 7), drum sampling (5)
- Michael Boddicker – synths (8)
- Robbie Buchanan – Rhodes (4, 8), acoustic piano and string arrangement (4)
- Toni C. – arranging (3)
- Paulinho da Costa – percussion (3)
- Kevin Dorsey – background vocals (1)
- Nathan East – bass (4, 8)
- Sammy Figueroa – percussion (3)
- Kenny G – tenor saxophone (2, 7), alto saxophone and lyricon (9)
- Michael Gibbs – string arrangements and conducting (2, 10, 11)
- Jim Gilstrap – background vocals (1, 2, 7, 10)
- Preston Glass – percussion programming (1, 7), keyboards and synth strings (7), Linn and Roland 808 (9), synth programming and bells (10), DX7 (11)
- Gigi Gonaway – Simmons (1, 7, 10), tambourine (7)
- Jennifer Hall – background vocals (1, 2, 7, 10)
- Niki Haris – background vocals (2, 7, 10)
- Vincent Henry – saxophone solo (6)
- Jerry Hey – horn arrangements and horn section (7)
- Lee Holdridge – vocal arrangements (4)
- Cissy Houston – vocals (11)
- Dann Huff – guitar (6)
- Paul Jackson, Jr. – guitar (3, 4, 8)
- Randy Jackson – bass synth (1, 10), electric bass (2, 7, 11), Moog synthesizer (9)
- Jellybean – drum programming (3)
- Bashiri Johnson – percussion (3)
- Kashif – keyboards, synths, programming, rhythm arrangement and background vocals (6)
- Randy Kerber – acoustic piano (8)
- Paul Leim – drums (6)
- Cory Lerios – Oberheim Xpander (7), synthesizer (11)
- Frank Martin – DX7 Vibes (2), synthesizers (2, 10), DX7 and Oberheim Matrix-12 (9), piano (10)
- Myrna Matthews – background vocals (1)
- Marcus Miller – bass (6)
- Gene Page – string arrangements (6, 8) horn arrangements (6), rhythm arrangements (8)
- Paul Pesco – guitar (6)
- Raul Rekow – congas (7, 9)
- Claytoven Richardson – background vocals (7)
- John Robinson – drums (4, 8)
- Marc Russo – alto saxophone (1), horn section (7)
- Corrado Rustici – guitar synth (1, 2, 5, 7, 10, 11)
- Ira Siegel – guitar (6)
- Sterling Smith – synth horns (1)
- Premik Russell Tubbs – horn section (7)
- Shambhu Neil Vineberg – acoustic guitar (7)
- Narada Michael Walden – drums (1, 5, 7), drum programming (9, 10), acoustic drums (11), "brushes on the kit of life" (2)
- Wanye Wallace – horn section (7)
- Jack Waldman – synthesizers and arranging (3)
- Fred Zarr – synthesizers (3)

Technical personnel

- Noah Baron – additional assistant engineer (1, 2, 5, 7, 9–11)
- Rob Beaton – additional assistant engineer (1, 2, 5, 7, 9–11)
- Jim Boyer – engineer (4, 8)
- Dean Burt – engineer (4, 8)
- Milton Chan – assistant engineer (6)
- Dana Jon Chappelle – assistant engineer (1, 2, 5, 7, 9–11)
- Lincoln Clapp – additional engineer (1, 2, 5, 7, 9–11)
- Clive Davis – executive producer
- Nick Delre – assistant engineer (3)
- Michael DeLugg – engineer (4, 8)
- Mike Dotson – assistant engineer (6)
- Doc Dougherty – engineer (3)
- John Drankchak – assistant engineer (6)
- Maureen Droney – additional engineer (1, 2, 5, 7, 9–11)
- David Frazer – engineer and mixing (1, 2, 5, 7, 9–11)
- Toni Greene – assistant engineer (3)
- Darroll Gustamachio – engineer and mixing (6)
- Calvin Harris – additional engineer (6)
- Jay Healy – assistant engineer (3)
- Stuart Hirotsu – additional assistant engineer (1, 2, 5, 7, 9–11)
- Paul "Goatee" Hamingson – additional assistant engineer (1, 2, 5, 7, 9–11)
- Michael Hutchinson – engineer and mixing (3)
- Jellybean – producer (3)
- Kashif – producer (6)
- Ken Kessie – additional engineer (1, 2, 5, 7, 9–11)
- Fernando Kral – assistant engineer (3, 4, 8)
- Fred Law – engineer (4, 8)
- Bob Loftus – assistant engineer (6)
- Gordon Lyon – additional engineer and additional assistant engineer (1, 2, 5, 7, 9–11)
- Steve MacMillan – assistant engineer (6)
- Mike Mancini – engineer (4, 8)
- George Marino – mastering
- Tony Maserati – assistant engineer (3, 4, 8)
- Michael Masser – producer (4, 8)
- Dennis McKay – additional engineer (3)
- Bill "Sweet William" Miranda – additional assistant engineer (1, 2, 5, 7, 9–11)
- Dennis Mitchell – assistant engineer (6)
- Paul Pesce – assistant engineer (3)
- Don Peterkofsky – assistant engineer (3)
- Tim Reppert – assistant engineer (3)
- Jay Rifkin – additional engineer (1, 2, 5, 7, 9–11)
- Mike Ross – assistant engineer (6)
- Mark Roule – assistant engineer (3)
- Russell Sidelsky – production coordinator (6)
- Larry Smith – assistant engineer (6)
- Russ Terrana – engineer and mixing (4, 8), additional engineer (6)
- Craig Vogel – assistant engineer (3)
- Narada Michael Walden – producer and arranging (1, 2, 5, 7, 9–11)
- Ross Williams – additional assistant engineer (1, 2, 5, 7, 9–11)
- Alicia Winfield – production coordinator (4, 8)
- Amy Ziffer – assistant engineer (6)

Artistic personnel

- Richard Avedon – front cover and inner sleeve photography
- Mark Larson – design
- Bernard Maisner – hand lettering
- Milton Sincoff – art production

== Charts ==
=== Weekly charts ===
1987 weekly chart performance
Chart (1987)	Peak position
Australian Albums (Kent Music Report)	1
Austrian Albums (Ö3 Austria)	1
Canada Top Albums/CDs (RPM)	1
Dutch Albums (Album Top 100)	1
European Top 100 Albums (Music & Media)	1
French Albums (SNEP)	6
German Albums (Offizielle Top 100)	1
Icelandic Albums (IFPI)	1
Italian Albums (Musica e dischi)	1
Japanese Albums (Music Labo)	1
New Zealand Albums (RMNZ)	1
Norwegian Albums (VG-lista)	1
Swedish Albums (Sverigetopplistan)	1
Swiss Albums (Schweizer Hitparade)	1
UK Albums (Official Charts)	1
US Billboard 200	1
US Top R&B/Hip-Hop Albums (Billboard)	2

2012 weekly chart performance
Chart (2012)	Peak position
South Korean International Albums (Circle)	31
UK Album Downloads (Official Charts)	81
UK R&B Albums (Official Charts)	14
US Billboard 200	87

2023 weekly chart performance
Chart (2023)	Peak position
Belgian Albums (Ultratop Wallonia)	126
Danish Vinyl Albums (Hitlisten)	14
German Albums (Offizielle Top 100)	87
Scottish Albums (Official Charts)	37
Spanish Vinyl Albums (Promusicae)	11
UK R&B Albums (Official Charts)	1
US Vinyl Albums (Billboard)	25

=== Year-end charts ===
1987 year-end chart performance
Chart (1987)	Position
Australian Albums (Kent Music Report)	9
Austrian Albums (Ö3 Austria)	6
Canada Top Albums/CDs (RPM)	3
Dutch Albums (Album Top 100)	5
European Top 100 Albums (Music & Media)	5
German Albums (Offizielle Top 100)	4
New Zealand Albums (RMNZ)	9
Swiss Albums (Schweizer Hitparade)	5
UK Albums (Music Week)	3
UK Dance Albums (Music Week)	2
US Top Pop Albums (Billboard)	23
US Top Black Albums (Billboard)	20

1988 year-end chart performance
Chart (1988)	Position
Austrian Albums (Ö3 Austria)	26
Canada Top Albums/CDs (RPM)	76
Dutch Albums (Album Top 100)	15
European Top 100 Albums (Music & Media)	24
UK Albums (Music Week)	17
UK Dance Albums (Music Week)	7
US Top Pop Albums (Billboard)	12
US Top Black Albums (Billboard)	5

=== Decade-end charts ===
1980–1989 decade-end chart performance
Chart (1980–1989)	Position
Austrian Albums (Ö3 Austria)	22

=== All-time charts ===
All-time chart performance
Chart	Position
UK Albums (OCC) (Female)	16
US Billboard 200	159
US Billboard 200 (Women)	44

== Certifications and sales ==
Region	Certification	Certified units/sales
Australia (ARIA)	3× Platinum	210,000^{^}
Austria (IFPI Austria)	2× Platinum	100,000^{*}
Brazil	—	250,000
Canada (Music Canada)	7× Platinum	700,000^{^}
Denmark (IFPI Danmark)	Platinum	20,000^{‡}
Finland (Musiikkituottajat)	Platinum	59,053
France (SNEP)	Platinum	300,000^{*}
Germany (BVMI)	Platinum	500,000^{^}
Greece (IFPI Greece)	Gold	50,000
Hong Kong (IFPI Hong Kong)	Platinum	20,000^{*}
Italy (FIMI)	Gold	200,000
Japan	—	384,000
Malaysia	—	37,000
Netherlands (NVPI)	Platinum	100,000^{^}
New Zealand (RMNZ)	Platinum	15,000^{^}
Norway (IFPI Norway)	Platinum	100,000
Singapore	—	38,000
Spain (Promusicae)	2× Platinum	200,000^{^}
Sweden (GLF)	2× Platinum	200,000^{^}
Switzerland (IFPI Switzerland)	2× Platinum	100,000^{^}
United Kingdom (BPI)	7× Platinum	2,237,603
United States (RIAA)	Diamond	10,000,000^{^}
Summaries
Worldwide	—	20,000,000
^{*} Sales figures based on certification alone.^{^} Shipments figures based on certification alone.^{‡} Sales+streaming figures based on certification alone.

== See also ==
- List of best-selling albums
- List of best-selling albums by women
- List of Top 25 albums for 1987 in Australia
