= Forever by Your Side (song) =

Single by The Manhattans

from the album Forever by Your Side
- B-side: "Locked Up in Your Love"
- Released: September 1983
- Recorded: 1983 (at Celestial Sound Studios)
- Genre: Soul; R&B
- Length: 4:27 (Album and single)
- Label: Columbia Records
- Songwriters: Marc Blatte; Larry Gottlieb
- Producers: Marc Blatte; Larry Gottlieb

The Manhattans singles chronology
"Crazy" (1983)	"Forever by Your Side" (1983)	"You Send Me" (1985)

Music video
- "Forever By Your Side" by The Manhattans live at the Soul Train (1983) on YouTube

"Forever by Your Side" is a romantic song written and produced by the American songwriters and music producers Marc Blatte and Larry Gottlieb. The song was recorded in 1983 by popular American R&B vocal group The Manhattans and released the same year on the album Forever by Your Side. The title track "Forever by Your Side" was released as a single in September 1983, and had moderate success in the US, peaking at number 30 on the R&B chart, but did not reach any position on the Billboard Hot 100.

In contrast to the small American reception, "Forever by Your Side" was a big hit in Brazil. In 1985, the song was included on the soundtrack of a Brazilian telenovela A Gata Comeu, produced and shown on television by the broadcaster Rede Globo, the world's second largest television network, between the months of April and October 1985, two years after the song was released. "Forever by Your Side" was a huge success in Brazil, ranking first position in the country and among the most played songs in Brazil in 1985.

"Forever by Your Side" was the second and final single from Forever by Your Side, released after the success of the album hit "Crazy".

The song has a Portuguese version in Brazil, called "Pra Sempre Vou Te Amar", recorded by some Brazilian artists.

== Music video ==
"Forever by Your Side" has no video official clip, only a video with a presentation of The Manhattans in the American musical variety television program Soul Train in 1983, presented by American television show host Don Cornelius. The video can be watched on "Forever By Your Side" by The Manhattans live at the Soul Train (1983) on YouTube.

== Chart positions ==
=== Weekly charts ===
US Chart (1983)	Peak position
US Hot R&B/Hip-Hop Songs (Billboard)	30
US Top 100 Black Singles (Cash Box)	34

=== Year-end charts ===
Brazil (1985)	Position
The Most Played Songs in Brazil: 1985	54

== Track listing ==
Side	Song	Length	Interpreters	Writer/composer	Producers	Original album	Recording year
A-side	"Forever by Your Side"	4:27	The Manhattans	Marc Blatte, Larry Gottlieb	Marc Blatte, Larry Gottlieb	Forever by Your Side	1983
B-side	"Locked Up in Your Love"	4:40	The Manhattans	John V. Anderson, Steve Williams	John V. Anderson, Steve Williams	Forever by Your Side	1983

== B-side ==
The B-side of the single contains the song "Locked Up in Your Love", which was also recorded by The Manhattans in 1983 for the album Forever by Your Side. It was written and produced by the musicians John V. Anderson and Steve Williams, (the same authors as "Crazy"). It was a simple song from their album that was not released as a single.

== Personnel ==
- Lead vocal – Gerald Alston
- Backing vocals – Winfred "Blue" Lovett, Edward "Sonny" Bivins, Kenneth "Wally" Kelly
- Written by – Marc Blatte, Larry Gottlieb
- Arranged by (Rhythm & Vocals) – Marc Blatte, Larry Gottlieb, Ralph Schuckett
- Arranged by (Strings) – Ralph Schuckett
- Drum programming (Linn programming) – Ralph Schuckett
- Piano – Ralph Schuckett
- Percussion – Sue Evans
- Acoustic guitar – Ira Siegel
- Electric bass – Wayne Brathwaite
- Strings – Eugene Moye, Gerald Tarack, Guy Lumia, Jesse Levy, Max Ellen, Regis Iandiorio, Richard Henrickson, Sanford Allen

=== Credits ===
- Produced by – Marc Blatte, Larry Gottlieb
- Executive Producer – Morrie Brown
- Engineer (Celestial Sounds) – Steve Goldman
- Engineer (Additional) – Chuck Ange, Steve Addabbo
- Engineer (Assistant) – Dean Cochren, Larry DeCarmine
- Mixed by – Steve Goldman

=== Companies ===
- Recorded at – Celestial Sound Studios, New York City, NY
- Mixed at – Celestial Sound Studios, New York City, NY
- Mastered at – Frankford/Wayne Mastering Labs
- Pressed by – Columbia Records Pressing Plant, Pitman
- Published by – Blatte-Gottlieb Music, Inc.
- Produced for – Mighty M. Productions Ltd.
- Manufactured by – Columbia Records
- Manufactured by – CBS Inc.
- Phonographic Copyright ℗ – CBS Inc.
- Copyright – CBS Inc.

=== Notes ===
- ℗ 1983 CBS Inc.
- Taken from the Columbia Records LP Forever by Your Side FC 38600

== Portuguese version ==
In 1986, "Forever by Your Side" won a Portuguese version in Brazil, called "Pra Sempre Vou Te Amar". The lyrics in Portuguese were written by Brazilians Guto Angelicci and Carlinhos Kalunga, recorded by the Brazilian singer Adriana, and included in the complementary soundtrack for the Rede Globo's telenovela Mandala (As 'Preteridas' de Tony Carrado) in 1987. "Pra Sempre Vou Te Amar" was later recorded by the Brazilian sertanejo duo Wilson & Soraia in 1995, and was included in the soundtrack of the Rede Globo's telenovela Irmãos Coragem (second version) in 1995. In 2001, "Pra Sempre Vou Te Amar" was recorded again, by the Brazilian singer of Contemporary Christian music Robinson Monteiro. The credits for "Pra Sempre Vou Te Amar" ("Forever by Your Side") are Marc Blatte and Larry Gottlieb, version Guto Angelicci and Carlinhos Kalunga.
