= Black Tie (album) =

Studio album by the Manhattans
- Released: 1981
- Studio: Universal, Chicago, Illinois
- Genre: Soul, R&B
- Label: Columbia
- Producer: Leo Graham

The Manhattans chronology
After Midnight (1980)	Black Tie (1981)	Forever by Your Side (1983)

Professional ratings
Review scores
Source	Rating
AllMusic	3/5 stars

Black Tie is the twelfth studio album by American vocal group the Manhattans, released in 1981 through Columbia Records.

== Reception ==
The album peaked at No. 21 on the R&B albums chart. It also reached No. 86 on the Billboard 200. The album features the singles "Just One Moment Away", "Let Your Love Come Down", and "Honey, Honey", which peaked at No. 19, No. 77, and No. 25 on the Hot Soul Singles chart, respectively.

== Track listing ==
Side one
No.	Title	Writer(s)	Length
1.	"Just One Moment Away"	Leo Graham, Paul Richmond	4:29
2.	"You Stand Out"	Leo Graham, James Mack	4:12
3.	"Let Your Love Come Down"	Leo Graham, Paul Richmond	3:45
4.	"Honey, Honey"	Earl Kenneth King, Jr.	3:46
5.	"When You See Me Laughing"	Winfred Lovett	3:40

Side two
No.	Title	Writer(s)	Length
1.	"I Wanta Thank You"	Leo Graham, Paul Richmond, Brian Hines	3:50
2.	"Deep Water"	Jon Lind, Nan O'Byrne	3:35
3.	"Just Can't Seem to Get Next to You"	Gerald Alston, Barbara Morr	3:33
4.	"I Was Made for You"	Jerry Ragovoy, Betsy Matthes	4:11
5.	"When I Leave Tomorrow"	Gerald Alston, Barbara Morr	4:34

== Charts ==
Album

Chart (1982)	Peaks
U.S. Billboard Top LPs	86
U.S. Billboard Top Soul LPs	21

Singles

Year	Single	Peaks
Year	Single	US R&B
1981	"Just One Moment Away"	19
1981	"Let Your Love Come Down"	77
1982	"Honey, Honey"	25
