= Shining Star (The Manhattans song) =

Single by The Manhattans

from the album After Midnight
- B-side: "I'll Never Run Away From Love Again"
- Released: February 1980
- Recorded: 1980
- Studio: Universal, Chicago, Illinois
- Genre: Soul; R&B
- Length: 4:40 (Album full version); 3:45 (Single edited version)
- Label: Columbia Records
- Songwriters: Leo Graham; Paul Richmond
- Producer: Leo Graham

The Manhattans singles chronology
"The Way We Were" / "Memories" (1979)	"Shining Star" (1980)	"Girl of My Dream" (1980)

Music video
- "Shining Star" by The Manhattans (Official Music Video) on YouTube

"Shining Star" is a popular song written by the American songwriters and music producers Leo Graham and Paul Richmond. The song was recorded in 1980 by popular American R&B vocal group The Manhattans and released the same year on the album After Midnight. "Shining Star" was released as a single in 1980 and peaked at number 4 on the US Billboard R&B chart, and number 5 on the U.S. Billboard Hot 100. The song was most successful in New Zealand, where it reached position number 2; the same position that it also reached in the Black Oriented Singles of the Record World magazine in the USA. Although it did not reach the number-one on any chart, "Shining Star" was The Manhattans' highest-charting hit since the worldwide hit "Kiss and Say Goodbye" released in 1976.

== Grammy Award ==
"Shining Star" won the Grammy Award for Best R&B Performance by a Duo or Group with Vocals in 1980. It was the only Grammy Award received by The Manhattans.

== Track listing ==
Side	Song	Length	Interpreters	Writer/composer	Producers	Original album	Release year
A-side	"Shining Star"	3:45	The Manhattans	Leo Graham, Paul Richmond	Leo Graham	After Midnight	1980
B-side	"I'll Never Run Away From Love Again"	3:40	The Manhattans	Gerald Alston, Barbara Morr	Norman Harris, The Manhattans	After Midnight	1980

- The full length of "Shining Star" on the album After Midnight is 4:40. The length of 3:45 on the 7" single is an edited version of the song.

== B-side ==
The B-side of the "Shining Star"'s 7" single contains the song "I'll Never Run Away From Love Again", which was also recorded by The Manhattans in 1980 for the album After Midnight. It was written by lead vocalist Gerald Alston and Barbara Morr. The song is the last track on the album and was produced by Norman Harris and The Manhattans.

== Charts, certifications, and accolades ==
=== Weekly charts ===
Chart (1980)	Peak position
Australia (Kent Music Report)	67
Canada Adult Contemporary (RPM)	10
Canada Top Singles (RPM)	6
New Zealand (Recorded Music NZ)	2
UK Singles (Official Charts)	45
US Adult Contemporary (Billboard)	21
US Adult Contemporary (RW)	9
US Black Oriented Singles (RW)	2
US R&B Chart (Billboard)	4
US Singles (Record World)	4
US Billboard Hot 100 (Billboard)	5
US Top 100 Singles (Cash Box)	7
US Top 100 R&B (Cash Box)	4

=== Awards ===
23rd Annual Grammy Awards (1980)	Result
Best R&B Performance by a Duo or Group with Vocal	Won

=== Year-end charts ===
Chart (1980)	Position
Brazil (Top Hits)	45
Canada Top 100 Singles (RPM)	50
New Zealand (Recorded Music)	17
US Pop Singles (Billboard)	22
US Soul Singles (Billboard)	14
US Top 100 Black Singles (CB)	13
US Top 100 Singles (CB)	42
US Top A/C Record Group (RW)	17
US Top Black Single (RW)	12
US Top Black Single Group (RW)	7
US Top Record Group (RW)	10
US Top Record Overall (RW)	20

=== End-of-decade charts ===
Chart (1980–1989)	Position
Greatest Soul Songs of the 1980s	94

=== Certifications and sales ===
Country (1980–2001)	Certification	Sales
United States (RIAA)	Platinum	1,000,000

== Personnel ==
- Written by – Leo Graham and Paul Richmond
- Lead Vocal – Gerald Alston
- Backing vocals – Winfred "Blue" Lovett, Edward "Sonny" Bivins, Kenneth "Wally" Kelly
- Arranged by – James Mack

=== Credits ===
- Producer – Leo Graham
- Associate Producer – James Mack
- Executive Producer – Mickey Eichner
- Coordinator (Production) – Hermi Hanlin
- Engineer (Mastering) – Stu Romaine

=== Companies ===
- Recorded at – Universal Studios, Chicago
- Mastered at – CBS Recording Studios, New York, NY
- Manufactured By – Columbia Records
- Phonographic Copyright ℗ – CBS, Inc.
- Copyright – CBS, Inc.

=== Notes ===
- ℗ 1980 CBS, Inc.
- Taken From The Columbia Records LP After Midnight JC 36411

== In popular culture ==
"Shining Star" was performed many times by the Jerry Garcia Band during their 1991 through 1994 tours. It frequently appeared to open or near the beginning of the second set. On October 6, 1993, at The Warfield Theater, the band opened the second set with the song. The audience spontaneously began singing the chorus in unison towards the end of the song and the band quieted and riffed off the audience. This became the standard and the song was always performed with audience participation from then on, extending to a length of up to 25 minutes in some performances. The band was so amused that they opened the second set with "Shining Star" again the following night. This was not the first instance of the audience taking part. See the April 24, 1993 show, also at the Warfield. The song was used in the 1983 Derrick episode "Die kleine Ahrens" and the 2006 Cold Case episode "Baby Blues". From 1999, "Shining Star" began to be interpreted in Brazil by the Brazilian singer Maurício Manieri, in his own Portuguese version "Pensando em Você".

== Portuguese version ==
In 1998, "Shining Star" won a Portuguese version in Brazil, performed by Brazilian singer and musician Maurício Manieri. This version received the title "Pensando em Você", with lyrics in Portuguese written by Manieri himself, and was released on his album A Noite Inteira in 1998. "Pensando em Você" was released as a single in Brazil and Portugal in 1999, and became a big hit of Maurício Manieri, reaching position number 5 in the national parade of Brazil and position number 49 in Portugal (according to the discography of Manieri in Wikipedia in Portuguese). The credits for "Pensando em Você" ("Shining Star") are by Leo Graham and Paul Richmond, version Mauricio Manieri.

== See also ==
- List of Billboard Year-End Hot 100 singles of 1980
- List of 23rd Annual Grammy Awards of 1980
- List of Grammy Award for Best R&B Performance by a Duo or Group with Vocals
