= The Manhattans =

American R&B vocal group

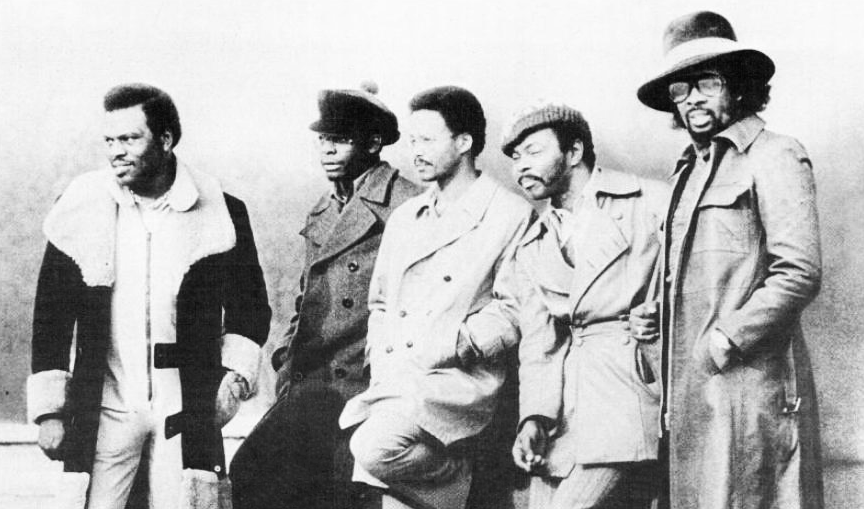
- The Manhattans in 1972 (L-to-R): Richard "Ricky" Taylor, Gerald Alston, Kenneth "Wally" Kelly, Ed "Sonny" Bivins, Winfred "Blue" Lovett

Background information
- Origin: Jersey City, New Jersey, United States
- Genres: Rhythm and blues, Philadelphia soul, soul
- Years active: 1962–present
- Labels: Carnival Records, Columbia/CBS, Sony, King Records
- Members: The Manhattans featuring Gerald Alston: Gerald Alston; Troy May; Lawrence “Weas” Newton; The Manhattans of Sonny Bivins: Charles Hardy; Harsey Hemphill; Keni Jackson; Kirk Hill Jr.
- Past members: Richard "Ricky" Taylor; George "Smitty" Smith; Kenneth "Wally" Kelly; Edward "Sonny" Bivins; Winfred "Blue" Lovett; Roger Harris; Alvin Pazant; Wade Taylor; Lee Williams; David Tyson; Dwight Fields

The Manhattans are an American R&B vocal group. Their songs "Kiss and Say Goodbye", recorded in 1976, and 1980's "Shining Star", both sold millions of copies. The Manhattans have recorded 45 hits on the Billboard R&B Chart, including twelve top-10 R&B hits in the United States, starting in 1965. Sixteen of their songs have reached the Billboard Hot 100, including two top 10s and a number-one hit with their song "Kiss and Say Goodbye". They also charted eight U.S. R&B top 20 Albums, three of which were RIAA certified gold. The Manhattans were inducted into The Atlantic City Walk of Fame in September 2024.

== Early history ==
The Manhattans, originally from Jersey City, New Jersey, formed in 1962 with members George "Smitty" Smith (December 28, 1939 – December 16, 1970), Edward "Sonny" Bivins (January 15, 1936 – December 3, 2014), Winfred "Blue" Lovett (November 16, 1936 – December 9, 2014), Kenny "Wally" Kelly (January 9, 1941 – February 17, 2015), and Richard "Ricky" Taylor (1940 – December 7, 1987). Bivins, Lovett, and Kelly graduated from Lincoln High School, while Taylor and Smith graduated from Snyder High School. All five enlisted in the armed forces and came together as a group following their discharges from their respective branches.

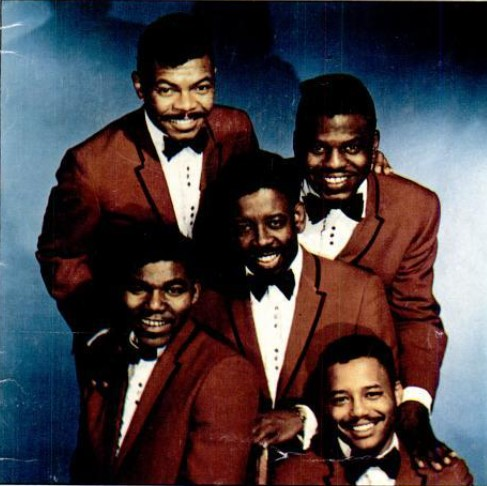
1966

The group's first single was "For the Very First Time", released in 1964 by Carnival Records. The Manhattans continued recording successfully with songs written by various members of the group. In 1968, the group received the "Most Promising Group" award by NATRA (the National Association of Television and Radio Announcers). In 1969, the group moved to the De Luxe record label, a subsidiary of King Records, and subsequently embarked on a college tour. While playing at Kittrell College in North Carolina, the group met another group, the New Imperials, featuring Gerald Alston, nephew of The Shirelles' lead singer, Shirley Alston-Reeves. They were so impressed with Alston that they asked him to join the group, but he declined.

Misfortune hit the group late in 1970 when Smith fell ill. With Smith unable to perform, the group began to search for a new lead. First they attempted to woo The Cymbals' lead, Lee Williams, but he was unwilling to leave his current group. The group then renewed their request to Gerald Alston (born November 8, 1951), who accepted and took over the lead spot. Smith died of a brain tumor on December 16, 1970, 12 days before his 31st birthday.

The Manhattans continued recording throughout the 1970s with Alston singing lead vocals. They struck chart gold in 1973 with the Bivins-written song "There's No Me Without You". Then their biggest song was their March 1976 release "Kiss and Say Goodbye", written by Blue Lovett and arranged/co-produced with the group by the Philadelphia-based record producer Bobby Martin, a former member of the MFSB band of session musicians. The song quickly became a number-1 chart-topper on both the US Billboard Pop and R&B charts. It also became the second ever single to go platinum, after the RIAA introduced that certification level in 1976. Taylor left in 1976 to concentrate on his conversion to Islam. He died in 1987 after a long illness.

The group continued as a quartet, and found further success in March 1980 with the release of "Shining Star", which reached number 5 on the Billboard Hot 100 and number 4 on the R&B Chart. Produced and co-written by the Chicago-based record producer, Leo Graham, it received a Grammy Award the following spring.

In 1983, The Manhattans released the album Forever by Your Side, by Columbia Records, which had two singles that year. The first was the song "Crazy", the great success of this album, peaked at number 4 on the R&B chart. The second single was the title track "Forever by Your Side", which had moderate success in the United States, peaked at number 30 on the R&B chart, but has become a great success and a romantic classic in Brazil two years later, when it was included as part of the soundtrack of a soap opera in the country. The success led to a Portuguese version the following year, called "Pra Sempre Vou Te Amar", which also was successful in Brazil, and has been recorded by several Brazilian artists. Another highlight of this album Forever by Your Side was the song "Just the Lonely Talking Again", written by the American singer and songwriter Sam Dees, which was originally recorded by The Manhattans for this 1983 album and was later re-recorded by Whitney Houston on her second studio album, Whitney, in 1987.

The group celebrated its 20th anniversary in 1985 with the release of Too Hot to Stop It. It included the Evans/Smith-penned "When We're Made as One", originally recorded in 1966 but covered in an a cappella, doo wop style to emphasize the group's doo wop roots. The album was also dedicated to George Smith.

The group continued until 1988. That year, Alston left to record as a solo artist, scoring with several major R&B hits in the late 1980s and early 1990s for Motown. Roger Harris was recruited as the new lead singer for the group, which moved to the new label, Valley Vue, when their Columbia recording contract expired.

== Later history ==
The group's largest shake-up was in December 1990, when Blue Lovett left the group, upon his doctor's request, for health reasons. Kenny Kelly left to return to college to pursue his PhD. Bivins continued along with lead singer Roger Harris who had replaced Gerald Alston in 1988–89 along with new members. He recruited new members Charles Hardy and Harsey Hemphill, who in October 1990 had auditioned for Bivins but didn't come aboard until after Lovett and Kelly left at the end of 1990. In early 1991 Bivins added Alvin Pazant, bringing the group back to a quintet. Harris proved to be only a short-term lead, and in April 1991 he was replaced by Wade Taylor. Taylor was replaced in July 1991 when Bivins recruited Lee Williams, the person whom they had originally wanted to replace George Smith.

In the 2000s, there were two versions of The Manhattans. One version featured original founding member Bivins, plus Hardy, Hemphill, Pazant and Williams. They released the CD Manhattans Now in 1994. In 1996, the group formed their own full-service music corporation company called Manhattan Entertainment Inc. In 2003 and 2007, they were featured artists in two theater plays, Girl He Aint Worth It and The Chicken Shack. In June 2013, the group released a single called "Just for Tonite" written by Bivins and Pazant and produced and arranged by Leroy Burgess. In 2015, Lee Williams retired and was replaced by Keni Jackson as the new lead singer. And they still continue to perform, with the same line up in 2018.

The other version of The Manhattans featured original member Blue Lovett, plus Gerald Alston, the lead singer on the group's biggest hits. Other members include Troy May and David Tyson (died 2022), brother of The Temptations' Ron Tyson. In the past, the group also featured Eban Brown, who later spent 18 years as lead vocalist for The Stylistics. This group has also released some CDs, including Even Now. This version of the group was featured in two PBS specials and performed at casinos and theaters across the United States. Alston appeared on Wu-Tang Clan's album, 8 Diagrams, on the song "Stick Me for My Riches" in 2007.

Edward "Sonny" Bivins, founding member of the Manhattans, died on December 3, 2014, at the age of 78. He sang on every Manhattans hit since the group's inception, and wrote many of their hit songs. He led the Manhattans up until his death.

Winfred "Blue" Lovett, the group's original bass singer and songwriter, died on December 9, 2014, at the age of 78. His bass voice was heard on many Manhattans hits, including the spoken word intro to "Kiss and Say Goodbye". He was replaced by Gerald Alston's cousin, Dwight Fields in The Manhattans featuring Gerald Alston till his death on August 26, 2016.

Kenneth "Wally" Kelly, the last surviving original member of the group, died on February 17, 2015, at the age of 74.

Lead singer Gerald Alston is the only member alive of the group's heyday lineup.

David Tyson, a member of The Manhattans featuring Gerald Alston died of an illness on February 17, 2022, at the age of 62.

On September 23, 2024, The National R&B Music Society inducted The Manhattans into The Atlantic City Walk of Fame. Gerald Alston, Edward "Sonny" Bivins, Winfred "Blue" Lovett, Kenneth Kelly, Richard Taylor and George Smith were the inductees. Radio personality Maurice "The Voice" Watts inducted them. Gerald Alston was in attendance to accept the honor. Blue Lovett's widow Anna, and daughter, and Sonny Bivins son Mark, and daughter Pamela were also in attendance.

== Discography ==
=== Studio albums ===
Year	Album	Peak chart positions						Certifications	Record label
Year	Album	US	US R&B	AUS	CAN	NLD	UK	Certifications	Record label
1966	Dedicated to You	—	19	—	—	—	—		Carnival
1967	For You and Yours	—	—	—	—	—	—		Carnival
1970	With These Hands	—	—	—	—	—	—		De Luxe
1972	A Million to One	—	35	—	—	—	—		De Luxe
1973	There's No Me Without You	150	19	—	—	—	—		Columbia
1974	That's How Much I Love You	160	59	—	—	—	—		Columbia
1976	The Manhattans	16	6	39	11	3	37	RIAA: Gold	Columbia
1977	It Feels So Good	68	12	—	78	—	—	RIAA: Gold	Columbia
1978	There's No Good in Goodbye	78	18	—	—	—	—		Columbia
1979	Love Talk	141	20	—	—	—	—		Columbia
1980	After Midnight	24	4	—	77	—	—	RIAA: Gold	Columbia
1981	Black Tie	86	21	—	—	—	—		Columbia
1983	Forever by Your Side	104	17	—	—	—	—		Columbia
1985	Too Hot to Stop It	171	44	—	—	—	—		Columbia
1986	Back to Basics	—	—	—	—	—	—		Columbia
1989	Sweet Talk	—	—	—	—	—	—		Valley Vue
2003	...Even Now...	—	83	—	—	—	—		Beemark
2003/2008	Men Cry Too	—	—	—	—	—	—		S.D.E.G
2021	The Legacy Continues	—	—	—	—	—	—		Love Song Touring
"—" denotes a recording that did not chart or was not released in that territory.

=== Live albums ===
- Live from South Africa (1999, Classic World)

=== Compilation albums ===
Year	Album	Peak chart positions			Record label
Year	Album	US	US R&B	NLD	Record label
1980	Greatest Hits	87	18	—	Columbia
1990	Dedicated to You: Golden Classics, Part 1	—	—	—	Collectables
1990	Sing for You & Yours: Golden Classics, Part 2	—	—	—	Collectables
1995	The Best of the Manhattans: Kiss and Say Goodbye	—	—	—	Columbia/Legacy
2000	Love Songs	—	—	72	Columbia/Legacy
2002	Super Hits	—	—	—	Columbia/Legacy
2002	I'm the One That Love Forgot	—	—	—	Collectables
2008	Sweet Talking Soul 1965–1990	—	—	—	Shout! Factory
"—" denotes a recording that did not chart or was not released in that territory.

=== Singles ===
Year	Single	Peak chart Positions								Certifications	Album
Year	Single	US	US R&B	US A/C	AUS	CAN	NLD	NZ	UK	Certifications	Album
1964	"For the Very First Time"	—	—	—	—	—	—	—	—		Sing for You and Yours
1964	"There Goes a Fool"	—	—	—	—	—	—	—	—		Sing for You and Yours
1965	"I Wanna Be (Your Everything)"	68	12	—	—	42	—	—	—		Sing for You and Yours
1965	"Searchin' for My Baby" (A-side)	135	20	—	—	—	—	—	—		Dedicated to You
1965	"I'm the One That Love Forgot" (B-side)	135	—	—	—	—	—	—	—		Dedicated to You
1965	"Follow Your Heart"	92	20	—	—	—	—	—	—		Dedicated to You
1966	"Baby I Need You"	96	22	—	—	—	—	—	—		Dedicated to You
1966	"Can I"	—	23	—	—	—	—	—	—		Dedicated to You
1966	"I Bet'cha (Couldn't Love Me)"	128	23	—	—	—	—	—	—		Sing for You and Yours
1966	"It's That Time of the Year"	—	—	—	—	—	—	—	—		Sing for You and Yours
1967	"All I Need Is Your Love"	—	—	—	—	—	—	—	—		Sing for You and Yours
1967	"When We're Made as One"	—	31	—	—	—	—	—	—		Sing for You and Yours
1967	"I Call It Love"	96	24	—	—	—	—	—	—		Sing for You and Yours
1968	"I Don't Wanna Go"	—	—	—	—	—	—	—	—		—N/a
1968	"'Til You Come Back to Me"	—	—	—	—	—	—	—	—		—N/a
1969	"The Picture Became Quite Clear"	—	—	—	—	—	—	—	—		—N/a
1970	"It's Gonna Take a Lot to Bring Me Back"	—	36	—	—	—	—	—	—		With These Hands
1970	"If My Heart Could Speak"	98	30	—	—	—	—	—	—		With These Hands
1970	"From Atlanta to Goodbye"	113	48	—	—	—	—	—	—		—N/a
1971	"Let Them Talk"	—	—	—	—	—	—	—	—		—N/a
1971	"I Can't Stand for You to Leave Me"	—	—	—	—	—	—	—	—		A Million to One
1972	"A Million to One" (A-side)	114	47	—	—	—	—	—	—		A Million to One
1972	"Cry If You Wanna Cry" (B-side)	—	48	—	—	—	—	—	—		A Million to One
1972	"One Life to Live"	102	3	—	—	—	—	—	—		A Million to One
1973	"Back Up"	107	19	—	—	—	—	—	—		A Million to One
1973	"Rainbow Week"	—	—	—	—	—	—	—	—		—N/a
1973	"There's No Me Without You"	43	3	—	—	—	—	—	—		There's No Me Without You
1973	"Do You Ever"	—	40	—	—	—	—	—	—		A Million to One
1973	"You'd Better Believe It"	77	18	—	—	—	—	—	—		There's No Me Without You
1973	"Wish That You Were Mine"	—	19	—	—	—	—	—	—		There's No Me Without You
1974	"Summertime in the City"	—	45	—	—	—	—	—	—		That's How Much I Love You
1974	"Don't Take Your Love"	37	7	—	—	65	—	—	—		That's How Much I Love You
1975	"Hurt"	97	10	—	—	90	12	22	4	BPI: Silver	The Manhattans
1976	"Kiss and Say Goodbye"	1	1	12	4	7	1	1	4	RIAA: Platinum; BPI: Silver; MC: Gold	The Manhattans
1976	"I Kinda Miss You"	46	7	—	—	45	—	—	59 (Note: Chart position is from the official UK "Breakers List".)		It Feels So Good
1977	"It Feels So Good to be Loved So Bad"	66	6	—	—	78	—	—	—		It Feels So Good
1977	"It's You"	—	—	—	—	—	—	—	43		It Feels So Good
1977	"We Never Danced to a Love Song"	93	10	—	—	83	—	—	—		It Feels So Good
1978	"Am I Losing You"	101	6	—	—	96	—	—	—		There's No Good in Goodbye
1978	"Everybody Has a Dream"	—	65	—	—	—	—	—	—		There's No Good in Goodbye
1979	"Here Comes the Hurt Again"	—	29	—	—	—	—	—	—		Love Talk
1979	"The Way We Were" / "Memories" (medley)	—	33	—	—	—	—	—	—		Love Talk
1980	"Shining Star"	5	4	21	67	6	—	2	45	RIAA: Platinum	After Midnight
1980	"Girl of My Dream"	—	30	—	—	—	—	—	—		After Midnight
1980	"I'll Never Find Another (Find Another Like You)"	109	12	—	—	—	—	—	—		Greatest Hits
1981	"Do You Really Mean Goodbye?"	—	—	—	—	—	—	—	—		Greatest Hits
1981	"Just One Moment Away"	—	19	—	—	—	—	—	—		Black Tie
1981	"Let Your Love Come Down"	—	77	—	—	—	—	—	—		Black Tie
1982	"Honey, Honey"	—	25	—	—	—	—	—	—		Black Tie
1983	"Crazy"	72	4	—	—	—	—	—	63		Forever by Your Side
1983	"Forever by Your Side"	—	30	—	—	—	—	—	—		Forever by Your Side
1985	"You Send Me"	81	20	8	—	—	—	48	—		Too Hot to Stop It
1985	"Don't Say No"	—	60	—	—	—	—	—	—		Too Hot to Stop It
1986	"Where Did We Go Wrong?" (with Regina Belle)	—	42	—	—	—	—	—	—		Back to Basics
1987	"All I Need"	—	41	—	—	—	—	—	—		Back to Basics
1989	"Sweet Talk"	—	67	—	—	—	—	—	—		Sweet Talk
1989	"Why You Wanna Love Me Like That"	—	62	—	—	—	—	—	—		Sweet Talk
1990	"I Won't Stop"	—	79	—	—	—	—	—	—		Sweet Talk
2001	"Nites Like This"	—	—	—	—	—	—	—	—		...Even Now...
2013	"Just for Tonite"	—	—	—	—	—	—	—	—		—N/a
"—" denotes a recording that did not chart or was not released in that territory.
