= Forever by Your Side (album) =

Studio album by the Manhattans
- Released: August 23,1983 (Original Vinyl LP); Remastered on CD in 2014
- Recorded: 1982
- Studio: Celestial Sound Studios, Universal Recording Studios, Studio Sound Recorders
- Genre: Soul; R&B
- Length: 36:37 (Original release)
- Label: Columbia
- Producer: George Tobin Productions Inc, Leo Graham Enterprises, Mighty M. Productions Ltd.

The Manhattans chronology
| Black Tie (1981) | Forever by Your Side (1983) | Too Hot to Stop It (1985) |

Singles from Forever by Your Side
- 1. "Crazy" Released: June 1983; 2. "Forever by Your Side" Released: September 1983

Professional ratings
Review scores
| Source | Rating |
|---|---|
| AllMusic | 2/5 stars |

Forever by Your Side is the 13th studio album of American popular R&B vocal group the Manhattans, released in 1983 by Columbia Records. The album was recorded at Celestial Sound Studios (New York, NY), Studio Sound Recorders (North Hollywood), Universal Recording Studio (Chicago, III) and produced by George Tobin Productions Inc, Leo Graham Enterprises, Mighty M. Productions Ltd. This album brought the two singles by The Manhattans of 1983: the song "Crazy" and the title track "Forever by Your Side". The ballad "Crazy" was the big hit of this album, peaked at #4 on the R&B chart. The love song "Forever by Your Side" had moderate success in the United States, peaked at #30 on the R&B chart, but has become a great success and a romantic classic in Brazil two years later, when she was part of the soundtrack of a soap opera in the country in 1985. Another highlight of this album was the song "Just The Lonely Talking Again", which was later re-recorded by Whitney Houston in 1987, on her second studio album Whitney. The original release of "Forever by Your Side" from 1983 in Vinyl LP has only eight tracks. In 2014, the album was remastered on CD with the caption "Expanded Edition" and brought five bonus tracks, totaling 13 tracks. These bonus tracks include the single version of "Crazy", "Just The Lonely Talking Again" and "Love Is Gonna Find You", with shorter durations than the original songs on the album. There is also the instrumental version of great success "Crazy", without the voices of The Manhattans. The final track number 13, "Lovin' You Did not Come Easy", was also recorded by The Manhattans, but, was never released in any album of the group. The song was released in 2014 remastered as a previously unreleased song, over thirty years after it was recorded.

== Track listing ==
| No. | Title | Writer(s) | Producer(s) | Length |
|---|---|---|---|---|
| 1. | "Crazy" | John V. Anderson; Steve Williams; Steve Horton | Anderson; Williams | 4:52 |
| 2. | "Start All Over Again" | Lotti Golden; Richard Scher | Morrie Brown | 4:35 |
| 3. | "Forever by Your Side" | Marc Blatte; Larry Gottlieb | Blatte; Gottlieb | 4:27 |
| 4. | "Just The Lonely Talking Again" | Sam Dees | Joe McEwon; Leo Graham; Morrie Brown | 4:52 |
| 5. | "Locked Up in Your Love" | Anderson; Williams | Anderson; Williams | 4:40 |
| 6. | "Lover's Paradise" | Gary Goetzman; Mike Piccirillo | George Tobin; Piccirillo | 3:50 |
| 7. | "Love Is Gonna Find You" | Graham; Paul Richmond | Leo Graham | 5:05 |
| 8. | "I'm Ready To Love You Again" | Gloria Sklerov; Mark Holden; Peter Hamilton | Graham | 4:16 |
| Total length: | | | | 36:37 |

"Expanded Edition", Remastered in 2014 (CD Bonus tracks)
| No. | Title | Writer(s) | Length |
|---|---|---|---|
| 9. | "Crazy" (Single version) | Anderson; Williams; Steve Horton | 4:00 |
| 10. | "Crazy" (Instrumental) | Anderson; Williams; Horton | 5:00 |
| 11. | "Love Is Gonna Find You" (Single version) | Graham; Richmond | 4:55 |
| 12. | "Just The Lonely Talking Again" (Single version) | Sam Dees | 4:09 |
| 13. | "Lovin' You Didn't Come Easy" (Previously unreleased) | Ronald Holden; Gloria Sklerov; William Threlfall | 4:40 |

== Charts ==
=== Album ===
| Chart (1983) | Peak position |
|---|---|
| US Top 75 Black Albums (Cashbox) | 12 |
| US R&B/Hip-Hop Albums (Billboard) | 17 |
| US Top 100 Albums (Cashbox) | 79 |
| US Billboard 200 (Billboard) | 104 |

=== Singles ===
| Year | Single | Chart Peak Position | | | | |
| Year | Single | US | US R&B | CB | CB R&B | UK |
|---|---|---|---|---|---|---|
| 1983 | "Crazy" | 72 | 4 | 76 | 3 | 63 |
| 1983 | "Forever by Your Side" | — | 30 | — | 34 | — |
"—" denotes a recording that did not chart or was not released in that territory.

== Personnel ==
01. "Crazy" (4:52)

- Writers: John V. Anderson, Steve Williams, Steve Horton
- Producers: John V. Anderson, Steve Williams
- Executive Producers: Morrie Brown
- Drum Programming (Linn): John V. Anderson, Steve Williams
- Drums: Leslie Ming
- Electric Bass: Wayne Brathwaite
- Electric Piano (Rhodes): John V. Anderson
- Guitar: Steve Williams
- Keyboards: John V. Anderson
- Piano: John V. Anderson
- Synthesizer (Moog): John V. Anderson

02. "Start All Over Again" (4:35)

- Writers: Lotti Golden, Richard Scher
- Producer: Morrie Brown
- Arrangers: Morrie Brown, Ralph Schuckett
- Arranger (Strings): Ralph Schuckett
- Backing Vocals: Ike Floyd, Janet Wright, Krystal Davis
- Co-producer (Associate): Richard Scher
- Drum Programming (Linn): Morrie Brown, Richard Scher
- Drums (Additional): Leslie Ming
- Electric Bass (Fender): Neil Jason
- Piano: Richard Scher
- Guitar: Ira Siegel
- Percussion: Richard Scher, Steve Goldman
- Synthesizer (Memory Moog): Richard Scher
- Electric Piano (Fender Rhodes): Richard Scher
- Strings: Diana Halprin, Eugene J. Moye Jr., Guy Lumia, Harry Cykman, Jesse Levy, Max Ellen, Regis Iandorio, Sanford Allen

03. "Forever by Your Side" (4:27)

- Writers: Marc Blatte, Larry Gottlieb
- Producers: Marc Blatte, Larry Gottlieb
- Arrangers: (Rhythm & Vocals): Marc Blatte, Larry Gottlieb, Ralph Schuckett
- Arranger: (Strings): Ralph Schuckett
- Drum Programming (Linn Programming): Ralph Schuckett
- Acoustic Guitar: Ira Siegel
- Electric Bass: Wayne Brathwaite
- Percussion: Sue Evans
- Piano: Ralph Schuckett
- Strings: Eugene Moye, Gerald Tarack, Guy Lumia, Jesse Levy, Max Ellen, Regis Landiorio, Richard Henrickson, Sanford Allen

04. "Just The Lonely Talking Again" (4:52)

- Writer: Sam Dees
- Producers: Joe McEwon, Leo Graham, Morrie Brown
- Arranger: James Mack
- Bass: Paul Richmond, Russell Keating
- Conductor: James Mack
- Drums: Morris Jennings
- Electric Piano (Fender Rhodes): James Mack
- Guitar: Byron Gregory, Ira Siegel
- Percussion: Steve Goldman
- Piano: Theodis Rodgers
- Synthesizer: Ed Tossing, Steve Goldman

05. "Locked Up In Your Love" (4:40)

- Writers: John V. Anderson, Steve Williams
- Producers: John V. Anderson, Steve Williams
- Arrangers (Vocals & Rhythm): John V. Anderson, Steve Williams
- Arranger (Strings & Reed): John V. Anderson
- Drum Programming (Linn): John V. Anderson, Steve Williams
- Backing Vocals: Ike Floyd, Krystal Davis, Phillip Ballou
- Synthesizer (Bass): John V. Anderson
- Flute: Louis Cortelezzi
- Guitar: Steve Williams
- Keyboards: John V. Anderson
- Percussion: Steve Croon
- Piano: John V. Anderson
- Saxophone: Louis Cortelezzi
- Strings: Eugene Moye, Gerald Tarack, Guy Lumia, Jesse Levy, Max Ellen, Regis Landiorio, Richard Henrickson, Sanford Allen

06. "Lover's Paradise" (4:27)

- Writers: Gary Goetzman, Mike Piccirillo
- Producer: George Tobin
- Producer (Associate): Mike Piccirillo
- Bass: Scott Edwards
- Drums: Ed Greene
- Guitar: Mike Piccirillo
- Keyboards: Bill Cuomo
- Saxophone: Joel Peskin
- Synthesizer: Mike Piccirillo

07. "Love Is Gonna Find You" (5:05)

- Writers: Leo Graham, Paul Richmond
- Producer: Leo Graham
- Arranger: James Mack
- Bass: Paul Richmond, Russell Keating
- Conductor: James Mack
- Drums: Morris Jennings
- Electric Bass (Fender): James Mack
- Guitar: Byron Gregory
- Piano: Theodis Rodgers
- Synthesizer: Ed Tossing

08. "I'm Ready To Love You Again" (4:16)

- Writers: Gloria Sklerov, Mark Holden, Peter Hamilton
- Producer: Leo Graham
- Arranger: James Mack
- Bass: Paul Richmond, Russell Keating
- Conductor: James Mack
- Drums: Morris Jennings
- Electric Bass (Fender): James Mack
- Piano: Theodis Rodgers
- Synthesizer: Ed Tossing

Credits

- Co-producer (Production Assistance): Brenda Ferrell (track 6)
- Coordinator (Artist / Musician Interviews): Randy Mahon
- Coordinator (Production): Brad Schmidt (track 6)
- Coordinator (Reissue): Jeff James, Leo Sacks
- Coordinator (Release): Craig Turnbull
- Design: Audrey Satterwhite, John Berg
- Design (Reissue Package): Wallace Create
- Design, Typography (Hand Lettering): John Pistilli
- Engineer (Celestial Sounds; Additional): Chuck Ange (tracks: 1 to 3, 5, 9, 10), Steve Addabbo (tracks: 1 to 5, 9, 10, 12)
- Engineer (Celestial Sounds; Assistant): Dean Cochren (tracks: 1 to 3, 5, 9, 10), Larry DeCarmine (tracks: 1 to 3, 5, 9, 10)
- Engineer (Celestial Sounds): Steve Goldman (tracks: 1 to 5, 9, 10, 12)
- Engineer (Universal Recording Studios): Mike Ferraro (tracks: 4, 7, 8, 11, 12), Stu Walder (tracks: 4, 7, 8, 11, 12)
- Liner Notes, Research: Matt Bauer
- Mastered by: Herb Powers
- Mixed by: Michael Hutchinson (tracks: 4, 12), Steve Goldman (tracks: 1 to 3, 5, 9, 10)
- Photography by: David Kennedy
- Production Manager [Reissue]: Matt Murphy
- Recorded by: Hal Helleman (track 6)
- Recorded by (Additional, Assistant): Alan Hirshberg (track 6)
- Recorded by (Additional): Les Brockman (track 6)
- Reissue Producer: Tony Calvert
- Remastered by: Sean Brennan
- Supervised by (Direction): Gary Goetzman (track 6)

Companies

- Phonographic Copyright: Columbia Records
- Copyright: Funkytowngrooves USA
- Manufactured by: Sony Music Entertainment
- Marketed by: Funkytowngrooves Ltd
- Distributed by: Funkytowngrooves Ltd
- Produced for: George Tobin Productions Inc.
- Produced for: Leo Graham Enterprises
- Produced for: Mighty M. Productions Ltd.
- Recorded at: Celestial Sound Studios, New York, NY
- Recorded at: Studio Sound Recorders
- Recorded at: Universal Recording Studio
- Mixed at: Celestial Sound Studios, New York, NY
- Mixed at: Sigma Sound Studios, New York
- Mastered at: Frankford/Wayne Mastering Labs
- Remastered at: Battery Studios, New York

Notes

- Originally released on Columbia Records, 1983.
- Recorded at Celestial Sound Studios (New York, NY), Studio Sound Recorders (North Hollywood), Universal Recording Studio (Chicago, III), 1983.
- Mixed at Celestial Sound Studios (New York, NY), 1983.
- The bonus track number 13 "Lovin' You Didn't Come Easy" was never released. It was only launched in 2014 as previously unreleased track.
- 2014 Funkytowngrooves USA, this compilation 2014 Columbia Records, a division of Sony Music Entertainment.
