= Gerald Alston =

American singer

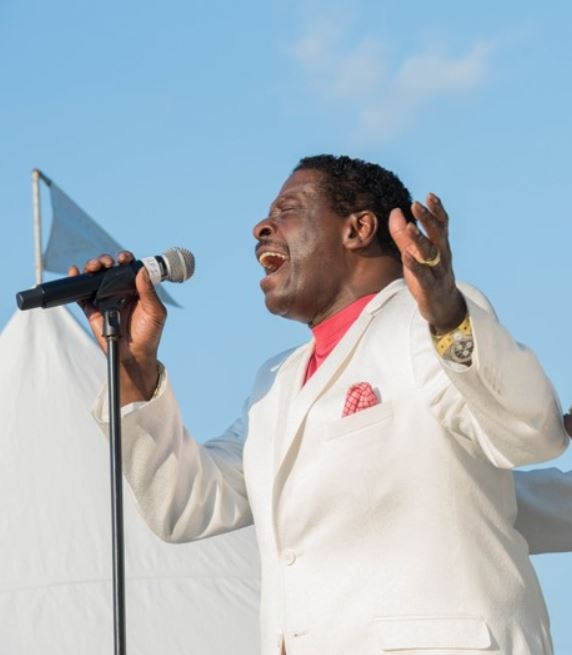
- Gerald Alston in Atlantic City June 22, 2019 Photo by Julius "Juice" Freeman

Background information
- Born: November 8, 1951 (age 75)
- Origin: Henderson, North Carolina, U.S.
- Genres: R&B; soul
- Instrument: Vocals
- Years active: 1970–present
- Labels: Motown Records, RCA
- Member of: The Manhattans
- Website: www.geraldalstonmusic.com

"Activated" (1989)
Sample of the hit single

Gerald Alston (born November 8, 1951) is an American soul/R&B singer, and the lead singer of the Manhattans. Between late 1970 and 1988, the group had 25 top 40 R&B and 12 Hot 100 hit singles. Alston was lead singer on their most successful 1976 platinum song "Kiss and Say Goodbye", which topped the U.S. Pop and R&B charts and was number one in four countries. Alston left the group in 1988 to pursue a solo career and recorded five albums and ten singles, including the hit singles "Take Me Where You Want To", "Slow Motion" and "Getting Back into Love". He also recorded a remake of Atlantic Starr's "Send for Me", most of which was for Motown Records.

== Career ==
=== Early life ===
Alston was born on November 8, 1951, in Henderson, North Carolina to the Rev. J.B. Alston and Geraldine Harrelson. Alston is the nephew of Gospel singer Johnny Fields of The Blind Boys of Alabama. He grew up in the church where he learned his craft. Alston was just a teenager he formed a group called, the New Imperials who sang both secular and Gospel music. When the group would perform in churches they would change their name to the Gospel Jubilee.

=== The Manhattans ===
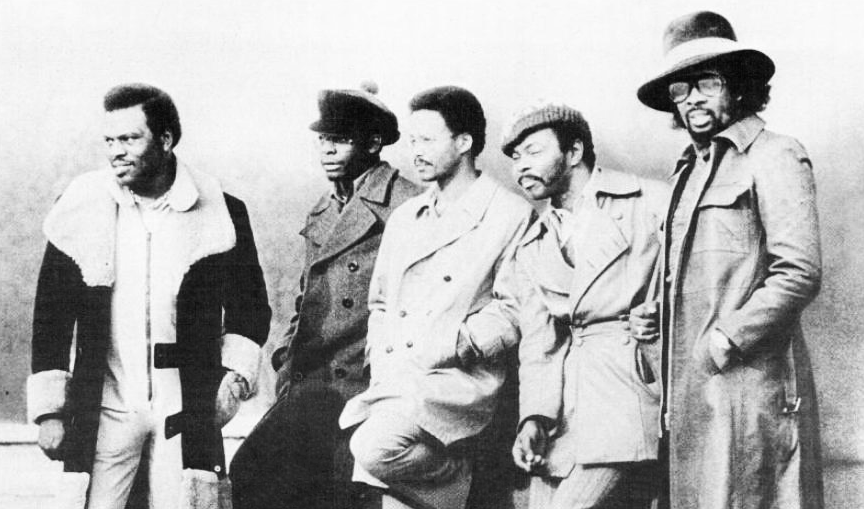
Gerald Alston (second from left) as part of The Manhattans in 1972.

In 1970, The Manhattans members were, George "Smitty" Smith, Edward "Sonny" Bivins Jr., Winfred "Blue" Lovett, Kenny "Wally" Kelly, and Richard "Ricky" Taylor.

Alston joined the Manhattans in 1970, shortly after the death of their former lead singer George Smith. As lead singer, Alston helped the group achieve their first Pop and R&B top ten singles that reached Gold and Platinum status for songs like "Kiss and Say Goodbye", "There's No Me Without You" and their Grammy Winning song, "Shining Star".

Alston with The Manhattans continued on through the 80's scoring a few more top 40 R&B hits, "Girl of My Dream" No. 30, "I'll Never Find Another (Find Another Like You)" No. 12, "Just One Moment Away" No. 19, "Honey, Honey" No. 25, "Crazy" No. 4, "You Send Me" No. 20 and some others.

In 1986, R&B singer Regina Belle recorded a duet with Alston, entitled "Where Did We Go Wrong?", on The Manhattans album "Back to Basics". The single peaked at No. 46 on the R&B chart.

Alston left the Manhattans in 1988 to pursue a solo career.

=== Solo career ===
After leaving the Manhattans, Alston released his debut solo album entitled, "Gerald Alston" in 1988 which spent 33 weeks on the Soul/R&B Billboard albums chart and peaking at No. 18 on March 4, 1989. The first single, "Take Me Where You Want To" became a top 10 R&B hit spending 18 weeks on the chart and peaking at No. 6. It was also the 94th best-performing single of 1988 on the Tokio Hot 100. Two more singles were released from that album, "I Can't Tell You Why" No. 52 and "You Laid Your Love on Me" No. 41.

On March 18, 1989, Alston appeared on season 18 episode 18 of the television series, Soul Train performing his hit single "Take Me Where You Want To" and "You Laid Your Love On Me. He also performed on March 9, 1991 season 20 episode 21.

In 1990, Alston released his most successful solo album entitled, "Open Invitation" peaking at No. 14 on the Soul/R&B Billboard Album Chart after spending 33 weeks on the chart. The album produced his highest charting solo single, "Slow Motion" a top 10 Soul/R&B hit, that spent 21 weeks on the chart peaking at No. 3. Another top 10 single, "Getting Back into Love" peaked at No. 6 after spending 15 weeks on the chart.

Between 1992 and 1995, Alston released 3 more albums and 5 more singles, with two peaking at No. 40 on the R&B chart.

=== The Manhattans featuring Gerald Alston and Blue Lovett ===
In December 1990, Blue Lovett left The Manhattans due to health issues, followed by Kenny Kelly who left and returned to college to pursue his PhD. Bivins replaced the members and continued performing with his unit until he became ill in 2013. Bivins died on December 3, 2014, at age 78.

By 1995, as Alston's solo career was winding down, he and original member Blue Lovett teamed up to form, The Manhattans Featuring Gerald Alston and Blue Lovett. New members David Tyson, the brother of Ron Tyson of The Temptations and Troy Mays were added to this unit.

=== Recent years ===
On February 5, 2014, Alston and Lovett were featured artists on the television series, Unsung the story of The Manhattans on TV One.

Alston continued to perform with his unit, The Manhattans Featuring Gerald Alston and Blue Lovett until Lovett's death on December 9, 2014 at age 78. Alston's cousin Dwight Fields replaced Lovett in the line-up until his death on August 26, 2016.

By 2015, Alston was the only surviving member of The Manhattans heyday lineup and tours under the name The Manhattans featuring Gerald Alston.

Alston along with Tyson and Mays performed on the Soul Train Cruises in 2013, 2018 and 2020.

As of 2020, Alston continues to tour the states and overseas as a solo artist and as The Manhattans Featuring Gerald Alston with Tyson and Mays.

== Personal life ==
Alston resides in New Jersey with his wife Edna and son.

Alston is the nephew of Shirley Alston Reeves, former lead singer of the Shirelles.

== Discography ==
=== Albums ===
Solo albums

Year	Album	Peaks
Year	Album	US R&B
1988	Gerald Alston	18
1990	Open Invitation	14
1992	Always in the Mood	62
1994	First Class Only	93
2021	The Legacy Continues Featuring Manhattans	—
"—" denotes the album failed to chart

=== Singles ===
Year	Song title	Peaks		
Year	Song title	US R&B	NLD	UK
1988	"Take Me Where You Want To"	6	–	–
1989	"I Can't Tell You Why"	52	83	–
1989	"Activated"	–	–	73
1989	"You Laid Your Love on Me"	41	–	–
1990	"Slow Motion"	3	–	–
1991	"Getting Back into Love"	6	–	–
1991	"Tell Me This Night Won't End"	69	–	–
1992	"Hell of a Situation (Backroom Conversation)"	40	–	–
1993	"Send for Me"	40	–	–
1994	"Stay the Night"	69	–	–
1995	"Devote All the Time"	81	–	–
