= New Zealand top 50 singles of 1976 =

This is a list of the top 50 singles of 1976 in New Zealand.

== Chart ==
Key
‡ – Single of New Zealand origin

Number	Artist	Single
1	ABBA	"Fernando"
2	Elton John & Kiki Dee	"Don't Go Breaking My Heart"
3	Pussycat	"Mississippi"
4	ABBA	"Dancing Queen"
5	Henry Gross	"Shannon"
6	Queen	"Bohemian Rhapsody"
7	The Manhattans	"Kiss And Say Goodbye"
8	The Four Seasons	"December, 1963 (Oh What A Night)"
9	The Bellamy Brothers	"Let Your Love Flow"
10	The Sylvers	"Boogie Fever"
11	Dorothy Moore	"Misty Blue"
12	Sherbet	"Howzat"
13	Elvin Bishop	"Fooled Around And Fall In Love"
14	Hot Chocolate	"You Sexy Thing"
15	Wild Cherry	"Play That Funky Music"
16	ABBA	"Mamma Mia"
17	Cliff Richard	"Devil Woman"
18	C. W. McCall	"Convoy"
19	Rod Stewart	"Tonight's The Night (Gonna Be Alright)"
20	Olivia Newton-John	"Come On Over"
21	Johnnie Taylor	"Disco Lady"
22	Tina Charles	"I Love To Love (But My Baby Loves To Dance)"
23	Nazareth	"Love Hurts"
24	Chicago	"If You Leave Me Now"
25	Walter Murphy	"A Fifth Of Beethoven"
26	Max Merritt & The Meteors	"Slipping Away"
27	Rick Dees & His Cast of Idiots	"Disco Duck"
28	Starland Vocal Band	"Afternoon Delight"
29	Pussycat	"Smile"
30	KC and the Sunshine Band	"(Shake, Shake, Shake) Shake Your Booty"
31	Natalie Cole	"Sophisticated Lady (She's a Different Lady)"
32	Dr. Hook	"Only Sixteen"
33	Bill and Boyd	"Put Another Log On The Fire"
34	10cc	"Art For Art's Sake"
35	Wings	"Silly Love Songs"
36	Fred Dagg	"Gumboots"
37	ABBA	"SOS"
38	Bay City Rollers	"I Only Wanna Be With You"
39	Harpo	"Moviestar"
40	Bee Gees	"You Should Be Dancing"
41	Jigsaw	"Sky High"
42	The Wombles	"The Wombling Song"
43	Dr. Hook	"A Little Bit More"
44	The Real Thing	"You To Me Are Everything"
45	Larry Santos	"We Can't Hide It Anymore"
46	The Carpenters	"There's A Kind Of Hush"
47	Bay City Rollers	"Saturday Night"
48	Freddy Fender	"Wasted Days And Wasted Nights"
49	Pussycat	"Georgie"
50	Johnny Nash	"Tears On My Pillow"

== Chart by numbers ==
=== Origin ===
==== By artist ====
The following shows the country of origin from where the artist (including any featured artist where applicable) originate from. Artists who appear more than once have only been tallied once.

Country	Total
United States	21
England	13
Scotland	2
Sweden	2
New Zealand	3
Australia	3
Netherlands	1

Notes
- Olivia Newton-John is British-Australian and has been tallied in both England and Australia.
- Bee Gees are British-Australian and have been tallied in both England and Australia.

==== By single ====
The following shows the country of origin from which the singles originate regardless of who the artist is.

Country	Total
United States	22
England	17
Sweden	5
New Zealand	3
Australia	3
Netherlands	3
Scotland	3

Notes
- Olivia Newton-John and Bee Gees have been included in both England and Australia tallies.

=== Most singles ===
Shows the artists with the most singles to appear in this chart. Includes where they appear as a featured artist.

Artist	Total
ABBA	4
Pussycat	3
Bay City Rollers	2
Dr. Hook	2

=== Format ===
The following shows where each single appears on, whether it was the artists album, a non-album single, an extended play or as part of a soundtrack.

Format	Total
Albums	46
non-album singles	4

Notes
- The song "Don't Go Breaking My Heart" by Elton John & Kiki Dee was a non-album single at the time, recorded during the Blue Moves sessions.
- The song "Fernando" by ABBA was initially a non-album single before being included on re-issues of Greatest Hits and Arrival.
- The song "Devil Woman" appears on the album I'm Nearly Famous by Cliff Richard in the UK but was a non-album single in some territories.

=== Multiple releases ===
The following shows singles that had multiple releases from the same album.

Title	Total	Singles
Arrival (ABBA)	2	Fernando; Dancing Queen
ABBA (ABBA)	2	Mamma Mia; SOS
First of All (Pussycat)	3	Mississippi; Smile; Georgie
Dedication / Rock n' Roll Love Letter (Bay City Rollers)	2	I Only Want to Be with You; Saturday Night

=== Type ===
The following shows the denomination that each single was released as, whether as a solo artist or as part of a group, band or duo.

Type	Total
Solo artists	21
Groups	22
Duos	4
Collaborations	1
Featured Artists	1

Notes
- Elton John & Kiki Dee have been regarded as a collaboration.

=== Top Genre ===
The following shows the most common genres the Top 50 singles are regarded as (as per their genre descriptions in the singles entries. Where a genre was not noted, the genre of the album/artist was used instead. Subgenres have been split as their own entry.

Genre	Total	Singles
Disco	13	December, 1963 (Oh What a Night) (The Four Seasons); Boogie Fever (The Sylvers); You Sexy Thing (Hot Chocolate); Disco Lady (Johnnie Taylor); I Love to Love (But My Baby Loves to Dance) (Tina Charles); A Fifth of Beethoven (Walter Murphy); Disco Duck (Rick Dees & His Cast of Idiots) (Shake, Shake, Shake) Shake Your Booty (KC and the Sunshine Band); You Should Be Dancing (Bee Gees); You to Me Are Everything (The Real Thing); Kiss and Say Goodbye (The Manhattans); I Love To Love (But My Baby Loves To Dance) already counted Sophisticated Lady (She's a Different Lady) (Natalie Cole) – listed as disco/soul
Pop	12	Fernando (ABBA); Don't Go Breaking My Heart (Elton John & Kiki Dee); Mississippi (Pussycat); Tonight's the Night (Gonna Be Alright) (Rod Stewart); Slipping Away (Max Merritt & The Meteors)‡ Afternoon Delight (Starland Vocal Band); Smile (Pussycat); There's a Kind of Hush (Carpenters); Georgie (Pussycat); Sky High (Jigsaw); The Wombling Song (The Wombles); Gumboots (Fred Dagg)‡
Soft rock	9	Don't Go Breaking My Heart (Elton John & Kiki Dee); Shannon (Henry Gross); December, 1963 (Oh What a Night) (The Four Seasons); Let Your Love Flow (The Bellamy Brothers); Fooled Around and Fell in Love (Elvin Bishop); Tonight's the Night (Gonna Be Alright) (Rod Stewart); If You Leave Me Now (Chicago); Slipping Away (Max Merritt & The Meteors); Afternoon Delight (Starland Vocal Band)
Country	5	Mississippi (Pussycat); Let Your Love Flow (The Bellamy Brothers); Convoy (C. W. McCall); Misty Blue (Dorothy Moore); Put Another Log on the Fire (Bill and Boyd)‡
Funk	5	Play That Funky Music (Wild Cherry); You Sexy Thing (Hot Chocolate); Disco Lady (Johnnie Taylor); A Fifth of Beethoven (Walter Murphy); Boogie Fever (The Sylvers)
R&B	4	Kiss and Say Goodbye (The Manhattans); Disco Lady (Johnnie Taylor); You Sexy Thing (Hot Chocolate); Play That Funky Music (Wild Cherry)
Pop rock	4	Howzat (Sherbet); Mamma Mia (ABBA); Devil Woman (Cliff Richard); Let Your Love Flow (The Bellamy Brothers)
Soul	4	Kiss and Say Goodbye (The Manhattans); Disco Lady (Johnnie Taylor); You Sexy Thing (Hot Chocolate); Misty Blue (Dorothy Moore)
Rock	3	Mississippi (Pussycat); Smile (Pussycat); Georgie (Pussycat)
Hard rock	2	Bohemian Rhapsody (Queen); Love Hurts (Nazareth)
Europop	2	Dancing Queen (ABBA); Mamma Mia (ABBA)
Eurodisco	2	Dancing Queen (ABBA); SOS (ABBA)
Schlager	2	Fernando (ABBA); Moviestar (Harpo)

=== Top Labels ===
The following shows the most common record labels that a single was associated with. Any label that only had one single has not been noted.

Label	Total	Singles
EMI	6	Bohemian Rhapsody (Queen); Mississippi (Pussycat); Devil Woman (Cliff Richard); Smile (Pussycat); Georgie (Pussycat); Come On Over (Olivia Newton-John)
Columbia Records	4	Kiss and Say Goodbye (The Manhattans); Disco Lady (Johnnie Taylor); If You Leave Me Now (Chicago); Tears On My Pillow (Johnny Nash)
Polar Music	4	Fernando (ABBA); Dancing Queen (ABBA); Mamma Mia (ABBA); SOS (ABBA)
Warner Bros. Records	3	December, 1963 (Oh What A Night) (The Four Seasons); Let Your Love Flow (The Bellamy Brothers); Tonight's the Night (Gonna Be Alright) (Rod Stewart)
Capitol Records	3	Boogie Fever (The Sylvers); Fooled Around and Fell in Love (Elvin Bishop); Silly Love Songs (Wings)
Private Stock Records	2	A Fifth of Beethoven (Walter Murphy); You Sexy Thing (Hot Chocolate – US release)
RSO Records	2	Disco Duck (Rick Dees & His Cast of Idiots); You Should Be Dancing (Bee Gees)
Rocket	2	Don't Go Breaking My Heart (Elton John & Kiki Dee); Devil Woman (Cliff Richard)

=== Top songwriters ===
The following shows the songwriters who had the most top-selling singles of 1976 in New Zealand.

Writer	Total	Singles
Benny Andersson	4	Fernando (ABBA); Dancing Queen (ABBA); Mamma Mia (ABBA); SOS (ABBA)
Björn Ulvaeus	4	Fernando (ABBA); Dancing Queen (ABBA); Mamma Mia (ABBA); SOS (ABBA)
Stig Anderson	4	Fernando (ABBA); Dancing Queen (ABBA); Mamma Mia (ABBA); SOS (ABBA)
Werner Theunissen	3	Mississippi (Pussycat); Smile (Pussycat); Georgie (Pussycat)
Harry Wayne Casey	2	(Shake, Shake, Shake) Shake Your Booty (KC and the Sunshine Band); I Love to Love (But My Baby Loves to Dance)

=== Most/Least songwriters ===
The following shows the singles that were credited as having been written by only one person and the singles that had the most credited writers of 1976.

Single	Total	Songwriter/s
"Bohemian Rhapsody" (Queen)	1	Freddie Mercury
"Shannon" (Henry Gross)	1	Henry Gross
"Disco Duck" (Rick Dees & His Cast of Idiots)	1	Rick Dees
"Slipping Away" (Max Merritt & The Meteors)‡	1	Max Merritt
"Disco Lady" (Johnnie Taylor)	3	Harvey Scales; Albert Vance; Don Davis
"December, 1963 (Oh What a Night)" (The Four Seasons)	2	Bob Gaudio; Judy Parker

=== Top producers ===
The following shows the producers who had the most singles to appear on this chart.

Producer	Total	Singles
Benny Andersson	4	Fernando (ABBA); Dancing Queen (ABBA); Mamma Mia (ABBA); SOS (ABBA)
Björn Ulvaeus	4	Fernando (ABBA); Dancing Queen (ABBA); Mamma Mia (ABBA); SOS (ABBA)
Eddy Hilberts	3	Mississippi (Pussycat); Smile (Pussycat); Georgie (Pussycat)
Gus Dudgeon	2	Don't Go Breaking My Heart (Elton John & Kiki Dee); Silly Love Songs (Wings – co-producer)
Harry Wayne Casey	1	(Shake, Shake, Shake) Shake Your Booty (KC and the Sunshine Band)
Richard Finch	1	(Shake, Shake, Shake) Shake Your Booty (KC and the Sunshine Band)
