= Dan Costello =

Dan or Daniel Costello may refer to:

- Dan Costello (baseball) (1891–1936), American baseball player
- Dan Costello Snr, pioneer of tourism in Fiji
- Dan E. Costello (1909–?), member of the Illinois House of Representatives
- Daniel Rae Costello (1961–2019), Rotuman Fijian guitarist based in Samoa
- Danny Costello (born 1975), English boxer
