= Benny Neyman =

Dutch singer

- Neyman in 1978

Background information
- Born: 9 June 1951
- Origin: Maastricht, Netherlands
- Died: 7 February 2008 (aged 56) Soesterberg, Netherlands
- Genres: Pop music, schlager
- Years active: 1974–2007

Wilhelmus Albertus "Benny" Neyman (9 June 1951 in Maastricht, Netherlands – 7 February 2008 in Soesterberg, Netherlands) was a Dutch singer.

== Biography ==
Neyman was born in Limburg. In the beginning of the 1970s, he took a course at Kleinkunst Academy in Amsterdam. Neyman's first success came in 1980 with the song Ik weet niet hoe. Several follow up singles also became hits, like Vrijgezel and Je hoeft me niet the zeggen hoe ik leven moet. In 1985 Neyman scored his biggest hit with Waarom fluister ik je naam nog (number 1 position in some Dutch charts). From the second half of the 1980s Neyman had no major hits. However he still released a large number of albums and had several successful musical tours. Neyman received a Golden Harp in 1996. In 1999 Benny sang a duet with Dutch country singer Toni Willé (Pussycat) "Oh, How I Miss You" and recorded the album "American Duets" with her in 2000 which was released in 2001.

Neyman had been open about his sexual orientation from an early age, and was seen as a gay icon in the Netherlands. In 2005 he performed at the celebration for the Gay Krant (a Dutch LGBT publication).

His health began to decline in 2006. After his previous manager quit, his partner Hans van Barneveld in 2006 became his new manager. In October 2007 his last album Onverwacht was released and his last performance, a tribute to the deceased Conny Vandenbos, took place on 2 December 2007. Neyman announced on 21 December 2007 that he suffered from an advanced form of cancer and that his prognosis was not clear. On 7 February 2008 Benny Neyman died at 56 years of age. He was cremated in Leusden, and several artists performed during the ceremony, including Lenny Kuhr.

Posthumously, his partner of 25 years, Hans van Barneveld, compiled a 5-cd and 2-DVD box set Adieu-Oeuvre Overzicht 1974-2007 which was released by CNR Music.
