= Toni Willé =

Dutch country pop artist (born 1953)

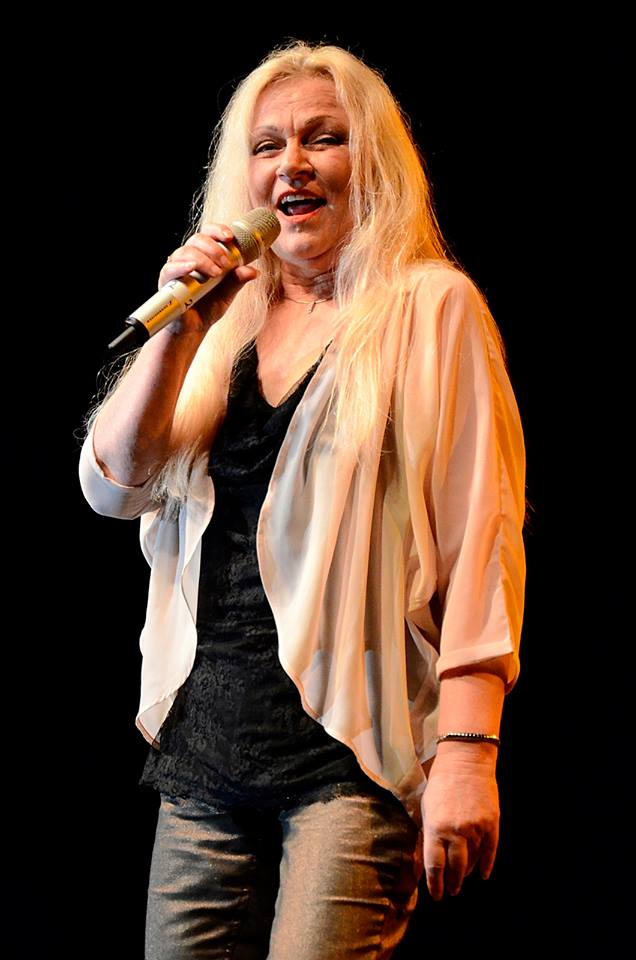
- Toni Wille at NDR 1 Niedersachsen Oldies, Aurich, Germany, (October 2013)

Background information
- Born: 26 June 1953 (age 73); Treebeek, Netherlands
- Genres: Pop, Country
- Occupation: Singer-songwriter
- Years active: 1963–present
- Label: EMI Bovema
- Formerly of: Zingende Zusjes, The BGs from Holland, Sweet Reaction, Pussycat
- Website: https://pussycatonline.nl/

"Like a Child" (2006)
"Like A Child" from the album 'Fantastic Stories' was recorded in 2006 is a radio version with a more pop style instrumentation

"Impressions" (2012)
"Impressions" dedicated to Music Composer Werner Theunissen recorded in 2012 has Toni singing in a much fuller voice incorporated with soft ballad instrumentation

Toni Willé (full name Antonia Johanna Cornelia Veldpaus; born 26 June 1953) is a Dutch country pop artist who was the lead vocalist of Pussycat, the musical group that also included her two elder sisters and achieved an international No.1 hit with the song "Mississippi" in 1975/76.

== Childhood ==
Toni is the third daughter of Marie Verheijen and Toon Veldpaus. Toon died from Hodgkin's disease shortly before Toni's birth, when her sister Marianne was two years old and Betty was only one. Three years later her mother Marie married Stefan Kowalczyk, a Polish miner who came to the Netherlands in 1948 to work in the coal mines after serving in the US Army in Germany. He brought up the children and promoted their music talents.

When Toni, Betty and Marianne were six, seven and eight, the family moved to Treebeek, a city quarter in Brunssum in the south-east Netherlands. At the annual children's festivities of Sinterklaas, he bought them each an acoustic guitar and engaged Ben Keuzenkamp as guitar tutor. With guitars, they performed during carnivals, talent scoutings and parties as The Singing Sisters. It was during this time that their characteristic close harmony style singing came into being. Their repertoire initially consisted mostly of German pop songs. However they say, this kind of music soon ended with the arrival of The Beatles.

A few years later, Keuzenkamp introduced the sisters to 18-year-old Werner Theunissen, a guitarist from 'The Entertainers' whom he got in touch with through an ad in the papers. Theunissen acquainted them with contemporary pop music. It was then that they became a proper girl band with Betty on solo guitar, Marianne on bass, Toni on vocals and a friend Tonny Jeroense on drums.

== Musical career ==
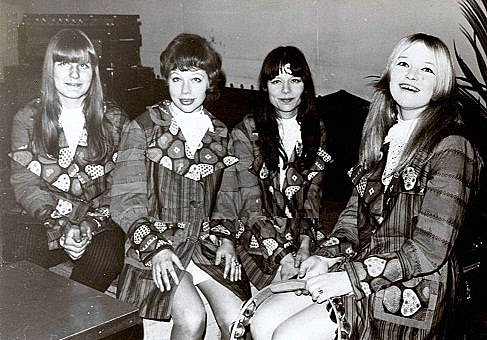
The BGs from Holland – in the late 1960s (Left to Right) Tonny Jeroense, Marianne, Betty and Toni Veldpaus

Toni's career as lead vocalist of Pussycat started with her two older siblings, Betty and Marianne Veldpaus as The Singing Sisters (Zingende Zusjes) in 1963.

When the beat-era came, The Singing Sisters changed their style. It was around this time they introduced a female drummer, Tonny Jeroense, and began to call themselves 'The BGs' or 'The Beat Girls from Holland', one of the first female groups in the Netherlands. They sang Bee Gees and Motown songs with close harmony and so people referred to them as the Dutch Bee Gees. They practised in the garage under their house. The sisters recollect those days as being the best time of their lives. They even performed in the French part of Belgium. To make their travelling easier, their parents bought them a minivan along with some music equipment.

A few years later, they recruited male members to the band. In 1973, the new ensemble led by guitar teacher Werner Theunissen was renamed 'Sweet Reaction'. The members now included Toni and her two sisters along with Lou Willé (guitarist from a band called Ricky Rendall and His Centurions), and Hans Lutjens (drummer from a band called Scum). Werner, their composer continued writing songs with three part vocals. In the same year, Sweet Reaction released their first single "Tell Alain" on the 'Telstar label owned by Johnny Hoes. Although the single was unsuccessful as it didn't sell well, they ended up performing it on Eddy Becker's 'The Eddy-Go-Round Show'. Apart from Demis Roussos, another guest on that show was Soulful Dynamics which had a big hit with the song "Mademoiselle Ninette" at that time. With their Belgian producers, Toni's band the 'Sweet Reaction' recorded the song "Come Back my Dream", the successor of "Tell Alain". This song achieved reasonable success and acclaim. Soon after this success, Johnny Hoes released "Daddy" under his record label which was their third single in a row. It was around this time the band seemed to urgently need a name change. So when the single "Daddy" was released, underneath the band name on the cover it read in glaring letters "Now Pussycat". After this, Toni went on to record a solo single called "Let me Live my life", backed by "For You" under the moniker 'Sally Lane'. However, this single was not a success either.

== Pussycat ==
Although we started as a hobby, we had to build a professional organization due to the success of "Mississippi". That wasn't so easy, especially when we started touring. We even went to South Africa. But after some time it became increasingly difficult to finance huge tours with that size of a group. During that time it also became popular to work with a tape instead of live musicians. With pain in our hearts we parted company with our backing band and started to perform with a tape. By 1985 my sisters wanted to spend more time for themselves and so we all agreed that stopping with Pussycat was the best thing to do.

— Toni recollects when asked about the final years of Pussycat.

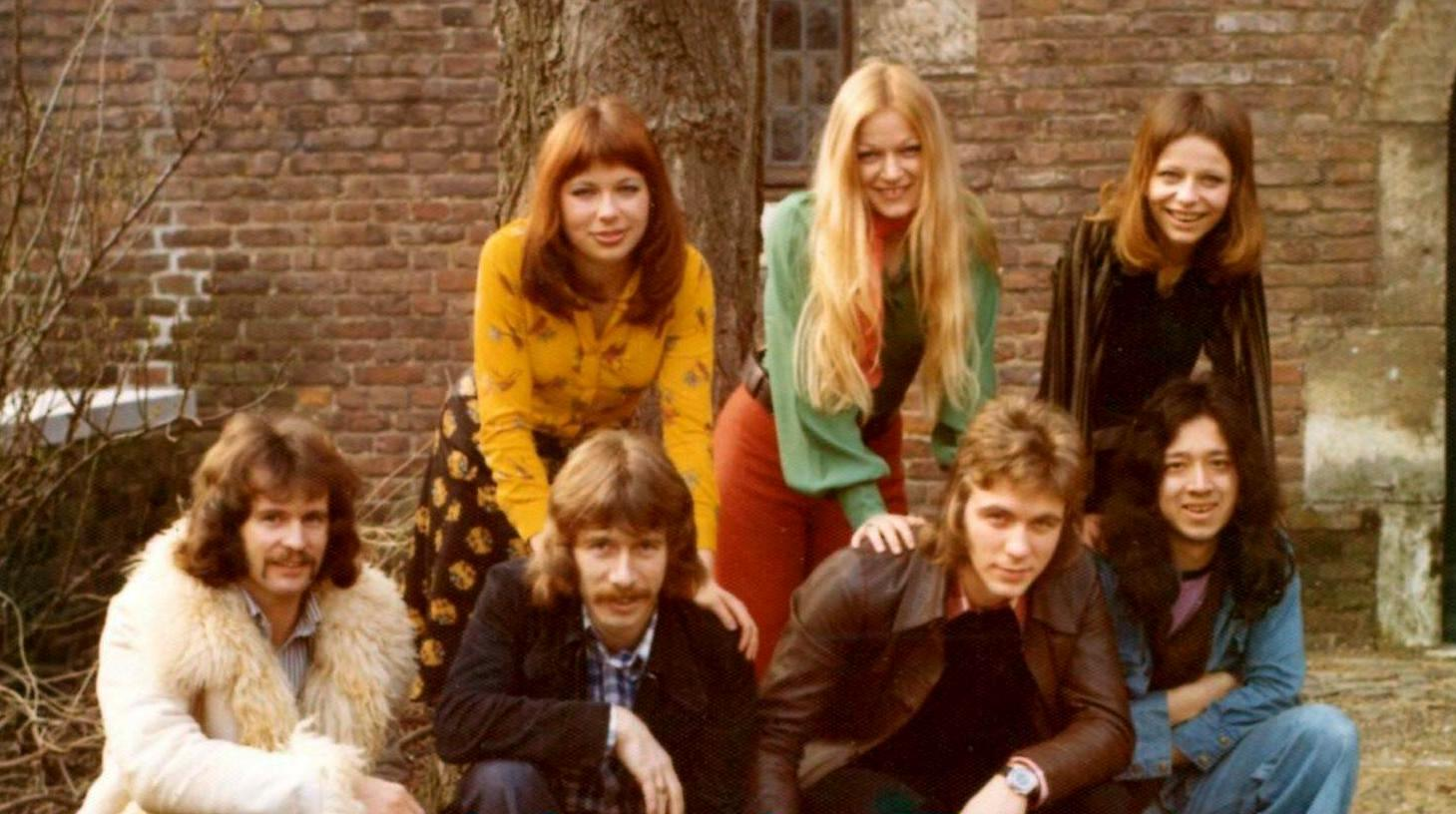
Pussycat Members in 1975 (standing) Marianne, Toni and Betty (seated from right) Lou, Theo, Werner and John

In 1975, EMI Bovema took Pussycat under contract with Toni as lead singer along with her two sisters as backing vocalists accompanied by Lou Willé (guitarist), Theo Wetzels (bassist), John Theunissen (guitarist), Theo Coumans (drummer from 1975 to 1978) and later Hans Lutjens (drummer from 1978). With EMI arranger Eddy Hilberts as producer, the new name Pussycat finally started taking its new shape. Their first hits were all written and composed by Theunissen.

The name Pussycat will forever be linked to the 1976 number 1 hit "Mississippi". Although the band from Limburg, featuring the three sisters, had many more hits in the following years, "Mississippi" is still considered to be the band's undisputed masterpiece. In 1976 it remained for four weeks at No. 1 in Britain (UK Singles Chart) and Germany and from there all over Europe, Latin America, Australia, Africa and Asia. Four million singles were sold in 1976. It was the most sold record in Germany. In Brazil, "Mississippi" stayed in the charts for 129 weeks. It became No. 1 in 30 countries from Europe to South Africa. More than 5 million copies were sold worldwide. On 5 January 1977, Pussycat was awarded the Conamus Export Prize by the British Ambassador to the Netherlands, Sir John Barnes, for being the first Dutch pop group in the British charts.

Their follow-up Georgie reached at No.4 in the Netherlands, "Smile" (also in 1976) went to No.2 and My Broken Souvenirs, both became No. 1 hits in the Top 40. These songs were translated into German for single release in Germany. They also released a German version of "Mississippi". But it did not do as well as the English version. Apart from these songs, they also came out with German versions of "Take Me, Take Me" (Heute Heute Heute) and "Pasadena". With "Same Old Song" and "Doin' La Bamba" both huge hits of the 1980, they were able to get a taste of the old Motown songs once more. During the following 10 years, six albums and 17 singles were produced, all successful.

Pussycat continued to record albums and singles as well as perform all over the world throughout the late '70s and early '80s before breaking up in 1985. Betty focused on raising a family, Marianne became the owner of a bar in Brunssum, and Toni, who has a son and daughter, is the only one who pursued a professional career in music. In 1999, however, the three of them got back together to perform at several reunion concerts. More recently Pussycat contributed to the country band Major Dundee's single "Somewhere Someone" in 2005 and singer Dennis Jones' Dutch reggae cover of their signature hit song "Mississippi" in 2007.

== The story behind Mississippi ==
The success of "Mississippi" overwhelmed us. We were more or less knocked out by it, because we never dreamed that the debut was such a strong one. As a matter of fact, we weren't ready for it. Pussycat was a kind of a hobby for us then. For instance, I was still working. Our lives went on an overdrive. We could not keep our jobs as typists as we were dragged all over the place, from one show to the other. "Mississippi" has made all our dreams come true. Everywhere the three of us go, we still get asked to sing it. Over the years we may have sung the song over ten thousand times, but we will never get tired of it!.

— Toni remembering the commotion around their debut.

The particular country sound in our songs certainly has to do with our voices, which contain a country like warmth. But we can just as easily sing jazz or black music preferably old fashioned soul. Our producer Pim Koopman was also partly responsible for our change of sound.

— Toni talks about the country sound in their music

"Mississippi" was another song composed by Werner Theunissen. It was written in the same vein as "Massachusetts" by the Bee Gees, a song he liked very much. The band started to play the song live for a few months and later they sent a demo of it to EMI Bovema in Heemstede, who were immediately interested. They ended up re-recording the song in the EMI Studio. But this did not work out as planned. Their producer at that time Eddy Hilberts who had success with a repertoire of country songs gave a country like twist to the song. Personally the sisters did not have anything with country music, although influenced by the Eagles, they liked country rock.

"Mississippi" was released as a single in April 1975. Initially, it did nothing, until Meta de Vries, the Dutch radio jockey started playing it. She thought Pussycat was an English band. Hans Van Willigenburg played the song on his radio programme as well. During his broadcast, he would play three new songs, after which listeners could vote by postcard which artist should be invited to his studio. They voted for Pussycat. The group also performed the song for the TV show 'Herkent U Deze Tijd' by Kick Stokhuyzen. The same week the single entered the Top 40 in November 1975. The following week, they performed "Mississippi"' at TopPop and a week later, the single had climbed to # 1. Although Toni and Marianne still worked as typists for DSM, they were unable to maintain their jobs as besides the Netherlands, "Mississippi" had become No. 1 in Germany as well. As their fame grew, the band realized they needed a manager, so their record company got them their new manager Jan Buys.

Oddly enough, at first they did not want to release the single in Germany nor UK because of the initial lack of interest. Eventually, the single was released in the UK on Sonet, a small record label. In the Autumn of 1976, the single was number 1 in the UK charts.

In addition to the Netherlands, Germany and UK, the single was #1 in Austria, Switzerland, Norway and Brazil. Though this song never became a hit in the United States, it was covered by a number of American artists such as Barbara Fairchild and Lucille Starr.

== 1985 – Going solo ==
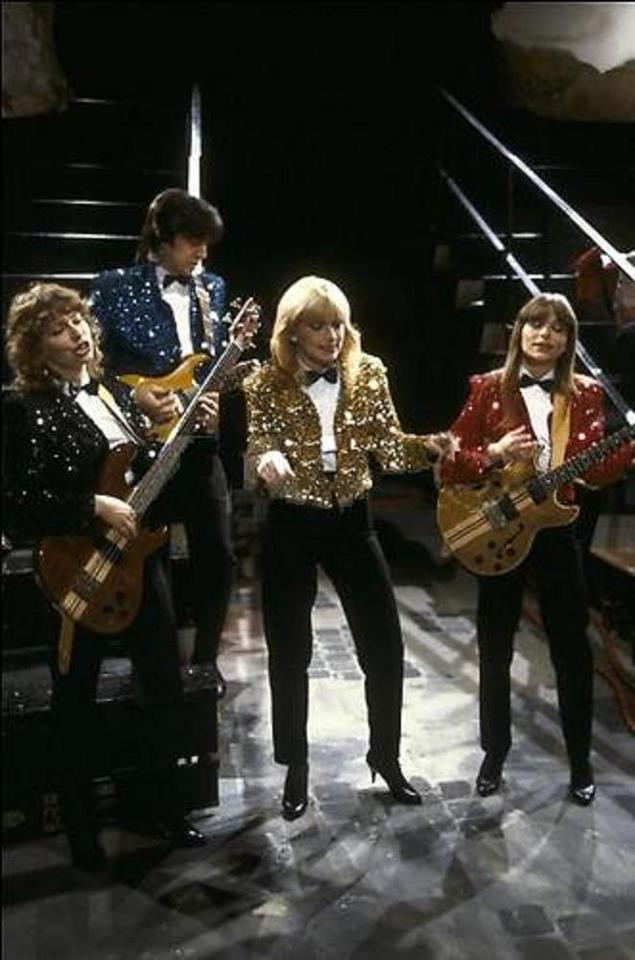
Marianne, Lou, Toni and Betty as the final line up of Pussycat in 1982

By 1981, it became popular for artists to perform with a tape instead of a backing band as this was much cheaper and more attractive for venue owners. So Toni and her sisters had no choice but to part with their backing band, reducing the group to only Toni, Betty, Marianne and Toni's husband Lou Willé. Their new producer was now Pim Koopman.

A few more hits and in the meantime, family life started to take effect within the band. Betty had a little child and so had Toni. This was partly the reason they were unable to accept invitations to visit Japan, Australia and Singapore, although they managed to schedule a one-month trip to South Africa. The group finally disbanded in the year 1985.

Toni had a successful solo career covering songs by Chris Rea and Anne Murray on her albums. Three solo albums appeared: "Privilege" in 1985, "Working Girl" in 1987, and "New Words to an Old Love Song" in 1989. She recorded a number of solo albums and recorded duets with famous artists like Marco Bakker, Benny Neyman and Major Dundee Band. She recorded two singles with singer and songwriter Dick Van Altena of Major Dundee Band: "It turned Out To Be You" in 1990 and "Raised on Love" in 1995. In 1999 she recorded "Mama", a single written by Dick Van Altena that appeared on many albums including Diverse Artiesten – De Geschiedenis Van De Limburgse Popmuziek 3, a compilation of songs from Dutch artists from Limburg. The Rarities bonus CD contains part of Toni's solo work. Besides "Love in a Heatwave", the theme of the film De Flat starring Rene Soutendijk, it also contains "Heart Half Empty", the duet with Danny Vera.

In 2007, Toni sang "I Wanna Love You" from her new album "Fantastic Stores" as a duet with Jess Robin on the Slovenian breakfast TV show.

With her album Pussycat – The Collection and More she re-recorded the hits of Pussycat with "I'll be your woman" along with new songs like the ballads "Desperado", "Still on my mind" and the Elkie Brooks hit, "Pearl's a Singer".

== Accolades ==
Toni's first accolade came with Pussycat in 1977, when the band won a Goldener Lowe Award in Germany and subsequently an Edison and a Silver Harp in the Netherlands, awarded to them by the Dutch Ambassador.

Privilege in 1985 was followed by Working Girl in 1987 and New Words to an Old Love Song in 1989 for which the Dutch magazine Country Gazette named her best female country singer of the year and the album became the best country CD of that year. She received the same accolade in 1990, 1991 and 1992. She sang the theme song "Love in a Heatwave" for the movie thriller De Flat in 1994.

== Comeback ==
Besides the 'Single Luck' Television programme which focuses on the success of 'Mississippi', we also get requests for interviews and shows. Although we are certainly willing to accommodate these requests, we will only do the things we like. This means that we might do the occasional Pussycat show, but there will be no real comeback. As of now, we limit our singing to our hobby band and to birthdays and family parties.

— Toni and her sisters confirming in 1995 that they will be no official comeback.

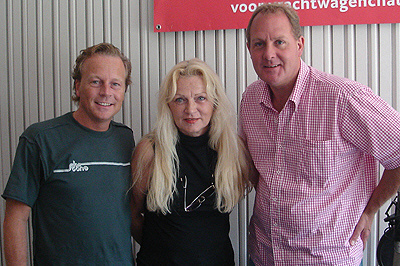
Toni Willé in a radio interview programme with Dennis Jones (left) at Radio Nederland Wereldomroep in 2007

In 1995 Toni and her sisters appeared on the Single Luck program where they looked back at the success of "Mississippi".

In 2001, they held a reunion show at the Zomerparkfeest in Venlo, to a stubborn crowd of 30,000. In 2005, they get together again to back "Somewhere Someone" for the band Major Dundee's album Young Gods, with whom Toni had performed in 1995. She also features in another song with them titled "You Ain't What You Ain't" from the same album.

In late February 2001 the double CD – 25 Years After Mississippi (25 Jaar Na Mississippi) appeared. It had the hits and best album tracks in chronological order. In March the same year, EMI released on CD all original Pussycat LPs.

In 2004 EMI released Pussycat – The Complete Collection on DVD, a box which contains three CDs and a DVD with all the hits plus extra tracks complemented by a booklet of 40 pages.

In 2007 the sisters backed Dennis Jones' reggae cover of "Mississippi" which was produced by Kees Tel. The sisters also featured in a video clip with him in The Making of Mississippi as well as for the cover version of the same song. In the same year, Toni also met Jones on a radio tour with Radio Nederland Wereldomroep to promote her newly solo album Fantastic Stories as well as "Mississippi", which was Dennis's first single.

== Recordings in 2000s ==
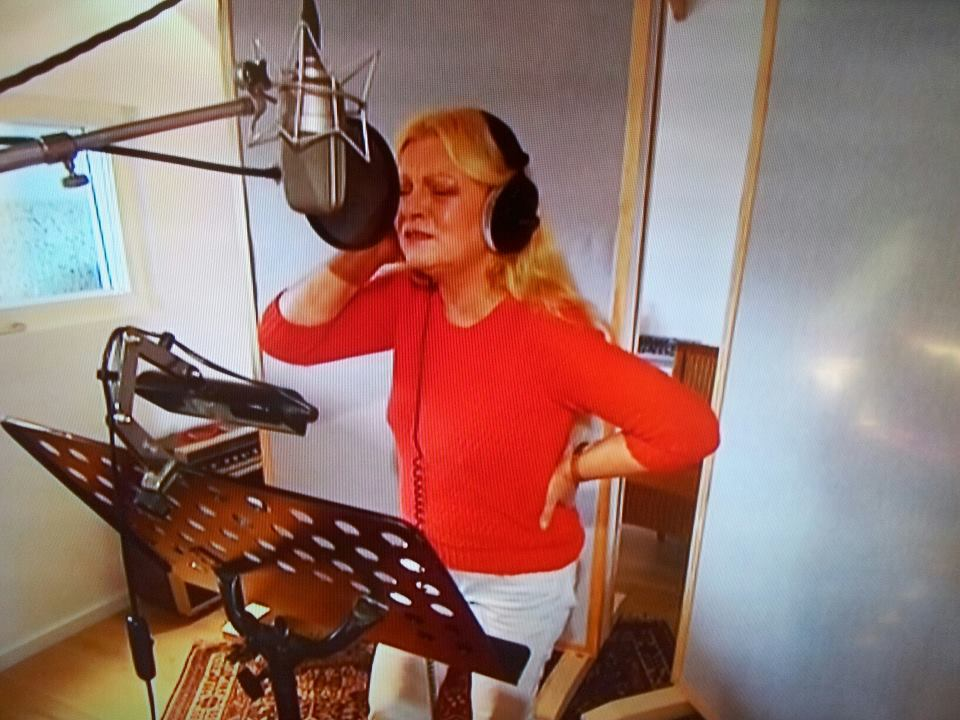
Toni Willé in recording studio recording her single "Happy" with songwriter Paul Logister in 2012

Toni sang "Oh, How I Miss You" with Benny Neyman and recorded the album American Duets with him in 2000. In 2004 she sang "Heart Half Empty" with Danny Vera. She also worked with singer Jo Smeets on a Dutch and English duet mix titled "Maedjes van 50" (Girls in their Fifties) which was included in the Dutch album released in 2009 that featured artists from her native Limburg titled Diverse Artiesten – Limburg Allein Deil 3.

In 2006, she recorded 14 songs for the album "Fantastic Stores", 11 songs for Worlds United in 2009, and a third in 2012 released as a single called "Impressions". dedicated to Werner Theunissen, who died on 18 January 2010, in Great Britain of heart failure.

She recorded an album with Fijian artist Daniel Rae Costello called "Let the World Sing" and released her Fiji tour live concert album on DVD as The Golden Memories Tour, Fiji in 2010. This album contains the song "Impressions" which was the last Theunissen had written for her.

Toni recorded a duet "Our Love is So Big" with Eddy Hilberts, the producer of Pussycat, for his dance album 'Honey come on, Dance with Me' in 2011. The CD was released in July 2013 on iTunes

In 2012, Toni recorded two singles – "Happy" and "What Love can Do" – with songwriter and composer Paul Logister. They were released in August 2013 on iTunes.

== At present ==
Toni lives in Brunssum. She has two children, Nick and Kimberly, and a granddaughter, Genyva.

In October 2006, she performed for 15,000 people at the Köln Arena in Cologne together with Chris Andrews and Harpo. She also gives concerts in countries including Bulgaria, Slovenia and Greece.

On 15 July 2010 she performed in Fiji at two shows organized by Fijian artist Daniel Rae Costello and his band The Cruzez at the Vodafone Arena, Suva and the Denarau Golf and Racquet Club, Nadi, respectively, as part of the Golden Memories Tour concert. At the shows, Toni sang "Bad Boy", "Mississippi", "Smile", "Same Old Song" and "Georgie". Costello and The Cruzez played hits such as "Take Me to the Island" and "Samba".

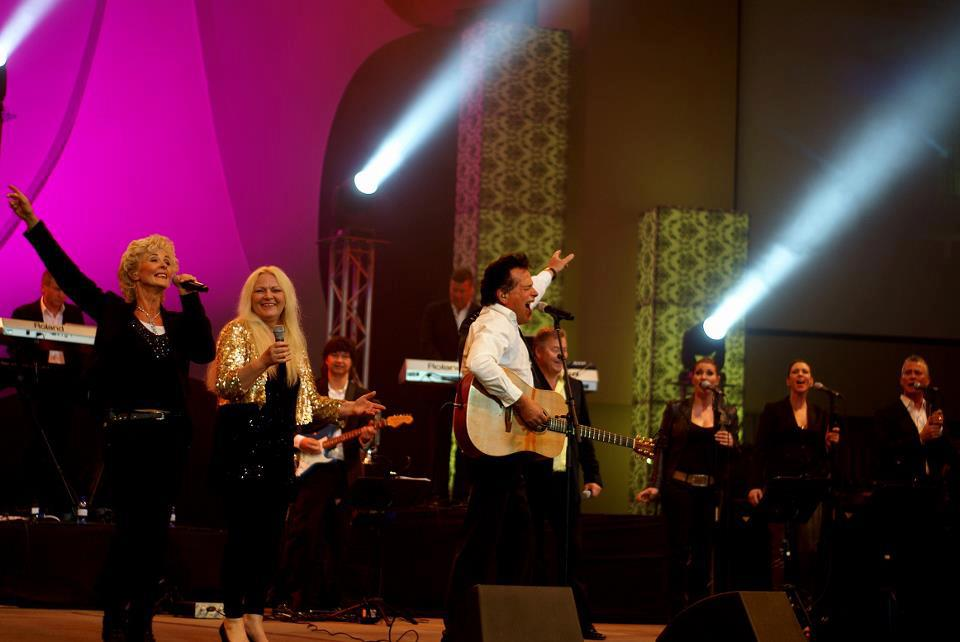
Toni Willé with George Baker and BZN at Moreleta Park, Pretoria, South Africa on 12 May 2012

On 12 May 2012, Toni shared stage with George Baker and Jan Keizer & Anny Schilder in "Goue Stemme in Koncert" (Golden Voices in Concert), presented by King Entertainment in the theatre of Moreleta Park in Pretoria, South Africa. She was backed by Dutch vocalists Lana Wolf, Pien Schneider and Ewan Mack. She sang a Pussycat medley for the first time in 15 years since her last visit. She also sang "Mississippi" in celebration of the 35th anniversary of the song.

On 27 September 2013, she returned to South Africa to perform at the Clover Aardklop festival at Potchefstroom. There she entertained the screaming crowds with "Mississippi", "Georgie" and "My Broken Souvenirs" with Steve Hofmeyr, Nadine and other South African singers. On 5 October 2013, she performed at the Stellenbosch Dorpstraat Restaurant Theatre, Western Cape, South Africa with backing vocals from the South African singers.

She took part in the NDR 1 Niedersachsen Oldie Show at Lower Saxony at seven concert halls of Lower Saxony, sharing the stage with Smokie, Middle of the Road, the Tremeloes and the Smashing Picadillys.

Toni's live stage performance on 12 July 2014 at the Americana International Festival, Prestwold Airfield, Loughborough, U.K., was met with positive audience reception. Numbers she performed included "Mississippi", "Georgie", "Raised on Love" and "That will be the day" (originally sung by Buddy Holly). Other artists from USA, UK and Europe included Chas'n'dave, The Country Sisters (CZ), Bo Walton, T.Rextasy and Lazy Dog among many others who performed a mixture of Rock 'n' Roll, country, R&B, Blues and Alternative Music of the previous five decades.

== Discography ==
Album Cover Art for 'Fantastic Stories'

Album Cover Art for 'Worlds United'

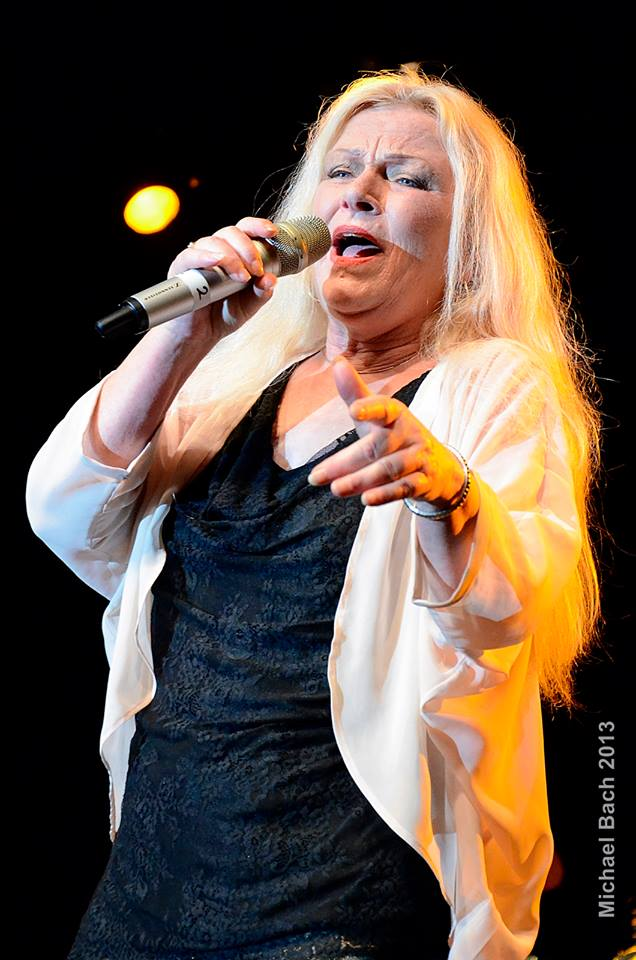
Toni Willé at the NDR 1 Niedersachsen oldies show, Aurich, Germany (October 2013)

=== Albums – Toni Willé ===
- Golden Memories Tour, Fiji (2010)
- Worlds United (2009)
- Fantastic Stories (2006)
- Country Duets with Major Dundee (2005)
- American Duets – Benny Neyman & Willé (2001)
- New Words to an Old Love Song (1989)
- Working Girl (1987)
- Privilège (1985)

=== Top singles – Toni Willé ===
- "Happy" (2013)
- "Impressions: dedicated to composer Werner Theunissen" (2012)
- "Doin' la Bamba" (2012)
- "Mississippi" (2012)
- "I Wanna Love You" (2012)
- "Dreaming of a Christmas With You" (2012)
- "Like a Child (Radio Version)" (2012)
- "Can't Get Over You" (2012)
- "Fantasy" (2012)
- "Never Wanna Lose" (2012)
- "I'm Only Dreaming" (2012)
- "As Long As You Are Mind (Radio Version)" (2012)
- "Time Slips Away (Radio Version)" (2012)
- "Good Times" (2005)
- "Somewhere Someone / Slow Train – The Major Dundee Band & Toni Willé with Pussycat" (2004)
- "Heart Half Empty – Danny Vera & Toni Willé" (2003)
- "What If I Say Goodbye – Benny Neyman & Toni Willé" (2001)
- "Two Piña Coladas – Benny Neyman & Toni Willé" (2001)
- "Oh, How I Miss You Tonight – Benny Neyman & Toni Willé " (1999)
- "Raised on Love – The Major Dundee Band & Toni Willé" (1995)
- "Love in a Heatwave" (theme song for Motion Picture 'De Flat') (1994)
- "It Turned out to be You / Sometimes Love – The Major Dundee Band & Toni Willé " (1990)
- "Good Year for the Roses / The Writing on the Wall" (1989)
- "Roll On / Help Me Make It Through The Night" (1989)
- "Incredible You / Drift Away" (1989)
- "Falling in and out of Love / Working Girl" (1987)
- "Sweet Music to my Soul / What do you do to Me" (1987)
- "Out of Reach / Have You Ever" (1986)
- "Every Beat Of My Heart / Sunday Sunrise" (1985)
- "Hungry Nights / Sail Away" (1985)
- "We'll Put the World Together Again / What's Forever For – Marco Bakker & Toni Willé" (1982)

=== Compilations – Pussycat feat. Toni Willé ===
- De Top 10 Van: Pussycat feat. Toni Willé (2011)
- Pussycat – The Complete Collection (2004)
- Hollands Glorie: Pussycat feat. Toni Willé (2001)
- 25 Jaar Na Mississippi: Pussycat feat. Toni Willé (2001)
- The Very Best of Pussycat: Pussycat feat. Toni Willé (1996)
- The Collection & More: Pussycat feat. Toni Willé (1994)

=== Albums – Pussycat ===
- Pussycat – First Of All (1976)
- Pussycat – Souvenirs (1977)
- Pussycat – Wet Day In September (1978)
- Pussycat – Simply To Be With You (1979)
- Pussycat – Blue Lights (1981)
- Pussycat – After All (1983)

=== Vinyl singles – Sweet Reaction ===
- "Come back my dream / Call me Maria" (1970
- "Tell Alain / If it's only love" (1971)
- "Daddy / Tell Alain" (1975)
- "Daddy / It's long ago" (1977)

== Music charts ==
=== Toni Willé music in the Dutch charts ===
| Date | Position | Title | Weeks |
|---|---|---|---|
| 25 December 1999 | 49 | Neyman & Willé – Oh, How I Miss You Tonight (Single) | 5 |
| 31 March 2001 | 78 | Neyman & Willé – American Duets (Album) | 2 |

=== Pussycat album in the Dutch charts ===
| Date | Position | Title | Weeks | Label |
|---|---|---|---|---|
| 24 March 2001 | 26 | 25 jaar na Mississippi | 7 | EMI |
| 6 June 1981 | 10 | Blue Lights | 15 | EMI |
| 17 April 1976 | 4 | First Of All | 21 | EMI |
| 14 May 1977 | 6 | Souvenirs | 8 | EMI |
| 5 November 1994 | 60 | The Collection & More | 3 | EMI |
| 23 September 1978 | 16 | Wet Day in September | 7 | EMI |

=== Pussycat singles in the German charts ===
| Date | Position | Title | Weeks | Top 10 | Label |
|---|---|---|---|---|---|
| 26 January 1976 | 1 | Mississippi | 32 | 21 | EMI |
| 6 April 1976 | 1 | Mississippi * | 16 | 8 | EMI |
| 12 April 1976 | 24 | Mississippi (dtsch) | 8 | – | EMI |
| 19 April 1976 | 6 | Georgie | 24 | 16 | EMI |
| 21 April 1976 | 14 | Mississippi (dtsch) | 6 | – | EMI |
| 5 May 1976 | 8 | Georgie * | 16 | 4 | EMI |
| 7 July 1976 | 18 | Georgie (dtsch) | 2 | – | EMI |
| 27 September 1976 | 9 | Smile | 27 | 6 | EMI |
| 30 September 1976 | 22 | Smile * | 8 | – | EMI |
| 15 December 1976 | 10 | Ein Altes Lied | 8 | 2 | EMI |
| 7 February 1977 | 41 | Ein Altes Lied * | 2 | – | EMI |
| 17 April 1977 | 41 | My Broken Souvenir | 2 | – | EMI |
| 18 April 1977 | 22 | My Broken Souvenir * | 10 | – | EMI |
| 16 August 1977 | 13 | Abschiedssouvenir | 4 | – | EMI |
| 21 December 1977 | 38 | If you ever come to Amsterdam | 6 | – | EMI |
| 1 September 1978 | 9 | Wet Day in September | 10 | – | EMI |
| 15 September 1980 | 46 | Doing La Bamba | 2 | – | EMI |

*=Airplay Charts

== See also ==
- List of country music performers
- List of Dutch musicians
- List of performers on Top of the Pops
- List of artists who reached number one on the UK Singles Chart

| Year | Title |
|---|---|
| 2013 | Good afternoon Limburg |
| 2013 | TVL HoogstPersoonlijk met Toni Willé on YouTube |
| 2012 | Pussycat Documentary on YouTube |
| 2011 | Ellermanns Morning Show on YouTube |
| 2010 | Pussycat Documentary on YouTube |
| 2007 | Dennis Jones & Pussycat – The making of Mississippi on YouTube |
| 1994 | Pussycat Interview on YouTube (Single Luck Part 1, 2, 3) |
