= Daniel Rae Costello =

- Daniel Rae Costello in 2010

Background information
- Born: 17 June 1961
- Origin: Suva, Fiji
- Died: 22 July 2019 (aged 58)
- Instruments: Guitar

Daniel Rae Costello (17 June 1961 – 22 July 2019) was a Rotuman Fijian guitarist based in Samoa.

== Personal life ==
Born in Suva, Fiji, Costello, along with his brother, attended high school in Whangārei, New Zealand. His mother, Jessie Rae was of Rotuman and Scottish descent whereas his father, Dan Costello, was Irish; both were born in Fiji. He was brought up in Tavua. His father owned a cattle ranch. He moved with his family to Lautoka when he was 5 and lived there for the rest of his life. He and his younger brother Vince started a band called The Fleet Swingers when he was in Grade 7; his brother was the lead singer.

Costello completed his last year of school in Suva, Fiji, at Marist Brothers High School, where he won that year's talent contest. He later performed at Suva Grammar School as a guest artist, and there met his future wife, Corrina. After winning a few talent contests, he joined a small group called The Beachcomber Boys who performed daily at the Beachcomber Island Resort.

In 2014, Costello moved permanently to Samoa.

== Music ==
In 1979, Costello recorded his first solo album, called Tropical Sunset, which flopped. Three years later, his album, Lania which was a huge success in Fiji and around the Pacific. After his mother died in 1985, he changed his name to Daniel Rae Costello. He moved to Australia a few years later because of the 1987 Coup where he wrote two songs, Samba and Take me to the Island and returned to Fiji and started his own Studio and Production Suite called "Tango Sound Productions" and recorded his first big hit album, Samba.

Costello recorded 30 albums. He was an accomplished songwriter, composer, arranger, audio engineer, vocalist, musician and producer in the Pacific region. He recorded an album with Toni Willé from the Dutch group Pussycat, called Let The World Sing. The first single, originally a hit for Pussycat Georgie gained numerous airplays on Fiji radio.

At the 2020 Pacific Music Awards, Costello was posthumously awarded a lifetime achievement award.

== Discography ==
- 1979 Tropical Sunset
- 1982 Lania
- 1993 Jungle Walk (WMR)
- 1994 Rockin Island Hits
- 2004 The Beach Party
- 2007 Moondance
- 2008 Let The World Sing
- 2008 Cruzin'
- Footprints in the Sand
- Wind of Change
- Calypso Man
- My Island Home Rotuma
