= Bob Altena =

Dutch decathlete

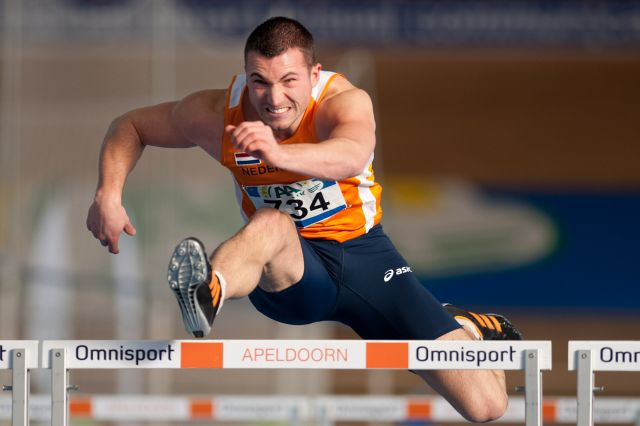
- Altena in 2011

Personal information
- Born: 11 February 1986 (age 40) Brunssum, Netherlands
- Height: 1.85 m (6 ft 1 in)
- Weight: 76 kg (168 lb)

Achievements and titles
- Personal best(s): 100 m - 11.26 (2006); 400 m - 50.55 (2006); 1000 m - 2:40.96 (2005 (indoors)); 1500 m - 4:30.58 (2005); 110 m hurdles - 14.61 (2006) high jump - 1.86 (2004) pole vault - 4.80 (2007) long jump - 7.17 (2004) shot put - 14.37 (2007) discus throw - 42.40 (2006) javelin throw - 57.65 (2006) decathlon - 7621 (2006)
- Updated on 25 September 2006

Bob Altena (born 11 February 1986 in Brunssum, Limburg) is a Dutch decathlete, whose greatest achievement was a ninth place at the 2004 World Junior Championships in Athletics.
