= Brunssum =

Brunssum Broensem
- Municipality
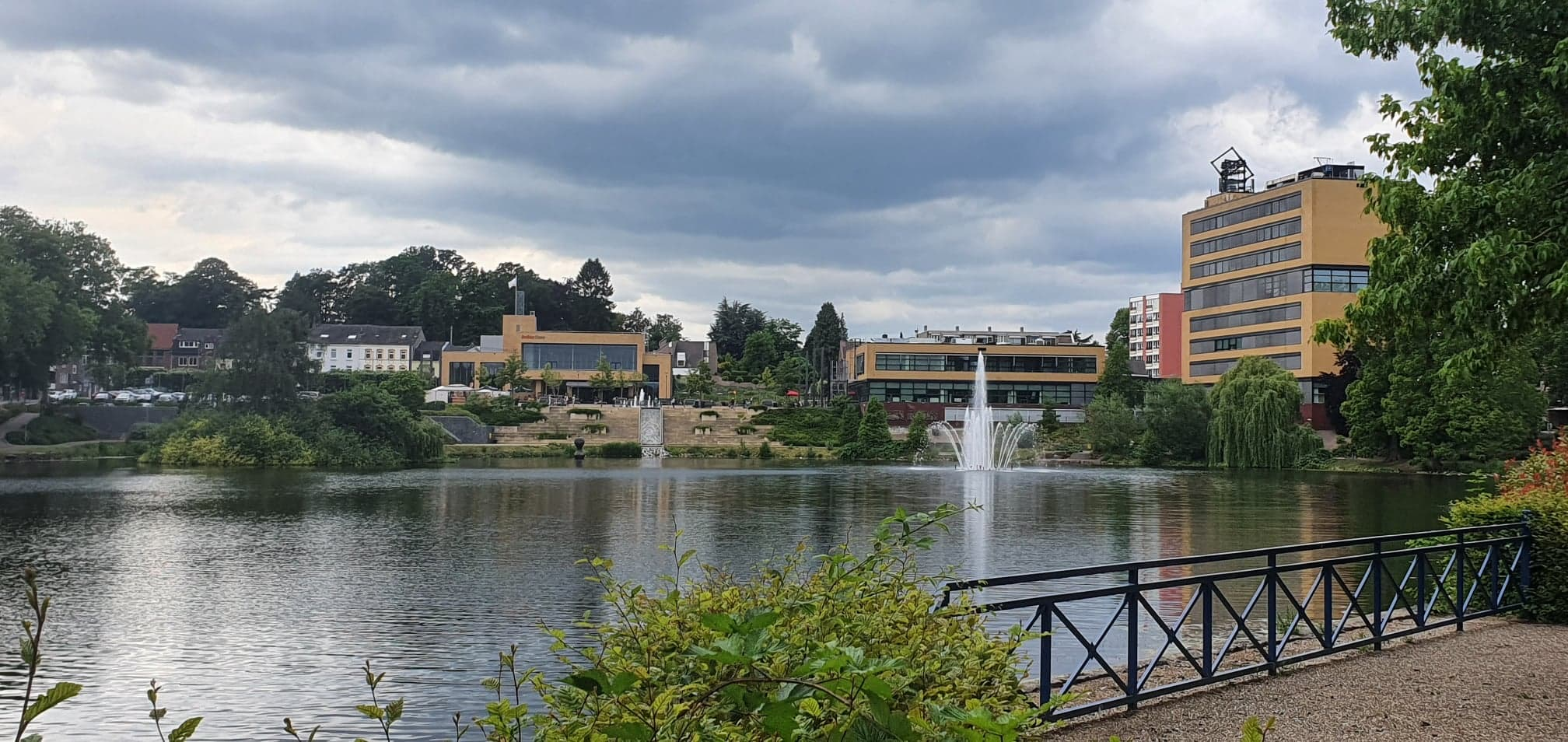
- Vijverpark (Pond park) in Brunssum centre

- Flag Coat of arms

- Location in Limburg
- Coordinates: 50°57′N 5°58′E
- Country: Netherlands
- Province: Limburg

Government
  - Body: Municipal council
  - Mayor: Wilma van der Rijt (CDA)

Area
  - Total: 17.34 km^{2} (6.70 sq mi)
  - Land: 17.25 km^{2} (6.66 sq mi)
  - Water: 0.09 km^{2} (0.035 sq mi)
- Elevation: 81 m (266 ft)

Population (January 2021)
  - Total: 27,670
  - Density: 1,604/km^{2} (4,150/sq mi)
- Demonym: Brunsummer
- Time zone: UTC+1 (CET)
  - Summer (DST): UTC+2 (CEST)
- Postcode: 6440–6446
- Area code: 045
- Website: www.brunssum.nl

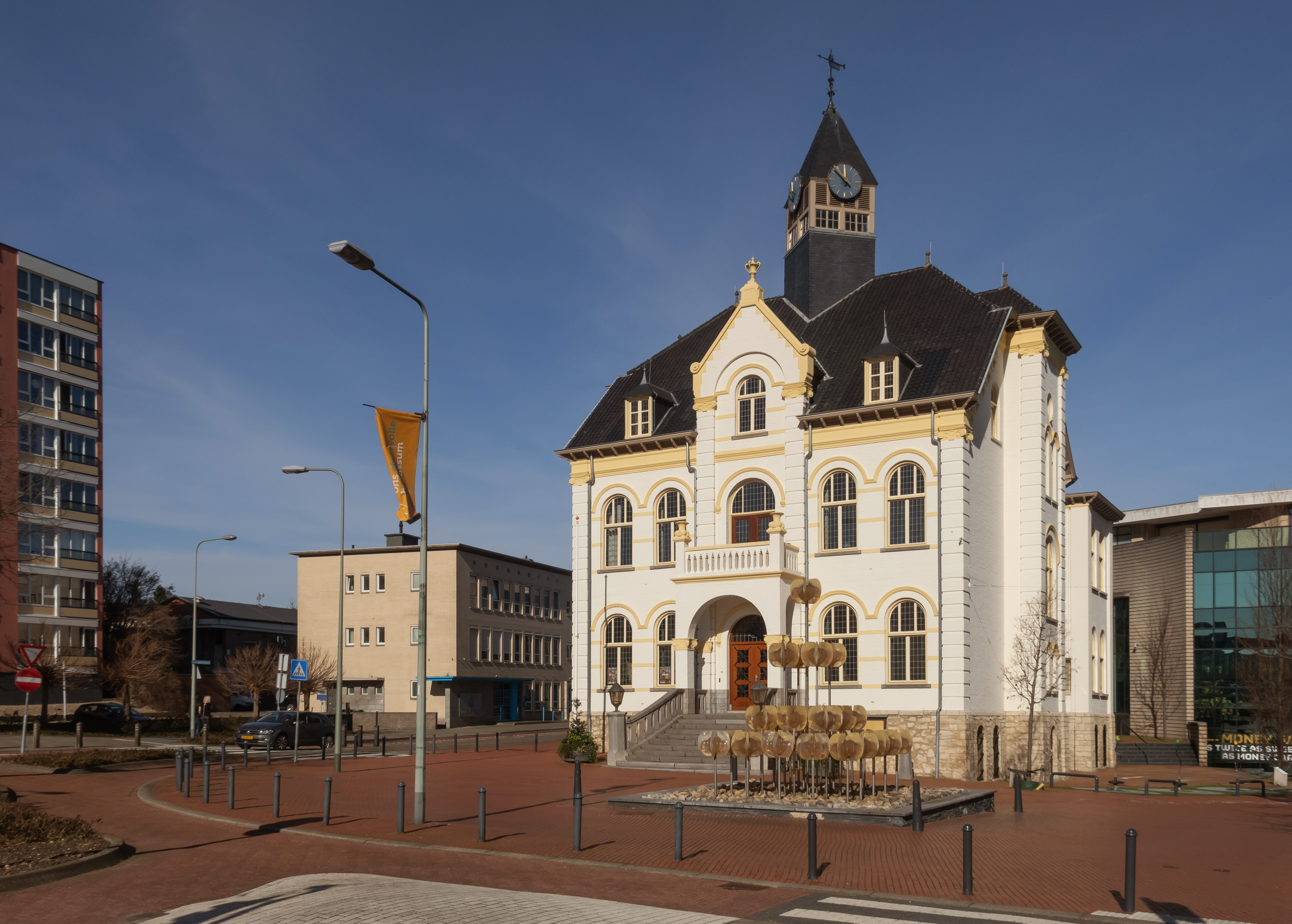
Brunssum, townhall

Brunssum (Dutch: [ˈbrʏnsʏm]; Limburgish: Broensem) is a municipality and a town in the province of Limburg in the Netherlands. The municipality of Brunssum has 27,670 residents as of 2021.

Brunssum was a center of coal mining until 1973.

== Population centres ==
- Brunssum
- Bouwberg
- De Kling
- Haansberg
- Kruisberg
- Langeberg
- Onder-Merkelbeek
- Rumpen
- Treebeek

== Topography ==
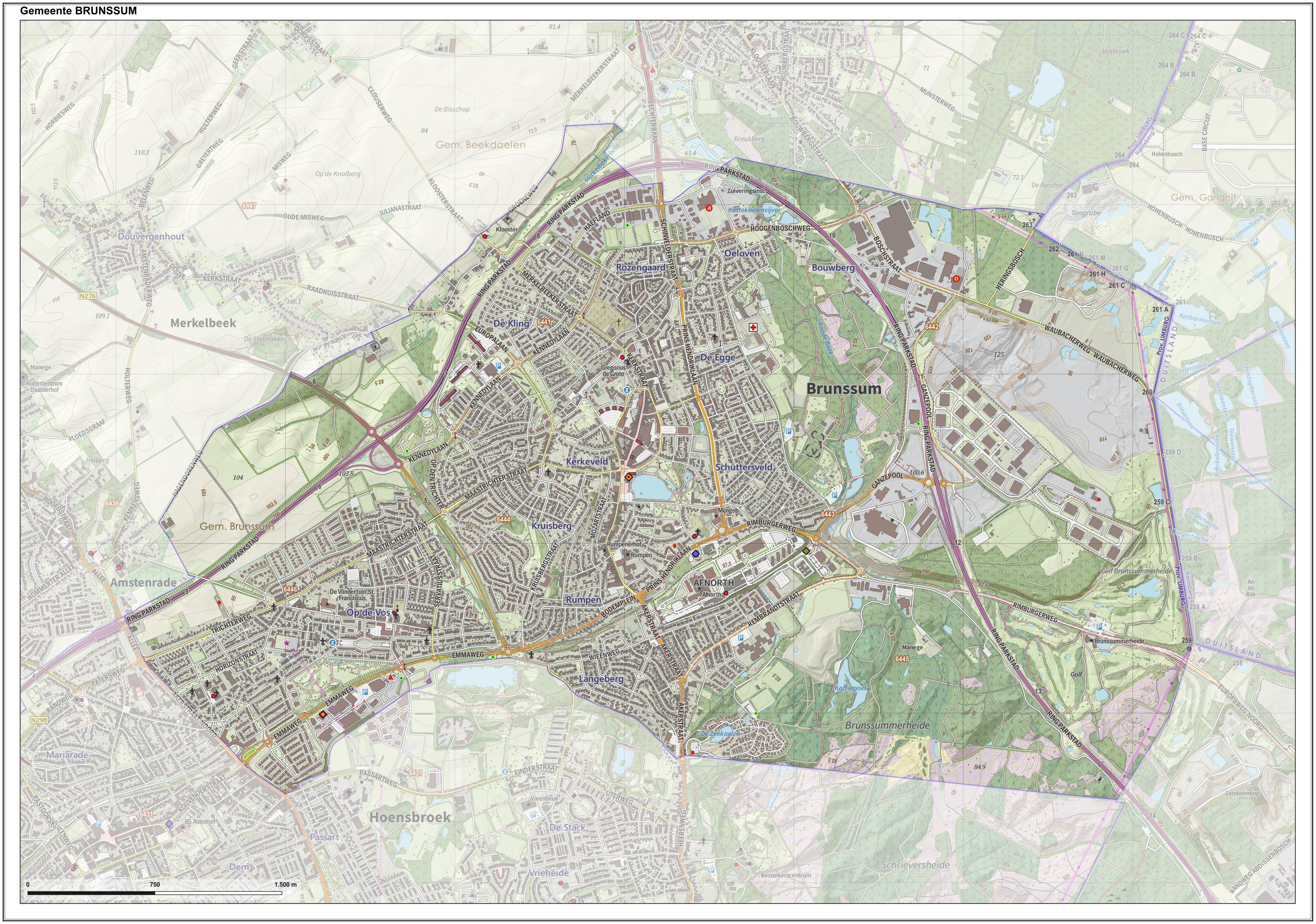
Map of Brunssum, June 2015

== History ==
There are indications of activity going back to prehistory in the Brunssum area and in the neighboring municipalities of Heerlen and Landgraaf. Little is known about this habitation, but soil findings and medieval records indicate a continuous occupation of the area over the past 2,000 years.

In the Middle Ages, ground fortification were erected in the Schutterspark for protection.

The parish of Brunssum has been known since 1150, and together with Schinveld and Jabeek it formed a magistrate within the Land of Valkenburg. In 1557 the magistrate of Brunssum, consisting of Brunssum, Schinveld and Jabeek, was pledged by the Spanish government to the Hoen van Amstenrade family, and in 1609 sold to Arnold III Huyn van Geleen. In 1664 the fiefdom Brunssum was absorbed in the land of Geleen and Amstenrade. At the end of the Ancien Régime in 1794, Brunssum became an independent municipality.

In 1150 there was already a Saint Gregorius church in the city center and in 1579 it was elevated to a parish church. The Saint Gregorius church has been rebuilt 4 times. The current church was built in 1961, in part financed by the Dutch State Mines, as the third church was severely damaged by soil settling as a result of coal mining activities.

The Brunssum city-arms is composed of the weapon of the Huyn family and the parish saint.

== NATO Joint Force Command Headquarters ==
Brunssum is the current home of Allied Joint Force Command Brunssum (JFC Brunssum), an operational level NATO headquarters one level below military-strategic level SHAPE in the integrated military command structure. There are three operational levels NATO headquarters; the other two are Allied Joint Force Command, Naples and Allied Joint Force Command Norfolk. The headquarters was known as Headquarters, Allied Forces Central Europe (HQ AFCENT) from its inception in Fontainebleau, France and relocation to Brunssum in 1967. The name was changed to Regional Headquarters, Allied Forces Northern Europe (RHQ AFNORTH) when a restructuring in 2000 led to the closing of HQ AFNORTH in Kolsås, Norway. The current title was adopted in 2004 to add flexibility to the military command structure by removing regional restrictions. The main base area, Hendrik Camp, was built on a former coal mine called Hendrik Mine.

Brunssum is also the home of the AFNORTH International School, located just outside Hendrik Camp. AFNORTH International School is a K-12 school that mainly provides service to American, British, Canadian, and German dependents of military personnel assigned to JFC Brunssum, the US Army base in Brunssum, and NATO Air Base in Geilenkirchen, Germany; as well as the former Soesterberg Air Base, Netherlands.

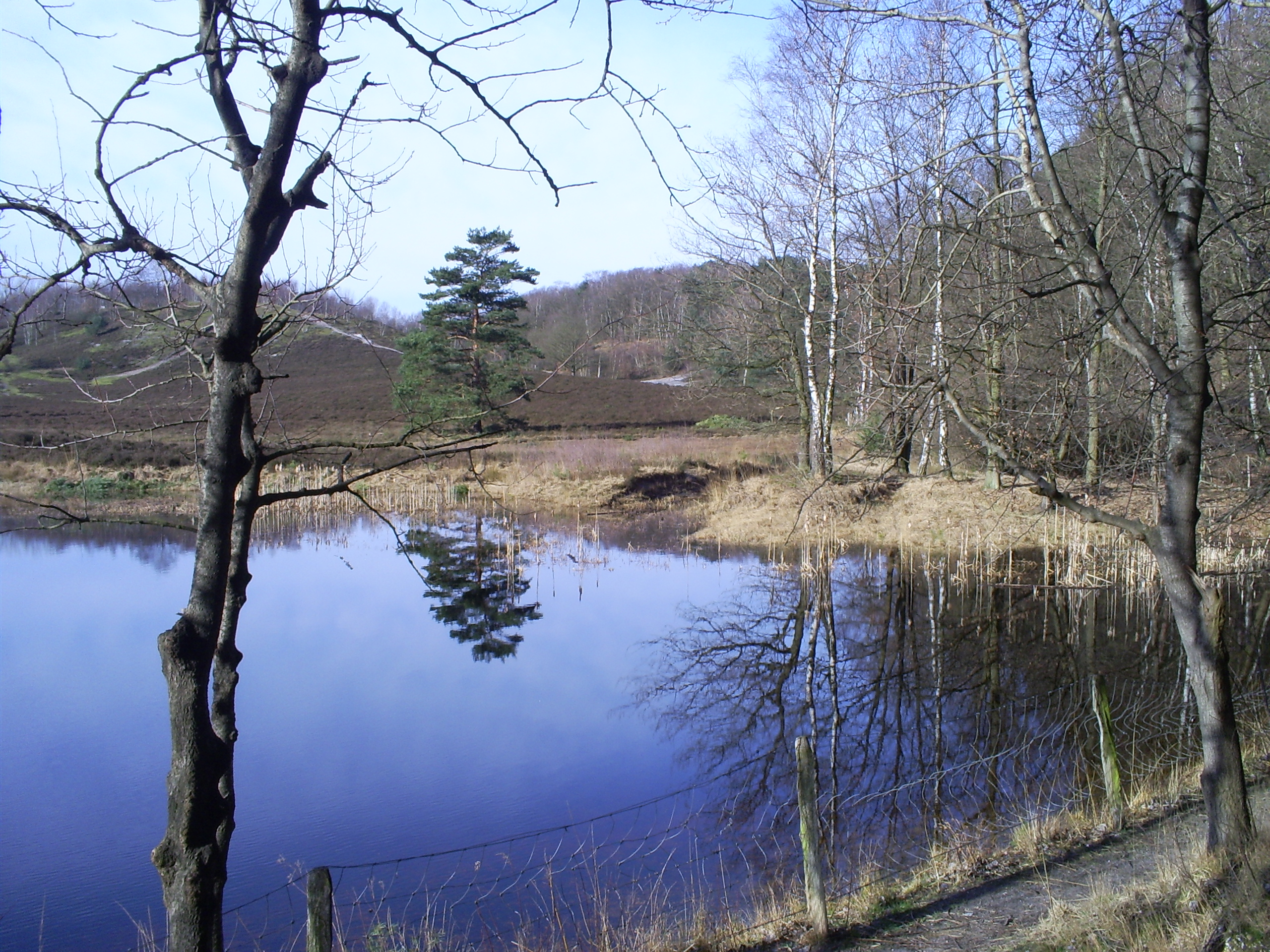
Brunssumerheide

== Nature ==
The Brunssummerheide is a sloping natural landscape with many trails for hiking and running. It is bisected by a brook called Roode Beek (Red Brook). The Brunssumerheide is a protected nature preserve.

It is the type locality of the fossil species Euryale lissa.

== Sports ==
One of the local football teams is BSV Limburgia, formerly known as SV Limburgia, which competes at an amateur level. As SV Limburgia, the club competed in the Eredivisie (Honorary Division) at various times and finished first in 1950. Upon the introduction of professional football in the Netherlands in 1954, SV Limburgia had little success and was relegated to the lowest level of Dutch football, Tweede Divisie (Second Division).

The annual Parelloop ten kilometer road running race is held in Brunssum. Micah Kogo from Kenya won the race in 2009, breaking the world record for that distance.

== People from Brunssum ==
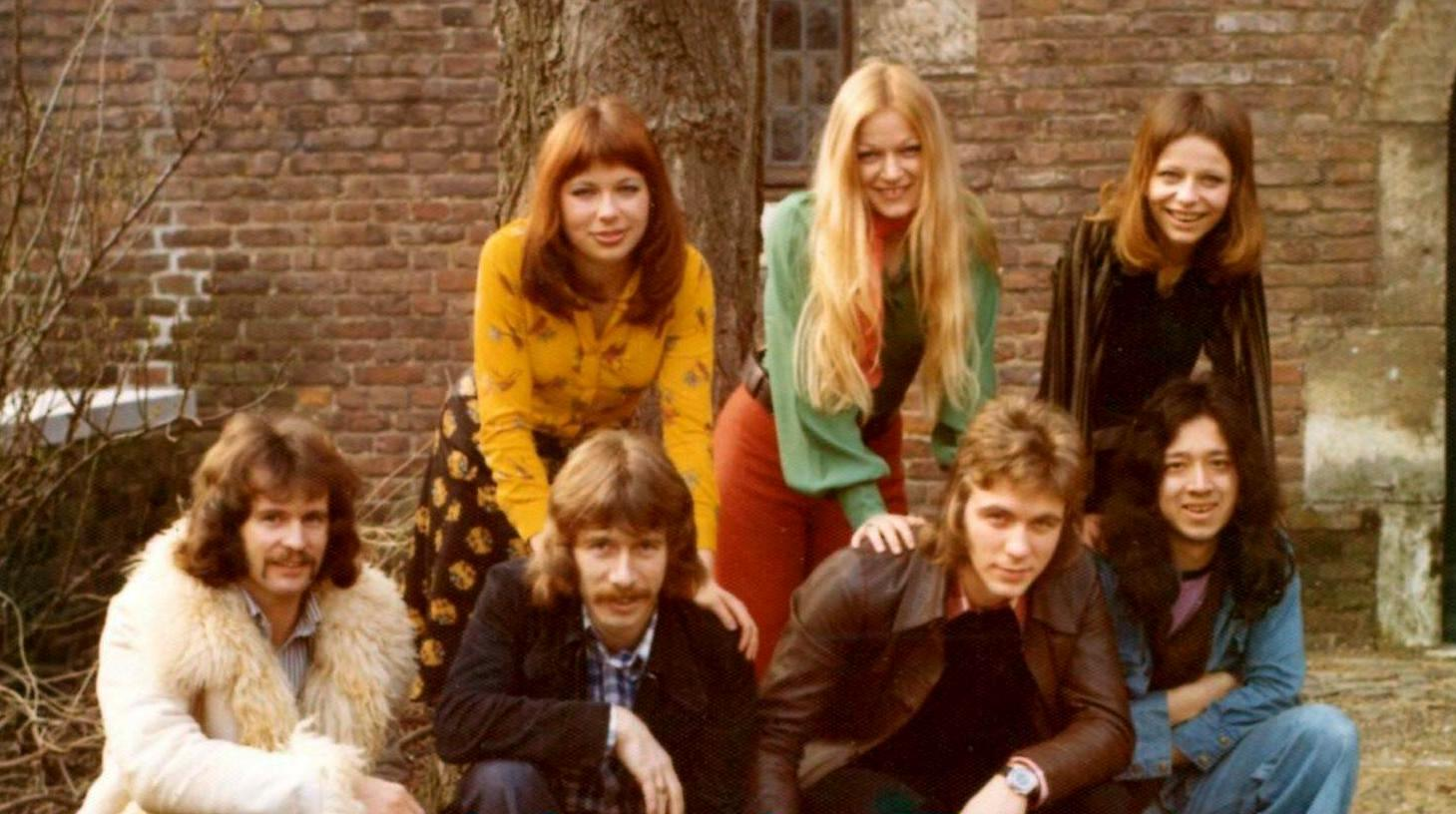
Pussycat, 1973

- Eugène Gerards (1940–2018) a Dutch-Greek footballer, manager and scout
- Jan Dietz (born 1945) an information systems researcher and academic
- Toni Willé (born 1953) a Dutch country pop artist, former member of Pussycat
- Pussycat a Dutch country and pop group (formed 1973) by the sisters Kowalczyk (Toni, Betty, Marianne)

=== Sport ===
- Ferenc Kocsur (1930–1990) a French-Hungarian footballer with 270 club caps
- Patrick Dybiona (born 1963) a former freestyle swimmer, competed at the 1988 Summer Olympics
- Frits de Graaf (1926–1998) a professionale footballer
- Nadine Hanssen (born 1993) a professional footballer
- Peter Hellenbrand (born 1985) a sport shooter, competed at the 2012 Summer Olympics
- Kevin Hofland (born 1979) a professional footballer
- Tom Daemen (born 1985) a professional footballer with 360 club caps
- Bob Altena (born 1986) a decathlete

== Gallery ==
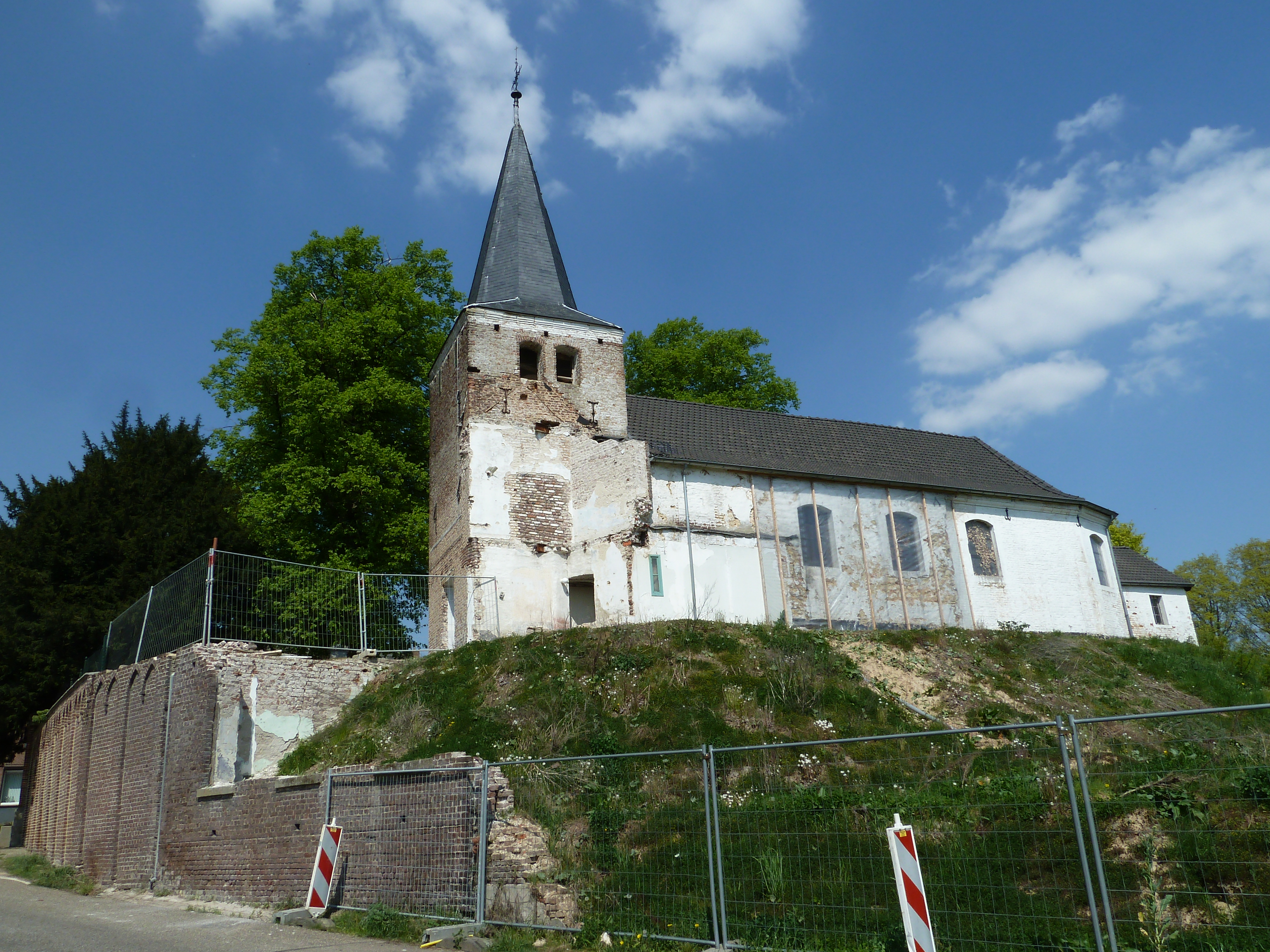
Brunssum, Sint Clemenskerk

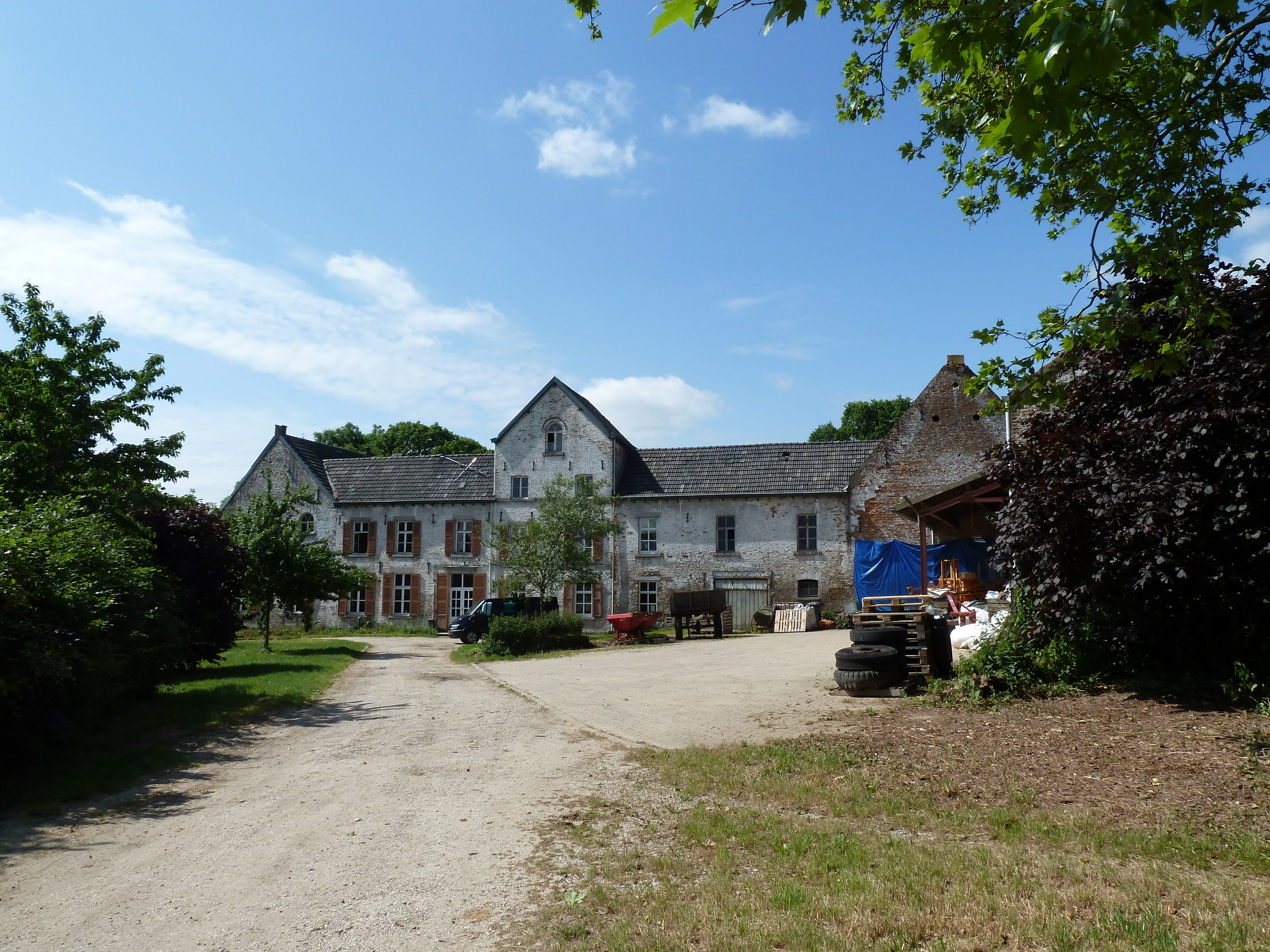
Brunssum, Groeneweg

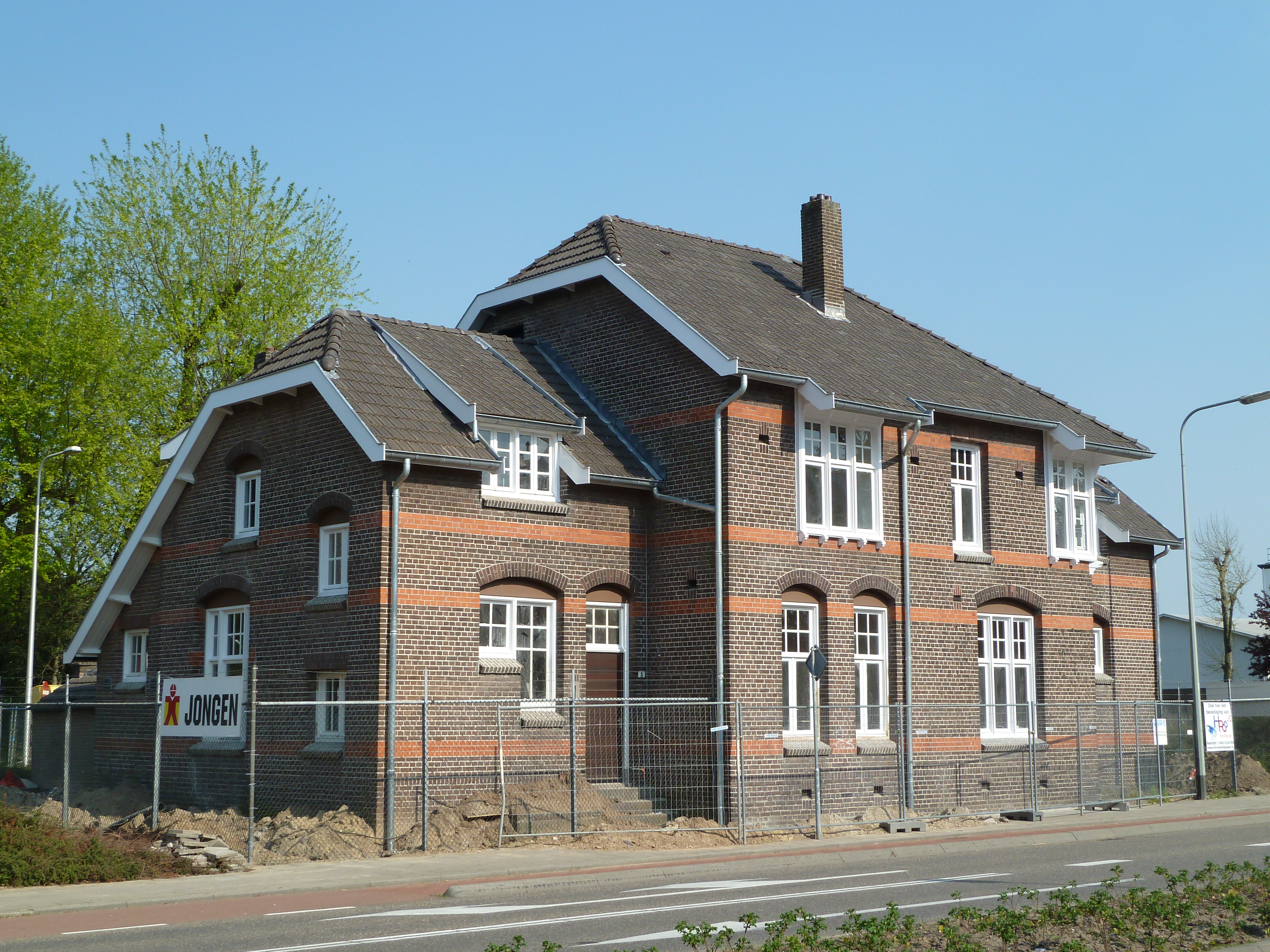
Brunssum, Akerstraat
