= Dan Costello Snr =

Fijian businessperson

Dan Costello Sr was a pioneer of tourism in Fiji. He died in the Gold Coast in Queensland, Australia in February 2010. He was one of the Pacific's major tourism pioneers and launched the Beachcomber Resort and Beachcomber Cruises back in the 1950s. He was a father of seven children and one of them was musician Daniel Rae Costello.
