= Werner Theunissen =

- Born: 12 May 1942; Heerlen, Netherlands
- Died: 18 January 2010 (aged 67) England, UK
- Genres: Pop, Country
- Occupations: Composer, songwriter
- Instrument: Guitar
- Years active: 1963–2010
- Label: EMI Bovema

Werner Theunissen (12 May 1942 – 18 January 2010) was a Dutch composer and lyricist of the 70s Dutch country music band "Pussycat". He rose to fame when his song "Mississippi", released by the band in 1975, became an international hit and sold an estimated 7 million copies worldwide.

== Musical career ==
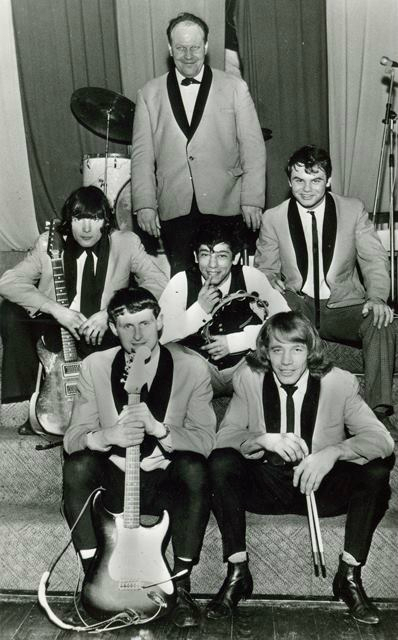
Werner Theunissen (first row, left) during his stint with 'The Rocking Apaches' in 1964

He began his musical career in the early sixties with 'The Rocking Apaches'. However, it was with the Indo – rock band from Heerlen called 'The Entertainers' that he wrote his first single. He also gave guitar lessons to three sisters Toni (later Toni Willé lead singer of Pussycat), Marianne and Betty Kowalczyk from Limburg who were around 10, 11 and 12 years old at that time. Werner got them acquainted with contemporary pop music. He discovered their talent and went on to write his first song for them called 'Bitte, Bitte, Liebe Mich'. Six years later in 1973 he formed the group 'Sweet Reaction' with the core of the group consisting of these three singing sisters, Lou Willé the guitarist from another band called Ricky Rendall and His Centurions along with two other musicians from a band called Scum. Recording came quickly to the nascent group. Within the same year as 'Sweet Reaction' they cut a single, "Tell Alain," for the Telstar label owned by Johnny Hoes which did not yield much success. But very soon with the next single and a string of well written and composed songs by Werner, this group was on its way to make history.

== Pussycat ==
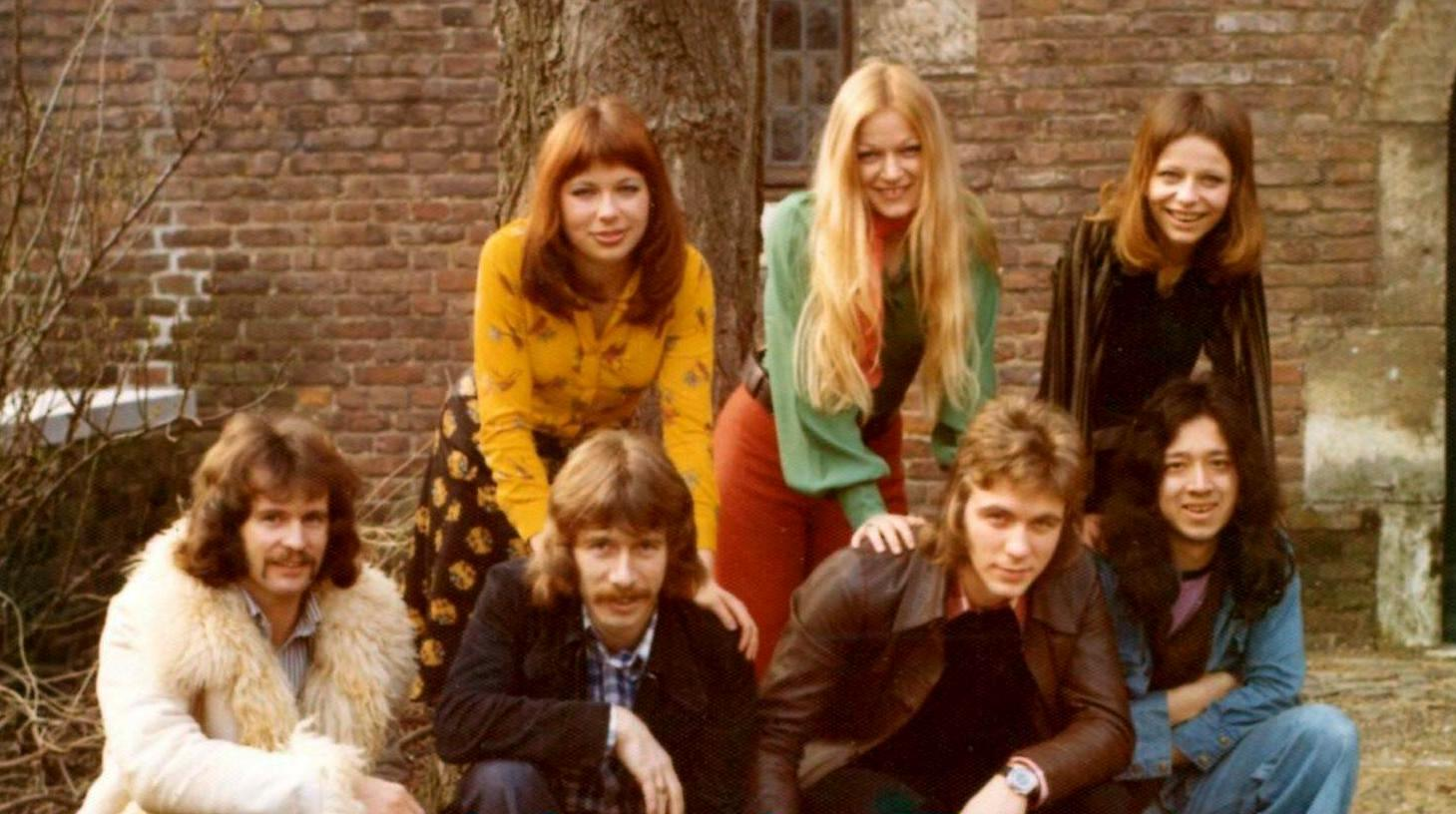
Werner Theunissen (seated second from left) with members of Pussycat

Under the name of Sweet Reaction, the group sent a demotape with three songs on it to EMI Bovema and one of them was "Mississippi". This song was written by Werner for the girls in 1969 being inspired by the Bee Gees song 'Massachusetts' but was shelved by him for a reason Werner himself describes as the demise of country music in favor of rock and pop. When listening to the tape, it was "Mississippi" that grabbed EMI Bovema's attention, and they decided to sign the band. EMI's arranger Eddy Hilberts became their producer. With the sisters still the core members of the group, by early 1975 they recruited drummer Theo Coumans, bassist Theo Wetzels and guitarist John Theunissen to update their image once again now finally emerging as Pussycat.

== Success of "Mississippi" ==
'Mississippi' was Werner's first single released under the 'Pussycat' banner. It was recorded in February 1975 in the EMI Bovema studios in Heemstede, Netherlands. The company was kind enough to postpone the recording sessions until after carnival, a festivity that is widely celebrated in the southern part of the Netherlands, to avoid the sisters having trouble with their voices as a result of celebrating carnival. 'Mississippi' was released in the Netherlands in the summer of 1975 backed with 'Do It' from the debut album by Pussycat. When Meta de Vries, a Dutch radio DJ played it on her radio show she received calls from various people inquiring about the song. Following this incident, they were invited to play the song in a Dutch TV quiz show hosted by Kick Stockhuyzen, as they had a question about the Mississippi River on the show and the broadcasting company thought it would be a nice idea to let Pussycat play 'Mississippi' right after the question. That's when things started to roll and by December 1975 the song became a massive hit seller at the Number One position in the Dutch charts, followed by the international success in 1976 pushing them into the charts across Europe and England as far as Africa and Australia, where it reached number one in August 1976. In South America alone, it even was charted for 129 weeks. 7 million copies were estimated to have been sold worldwide.

In the Netherlands, Pussycat was well sought after and Werner's songs yielded one hit after the other. During the following 10 years 6 hit albums and 17 singles, all of them almost equally successful. The follow-up of Werner's other hits after "Mississippi" were "Georgie" (1976) at No.4 in the Netherlands, and "Smile" (also in 1976) at No. 2. Both of these songs also charted in the United Kingdom. Some of his other well-known hits include "My Broken Souvenirs" (1977), "Wet Day in September" (1978) and "Doin'La Bamba" (1980).

== Accolades ==
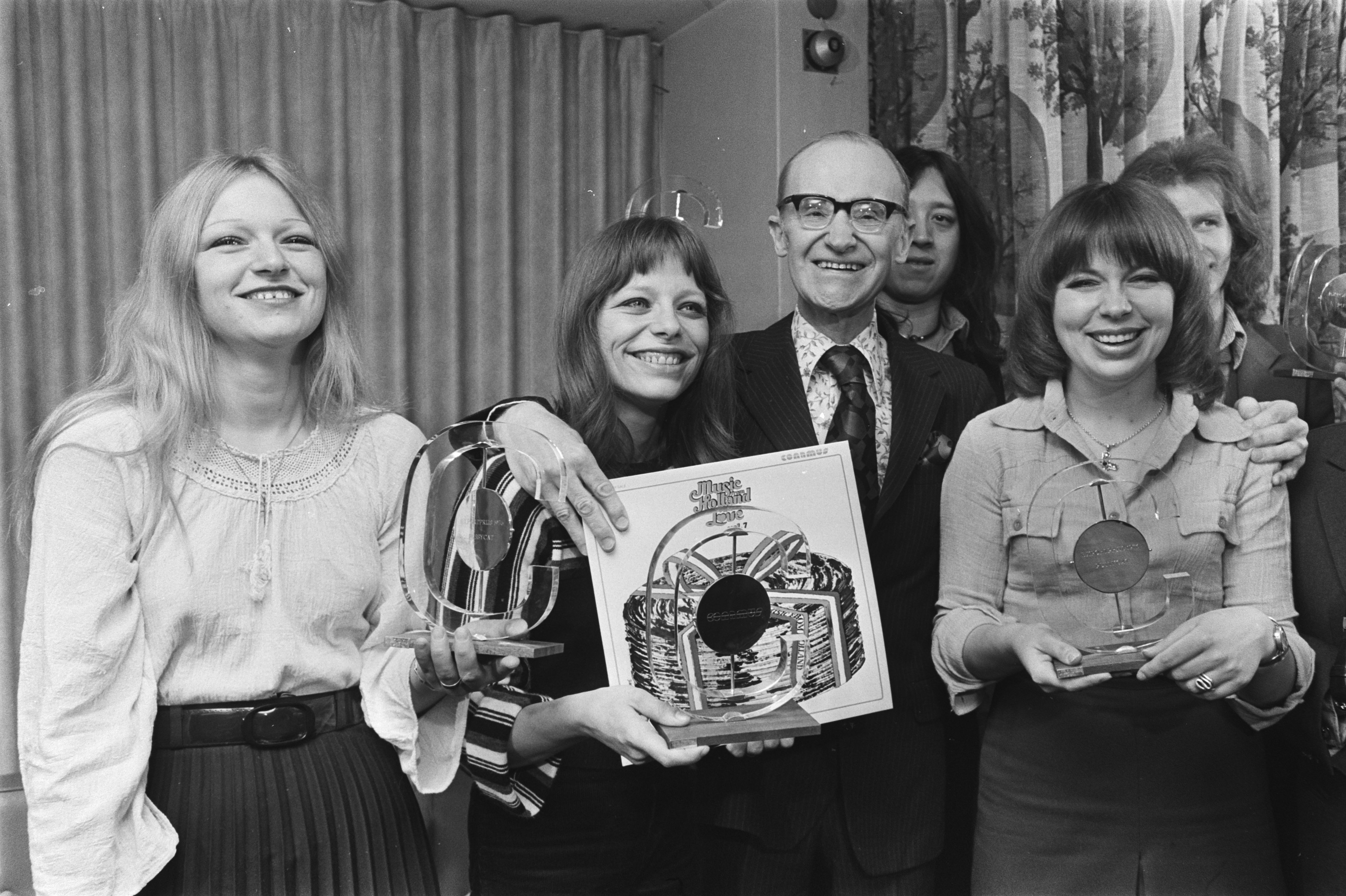
Pussycat receiving the Conamus Award from British Ambassador in 1977

Werner's panache in composing music and the band's own brilliant style of execution led the group 'Pussycat' to win several prestigious awards including the 'Conamus Award' (now called the Buma Export Award), 'Edison Award' and the German 'Löwe von Radio Luxemburg'. Pussycat won Conamus Export Award on 5 January 1977 from the Conamus Foundation. This award was bestowed upon them by the British Ambassador to the Netherlands, Sir John Barnes in The Hague for being the first Dutch pop group that had primarily taken on the British charts with their debut song 'Mississippi'.

Werner wrote several other hit songs for Pussycat albums. Some of them include "Same Old Song", "Teenage Queenie" and "Then The Music Stopped". Towards the end of 1984 the third line up of 'Pussycat' had disbanded and Werner with a repertoire of songs to his credit moved on to write songs for other artists.

== Death ==
Werner Theunissen continued to write songs until his death due to a cardiac arrest in a restaurant in England on 18 January 2010. The last song he wrote for Toni Willé the former lead vocalist of Pussycat was 'Impressions'. In 2012 she dedicated this song to him.

== The Entertainers – Discography ==
- 1965 Searching / Down Home Girl (Public-Records PR 651)
- 1965 Searching / Down Home Girl (CNR UH 9778)
- 1965 Searching / Down Home girl (Columbia C 23118) Duitsland
- 1966 It's You / I'm Sorry Girl (CNR UH 9798)
- 1966 Crazy Miss Daisy / Little Girl (CNR UH 9803)

== Charts ==
=== Dutch Charts: Werner Theunissen (Pussycat) Singles ===
Title	Entry	Peaks	Weeks
Mississippi	22 November 1975	1	11
Georgie	21 February 1976	1	8
Smile	28 August 1976	2	9
My Broken Souvenirs	2 April 1977	2	8
I'll Be Your Woman	3 September 1977	12	4
If You Ever Come To Amsterdam	31 December 1977	21	3
Wet Day in September	5 August 1978	8	10
Hey Joe	6 January 1979	17	7
Daddy	8 September 1979	13	7
Let Freedom Range	8 December 1979	38	5
Doin' La Bamba	2 August 1980	4	8
Then The Music Stopped	25 April 1981	10	11
Une chambre pour la nuit	1 August 1981	16	7
Teenage Queenie	14 November 1981	33	5
De zomerzon (Koos Alberts & Yvon)	17 August 1996	25	5

=== UK Charts : The Best Rated Songs from Werner Theunissen (Pussycat) ===
Title	Reviews	Average
Abschiedssouvenir	10	5
Mississippi	140	4.74
Help Me Living On	11	4.73
Mississippi [deutsch]	26	4.65
The Easy Way	5	4.6
Ein altes Lied	9	4.56
Georgie [deutsch]	11	4.55
Wet Day in September	22	4.45
Teenage Queenie	45	4.44
Let Freedom Range	9	4.44
Georgie	79	4.41
I'll Be Your Woman	21	4.29
Mexicali Lane	7	4.29
If You Ever Come To Amsterdam	25	4.24
My Broken Souvenirs	56	4.23
Smile	54	4.22
Then The Music Stopped	19	4.21
Bad Boy	6	4.17
Light of a Gipsy	8	4.12
Une chambre pour la nuit	12	4

=== UK Charts: The Most Known Songs from Werner Theunissen ===
Title	Reviews	Average
Mississippi	140	4.74
Georgie	79	4.41
My Broken Souvenirs	56	4.23
Smile	54	4.22
Teenage Queenie	45	4.44
Mississippi [deutsch]	26	4.65
If You Ever Come To Amsterdam	25	4.24
Wet Day in September	22	4.45
I'll Be Your Woman	21	4.29
Then The Music Stopped	19	4.21
Doin' La Bamba	16	3.94
Hey Joe	15	3.2
Une chambre pour la nuit	12	4
Help Me Living On	11	4.73
Georgie [deutsch]	11	4.55
Daddy	11	3.82
Abschiedssouvenir	10	5
Ein altes Lied	9	4.56
Let Freedom Range	9	4.44
Ich bleib bei dir (Rebekka)	9	3.22
