= Mississippi (Pussycat song) =

1975 single by Pussycat

- One of the Dutch artwork variants

Single by Pussycat

from the album First of All
- B-side: "Do It"
- Released: April 1975
- Length: 4:33
- Label: EMI
- Songwriter(s): Werner Theunissen
- Producer(s): Eddy Hilberts

Pussycat singles chronology
"Mississippi" (1975)	"Georgie" (1976)

"Mississippi" is a song by Dutch country pop band Pussycat. Written by Werner Theunissen and produced by Eddy Hilberts, "Mississippi" was the group's first number-one single in their home country, as well as their only number-one single in most countries worldwide. In New Zealand and South Africa, "Mississippi" was their first of two number-one singles; it was the best-selling single of 1977 in the latter nation.

== History ==
Werner Theunissen wrote "Mississippi" in 1969 after being inspired by the Bee Gees song "Massachusetts". The song grabbed EMI Bovema's attention, and they decided to sign the band. By December 1975, the song had topped the Dutch Singles Chart. Its international success came in 1976, when it reached number one in Belgium, Germany, Ireland, New Zealand, Norway, South Africa, Switzerland and the United Kingdom, as well as number two in Australia, number four in Austria, and number six in Sweden. In South Africa, "Mississippi" was the highest-selling single of 1977. It is estimated to have sold five million copies worldwide. Outside the Netherlands, Pussycat would later achieve more number-one singles in New Zealand and South Africa, but in most territories, "Mississippi" was their highest-charting effort.

In the UK, the song was promoted by John Saunders Hughes through a Liverpool radio station. The lyrics are about the history of music, and how rock music became more popular than country music.

== Charts ==
=== Weekly charts ===
Chart (1975–1977)	Peak position
Australia (Kent Music Report)	2
Austria (Ö3 Austria Top 40)	4
Belgium (Ultratop 50 Flanders)	1
Brazil (Pro-Música Brasil)	4
Denmark (Denmark Radio)	9
Ireland (IRMA)	1
Israel (Israel Broadcasting Service)	3
Netherlands (Dutch Top 40)	1
Netherlands (Single Top 100)	1
New Zealand (Recorded Music NZ)	1
Norway (VG-lista)	1
South Africa (Springbok Radio)	1
Sweden (Sverigetopplistan)	6
Switzerland (Schweizer Hitparade)	1
UK Singles (OCC)	1
West Germany (GfK)	1

=== Year-end charts ===
Chart (1975)	Position
Netherlands (Single Top 100)	77

Chart (1976)	Position
Australia (Kent Music Report)	13
Austria (Ö3 Austria Top 40)	18
Belgium (Ultratop)	3
Netherlands (Single Top 100)	56
New Zealand (RIANZ)	3
Switzerland (Schweizer Hitparade)	5
UK Singles (OCC)	3
West Germany (Media Control)	2

Chart (1977)	Position
South Africa (Springbok Radio)	1

== Sales and certifications ==
Region	Certification	Certified units/sales
Germany (BVMI)	Gold	500,000^{^}
United Kingdom (BPI)	Gold	500,000^{^}
^{^} Shipments figures based on certification alone.

== Covers ==
Swedish dansband Vikingarna covered the song in Swedish, with lyrics by Margot Borgström, in April 1976, less than six months after the original release. The Swedish song title was also "Mississippi", and it appeared on the band's album Kramgoa Låtar 3 the same year.
