= Pussycat (band) =

Dutch country and pop music group

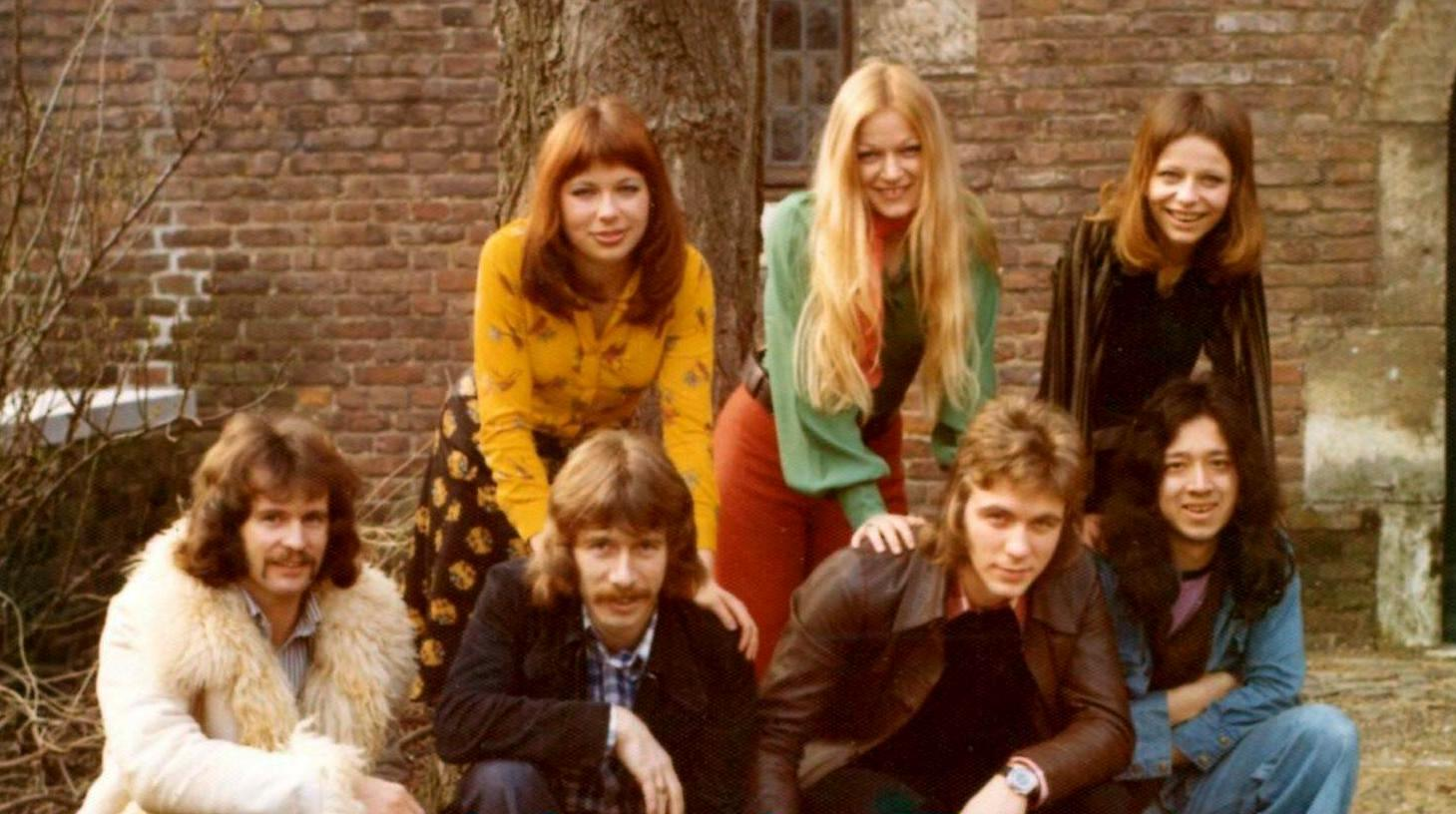
- Pussycat band in 1975, with Marianne, Toni and Betty on the top row from left

Background information
- Origin: Brunssum, Netherlands
- Genres: Pop; country; rock
- Years active: 1975–1985, 2004–2005
- Labels: Telstar, Parlophone, Capitol, Bovema, EMI-Odeon, Odeon, Swan, Columbia Records (AUS)
- Website: pussycatonline.nl

Pussycat was a Dutch country and pop group led by the three Veldpaus sisters: Toni (born 1953), Betty (1952–2024), and Marianne (born 1951). Other members of the band were guitarists Lou Willé (Toni's then-husband), Theo Wetzels, Theo Coumans, and John Theunissen. Their song "Mississippi" was a number one hit in most European countries, including the UK, in 1975/6.

== Career ==
Prior to forming the band, the three sisters were telephone operators in Limburg, whilst Theunissen, Wetzels, and Coumans were in a group called Scum. Lou Willé played in a group called Ricky Rendall and His Centurions until he married Toni, and created the group Sweet Reaction that eventually became known as Pussycat.

In 1975 they scored a big European hit with the song "Mississippi". However they had to wait a further year for the single to make the British charts when it climbed to number one in the UK Singles Chart in October 1976. Penned by Werner Theunissen, who had been the sisters' guitar teacher, it is estimated that "Mississippi" sold over five million copies worldwide. It was followed by "Smile" in 1976, and "Hey Joe" in 1978. Other hits were "If You Ever Come to Amsterdam", "Georgie", "Wet Day in September" and "My Broken Souvenirs". Their career in Europe spanned more than a decade and included some seventeen albums. By 1978 Hans Lutjens had replaced Coumans on drums, as the band continued to release albums and tour, travelling as far afield as South Africa. They made regular appearances on the West German TV series, Musikladen, in the late 1970s and early 1980s.

In the following years, the sisters did perform again, however, this time under the name Anycat. In 1999 they decided to make a comeback under their old name Pussycat. It was the same year in which Doe Maar also got back together for a short time, unrelated. Initially, the only intention was to perform, although for a while there were thoughts of releasing new material to be written by Werner Theunissen. However, new records were not released. They still performed as Pussycat through 2001.

In 2001, 25 years after the success with "Mississippi", the compilation album 25 Years After Mississippi was released and reached the charts. It was listed in the Album Top 100 for seven weeks. This year saw several more reunion performances. In 2004, they released the box set, The Complete Collection, which consisted of three CDs and a DVD.

In 2005, they recorded the single "Somewhere Someone" with the Dutch country band Major Dundee, which was also included on Major Dundee's album, Young Gods. In 2007, they gave their background vocals to the Dutch language reggae cover of "Mississippi" by Dennis Jones. In June 2023, there was an album released with previous unreleased song demos of the band from the year 1983, with the title Unreleased Demos 1983.

On 28 June 2024, Betty Veldpaus died at the age of 72.

== Members ==
- Toni Veldpaus (married Willé) – lead vocals (1975–1985)
- Betty Veldpaus (married Dragstra) – singer (1975–1985; died 2024)
- Marianne Veldpaus (married Hensen) – singer (1975–1985)
- Lou "Loulou" Willé (Toni's then husband) – guitar (1975–1985)
- John Theunissen – guitar (1975–1980)
- Ferd Berger – guitar (1981–1982)
- Kees Buenen – keyboards (1981–1982)
- Theo Wetzels – bass guitar (1975–1980)
- Theo Coumans – drums (1975–1978)
- Hans Lutjens – drums (1978–1980)
- Frans Meijer – drums (1981–1982)

== Discography ==
=== Albums ===
Year	Title	Details	Peak chart positions						
Year	Title	Details	NDL	AUS	BEL	GER	NOR	SWE	NZ
1976	First of All	Label: EMI-Bovema Holland; Catalogue: 5C 064-25 419	4	29	—	10	2	26	16
1977	Souvenirs	Label: EMI; Catalogue: 5C 064-25565	6	71	28	—	9	—	1
1978	Wet Day in September	Label: Bovema Negram; Catalogue: 5N 062-25989	16	—	—	—	15	—	—
1979	Simply to be with You	Label: Bovema Negram; Catalogue: 1A 062-26364	—	—	—	—	38	—	—
1979	The Best of Pussycat	Label: Bovema Negram; Catalogue: 5N 050-26201	—	—	—	—	—	—	—
1981	Blue Lights	Label: EMI; Catalogue: 1A 062-26656	10	—	—	—	—	—	—
1983	After All	Label: EMI; Catalogue: 1A068-26929	—	—	—	—	—	—	—
1994	The Collection & More	Label: Arcade; Catalogue: 9902217	60	—	—	—	—	—	—
2001	25 jaar na Mississippi	Label: EMI; Catalogue: 7243 531822 2 9	26	—	—	—	—	—	—
"—" denotes a recording that did not chart or was not released in that territory.

=== Singles ===
Year	Title	Peak chart positions											Album
Year	Title	NDL	AUS	BEL	GER	AUT	SWI	NOR	SWE	UK	NZ	SA	Album
1975	"Mississippi" / "Do It"	1	2	1	1	4	1	1	6	1	1	1	First of All
1975	"Mississippi" (German version) / "Lieb Mich"	—	—	—	24	—	—	—	—	—	—	—	Non-album single
1976	"Georgie" / "Take Me"	1	74	2	6	2	2	—	—	—	14	2	First of All
1976	"Smile" / "What Did They Do to the People"	2	34	3	9	10	8	—	—	24	3	1	First of All
1977	"Ein Altes Lied" / "Pasadena" (German)	—	—	—	41	—	—	—	—	—	—	—	Non-album single
1977	"My Broken Souvenirs" / "Nothing to Hide"	2	95	2	22	12	7	—	—	—	1	2	Souvenirs
1977	"I'll Be Your Woman" / "Just a Woman"	12	—	21	—	—	—	—	—	—	—	—	Souvenirs
1977	"If You Ever Come to Amsterdam" / "You Must Have Been a Beautiful Baby"	21	—	—	—	—	—	—	—	—	—	10	Wet Day in September
1978	"Same Old Song" / "Stupid Cupid"	8	76	10	—	—	—	—	—	—	—	—	Wet Day in September
1978	"Wet Day in September" / "I Remember Springtime"	17	—	18	—	—	—	—	—	—	—	—	Wet Day in September
1979	"Hey Joe" / "Love in September"	17	—	26	—	—	—	—	—	—	—	—	Wet Day in September
1979	"Daddy" / "Three Steps and Then ..."	13	—	19	—	—	—	—	—	—	—	—	Simply to Be with You
1979	"Let Freedom Range" / "Don't Love Him"	38	—	29	—	—	—	—	—	—	—	—	Simply to Be with You
1980	"Doin' la Bamba" / "On the Corner of My Life"	4	—	15	—	—	—	—	—	—	—	—	Simply to Be with You
1981	"Then the Music Stopped" / "Cha Cha Me Baby"	10	—	18	—	—	—	—	—	—	—	—	Blue Lights
1981	"Une Chambre Pour La Nuit" / "I Don't Wanna Rock and Roll"	16	—	—	—	—	—	—	—	—	—	—	Blue Lights
1981	"Teenage Queenie" / "Who's Gonna Love You"	33	—	—	47	—	—	—	—	—	—	—	Blue Lights
1983	"Lovers of a Kind" / "Closer to You"	22	—	26	—	—	—	—	—	—	—	—	After All
"—" denotes a recording that did not chart or was not released in that territory.

== See also ==
- List of performers on Top of the Pops
- List of artists who reached number one on the UK Singles Chart
- List of country music performers
- List of bands from the Netherlands
