= List of Dutch Top 40 number-one singles of 1976 =

These hits topped the Dutch Top 40 in 1976.

Issue Date	Song	Artist(s)	Reference
3 January	"Mississippi"	Pussycat	
10 January	"Bohemian Rhapsody"	Queen	
17 January	"Bohemian Rhapsody"	Queen	
24 January	"Bohemian Rhapsody"	Queen	
31 January	"Willempie"	André van Duin	
7 February	"Willempie"	André van Duin	
14 February	"Willempie"	André van Duin	
21 February	"Love Hurts"	Nazareth	
28 February	"Love Hurts"	Nazareth	
6 March	"Love Hurts"	Nazareth	
13 March	"Love Hurts"	Nazareth	
20 March	"Love Hurts"	Nazareth	
27 March	"The Alternative Way"	Anita Meyer	
3 April	"Fernando"	ABBA	
10 April	"Fernando"	ABBA	
17 April	"Fernando"	ABBA	
24 April	"Save Your Kisses for Me"	Brotherhood of Man	
1 May	"Save Your Kisses for Me"	Brotherhood of Man	
8 May	"Baretta's Theme"	Sammy Davis Jr.	
15 May	"Baretta's Theme"	Sammy Davis Jr.	
22 May	"Baretta's Theme"	Sammy Davis Jr.	
29 May	"Sweet Love"	Ferrari	
5 June	"This Melody"	Julien Clerc	
12 June	"Rocky"	Don Mercedes	
19 June	"Rocky"	Don Mercedes	
26 June	"Jungle Rock"	Hank Mizell	
3 July	"Arms of Mary"	Sutherland Brothers and Quiver	
10 July	"Arms of Mary"	Sutherland Brothers and Quiver	
17 July	"Arms of Mary"	Sutherland Brothers and Quiver	
24 July	"Show Me the Way" (Live version)	Peter Frampton	
31 July	"Nice and Slow"	Jesse Green	
7 August	"Nice and Slow"	Jesse Green	
14 August	"Kiss and Say Goodbye"	The Manhattans	
21 August	"Kiss and Say Goodbye"	The Manhattans	
28 August	"Kiss and Say Goodbye"	The Manhattans	
4 September	"Dancing Queen"	ABBA	
11 September	"Dancing Queen"	ABBA	
18 September	"Dancing Queen"	ABBA	
25 September	"Dancing Queen"	ABBA	
2 October	"Dancing Queen"	ABBA	
9 October	"Mon Amour"	BZN	
16 October	"Mon Amour"	BZN	
23 October	"Mon Amour"	BZN	
30 October	"Mon Amour"	BZN	
6 November	"Mon Amour"	BZN	
13 November	"Heaven Must Be Missing an Angel"	Tavares	
20 November	"Heaven Must Be Missing an Angel"	Tavares	
27 November	"Money, Money, Money"	ABBA	
4 December	"Money, Money, Money"	ABBA	
11 December	"If You Leave Me Now"	Chicago	
18 December	"If You Leave Me Now"	Chicago	
25 December	"If You Leave Me Now"	Chicago	

== See also ==
- 1976 in music
