= List of Radio & Records number-one singles =

This is a list of songs in the music industry that have peaked at number-one on the Radio & Records singles chart. It was created in 1973, and monitored the most popular singles in terms of popular radio play that were based on and/or compiled from a panel consisting of Top 40/CHR stations in the United States (and Canada during the Radio & Records years from 1973 to 1994) that served as reporters.

Following the August 4, 2006 issue, Radio & Records was absorbed by competitor Billboard (and relaunched as R&R with the August 11, 2006 issue using the Nielsen BDS charts). After that date, the number-one singles come from Mediabase, which supplied Radio & Records with its chart data.

== Radio & Records number-one singles ==
=== 1970s ===
- List of Radio & Records number-one singles of the 1970s

=== 1980s ===
- List of Radio & Records number-one singles of the 1980s

=== 1990s ===
- List of Radio & Records number-one singles of the 1990s

=== 2000s ===
- List of Radio & Records and Mediabase number-one singles of the 2000s

== Mediabase number-one singles ==
=== 2000s ===
- List of Radio & Records and Mediabase number-one singles of the 2000s

=== 2010s ===
- List of Mediabase number-one singles of the 2010s

=== 2020s ===
- List of Mediabase number-one singles of the 2020s

== See also ==
- List of Billboard number-one singles
- List of record charts
