= Love Talk (album) =

Studio album by the Manhattans
- Released: 1979
- Studio: Mediasound, New York City, New York; Sigma Sound, Philadelphia, Pennsylvania
- Genre: Soul, R&B
- Label: Columbia
- Producer: Bert deCoteaux, the Manhattans, Scorpicorn Music, Inc., Jack Faith

The Manhattans chronology
There's No Good in Goodbye (1978)	Love Talk (1979)	After Midnight (1980)

Love Talk is the tenth studio album by American vocal group the Manhattans, released in 1979 through Columbia Records.

== Reception ==
Professional ratings
Review scores
Source	Rating
AllMusic	4/5 stars
The Virgin Encyclopedia of R&B and Soul	3/5 stars

The album peaked at No. 20 on the R&B albums chart. It also reached No. 141 on the Billboard 200. The album features the singles "Here Comes the Hurt Again", which peaked at No. 29 on the Hot Soul Singles chart, and "The Way We Were" / "Memories", which reached No. 33 on the same chart.

The Bay State Banner wrote that "these kings of the somber narrative, this selection of songs and lead vocals are worthy of being included in any all-time listing of vocal groups works."

== Track listing ==
Side one
No.	Title	Writer(s)	Length
1.	"After You"	Doug Frank, Doug James	3:58
2.	"Love Talk"	Winfred Lovett	4:33
3.	"The Right Feeling at the Wrong Time"	Barbara Wyrick, Keith Lamb	3:45
4.	"Devil in the Dark"	Allan Felder, T.G. Conway, Cary Gilbert	4:06
5.	"Here Comes the Hurt Again"	Frank Johnson	4:56

Side two
No.	Title	Writer(s)	Length
1.	"I Just Wanna Be the One in Your Life"	Michael Price, Daniel Walsh	3:41
2.	"New York City"	Winfred Lovett	4:29
3.	"That's Not Part of the Show"	Edward Bivins	4:27
4.	"The Way We Were" / "Memories" (Medley)	Marvin Hamlisch, Alan Bergman, Marilyn Bergman / Gus Kahn, Egbert Van Alstyne	5:13
5.	"We Tried"	Winfred Lovett	3:38

== Charts ==
Album

Chart (1979)	Peaks
U.S. Billboard Top LPs	141
U.S. Billboard Top Soul LPs	20

Singles

Year	Single	Peaks
Year	Single	US R&B
1979	"Here Comes the Hurt Again"	29
1979	"The Way We Were" / "Memories" (medley)	33
