= There's No Good in Goodbye =

Studio album by the Manhattans
- Released: 1978
- Studios: Total Experience (Hollywood, California)
- Genres: Soul, R&B
- Label: Columbia
- Producers: Bobby Martin, the Manhattans

The Manhattans chronology
It Feels So Good (1977)	There's No Good in Goodbye (1978)	Love Talk (1979)

There's No Good in Goodbye is a studio album by American vocal group the Manhattans, released in 1978 through Columbia Records.

== Reception ==
Professional ratings
Review scores
Source	Rating
AllMusic	3/5 stars
The Virgin Encyclopedia of R&B and Soul	4/5 stars

The album peaked at No. 18 on the R&B albums chart. It also reached No. 78 on the Billboard 200. The album features the singles "Am I Losing You", which peaked at No. 6 on the Hot Soul Singles chart, and "Everybody Has a Dream", which reached No. 65 on the same chart.

The Globe and Mail wrote that "the Manhattans are the dying man's O'Jays, content to copy the form of gospel rhythm and blues without offering a fraction of the content."

== Track listing ==
Side one
No.	Title	Writer(s)	Length
1.	"There's No Good in Goodbye"	Teddy Randazzo, Roger Joyce	3:46
2.	"Then You Can Tell Me Goodbye"	John D. Loudermilk	4:20
3.	"Tomorrow"	Martin Charnin, Charles Strouse	4:00
4.	"Share My Life"	Glenn Crockwell, Lloyd Donnelly	4:02
5.	"Am I Losing You"	Alvin Fields, Barbara Morr, Doug Stender	3:48

Side two
No.	Title	Writer(s)	Length
1.	"Happiness"	Winfred Lovett	3:33
2.	"You're My Life"	Teddy Randazzo, Victoria Pike, Roger Joyce	4:10
3.	"Goodbye Is the Saddest Word"	Bob Riley	3:42
4.	"Movin'"	Winfred Lovett	3:52
5.	"Everybody Has a Dream"	Billy Joel	7:05

== Charts ==
Album

Chart (1978)	Peaks
U.S. Billboard Top LPs	78
U.S. Billboard Top Soul LPs	18

Singles

Year	Single	Peaks	
Year	Single	US	US R&B
1978	"Am I Losing You"	101	6
1978	"Everybody Has a Dream"	—	65
