= The Manhattans (album) =

Studio album by the Manhattans
- Released: 1976
- Studio: Sigma Sound, Philadelphia; Columbia 30th Street, New York City
- Genre: Soul, R&B
- Length: 34:24
- Label: Columbia
- Producer: Manhattans Productions, Inc., Bobby Martin, Bert deCoteaux

The Manhattans chronology
That's How Much I Love You (1974)	The Manhattans (1976)	It Feels So Good (1977)

Professional ratings
Review scores
Source	Rating
AllMusic	4/5 stars

The Manhattans is the seventh studio album by American vocal group the Manhattans, released in 1976 through Columbia Records. This album has been Certified Gold by the R.I.A.A.

== Reception ==
The album peaked at No. 6 on the R&B albums chart. It also reached No. 16 on the Billboard 200. The album features the singles "Kiss and Say Goodbye", which peaked at No. 1 on the Hot Soul Singles chart and the Billboard Hot 100, and "Hurt", which reached No. 10 on the Hot Soul Singles chart and No. 97 on the Billboard Hot 100.

== Track listing ==
Side one
No.	Title	Writer(s)	Length
1.	"Searching for Love"	Mikki Farrow, Bruce Gray, Allan Felder	4:38
2.	"We'll Have Forever to Love"	Edward Bivins	3:09
3.	"Take It or Leave It"	Ben Weisman, Evie Sands, Richard Germinaro	3:17
4.	"Reasons"	Maurice White, Charles Stepney, Philip Bailey	3:29
5.	"How Can Anything So Good Be So Bad for You?"	Winfred Lovett	3:10

Side two
No.	Title	Writer(s)	Length
1.	"Hurt"	Al Jacobs, Jimmie Crane	3:03
2.	"Wonderful World of Love"	Robert Riley Sr.	2:47
3.	"If You're Ever Gonna Love Me"	Frank Johnson	3:08
4.	"La La La Wish Upon a Star"	Teddy Randazzo, Victoria Pike, Roger Joyce	3:27
5.	"Kiss and Say Goodbye"	Winfred Lovett	4:28

== Charts ==
Album

Chart (1976)	Peaks
U.S. Billboard Top LPs	16
U.S. Billboard Top Soul LPs	6
Australia (Kent Music Report)	39

Singles

Year	Single	Peaks		
Year	Single	US	US R&B	US A/C
1975	"Hurt"	97	10	—
1976	"Kiss and Say Goodbye"	1	1	12
