= List of Radio & Records number-one singles of the 1970s =

This is a list of songs that have peaked at number-one on the Radio & Records singles chart in the 1970s.

== 1973 ==
Issue Date	Song	Artist(s)	Reference
October 5	"Half-Breed"	Cher	
October 12	"Angie"	The Rolling Stones	
October 19	"Angie"	The Rolling Stones	
October 26	"Angie"	The Rolling Stones	
November 2	"Angie"	The Rolling Stones	
November 9	"Photograph"	Ringo Starr	
November 16	"Photograph"	Ringo Starr	
November 23	"Photograph"	Ringo Starr	
November 30	"Goodbye Yellow Brick Road"	Elton John	
December 7	"Goodbye Yellow Brick Road"	Elton John	
December 14	"Goodbye Yellow Brick Road"	Elton John	
December 21	"Time in a Bottle"	Jim Croce	

== 1974 ==
Issue Date	Song	Artist(s)	Reference
January 11	"Time in a Bottle"	Jim Croce	
January 18	"The Way We Were"	Barbra Streisand	
January 25	"The Way We Were"	Barbra Streisand	
February 1	"The Way We Were"	Barbra Streisand	
February 8	"Seasons in the Sun"	Terry Jacks	
February 15	"Seasons in the Sun"	Terry Jacks	
February 22	"Seasons in the Sun"	Terry Jacks	
March 1	"Seasons in the Sun"	Terry Jacks	
March 8	"Seasons in the Sun"	Terry Jacks	
March 15	"Seasons in the Sun"	Terry Jacks	
March 22	"Bennie and the Jets"	Elton John	
March 29	"Bennie and the Jets"	Elton John	
April 5	"Hooked on a Feeling"	Blue Swede	
April 12	"Bennie and the Jets"	Elton John	
April 19	"The Loco-Motion"	Grand Funk Railroad	
April 26	"The Loco-Motion"	Grand Funk Railroad	
May 3	"The Loco-Motion"	Grand Funk Railroad	
May 10	"The Loco-Motion"	Grand Funk Railroad	
May 17	"The Streak"	Ray Stevens	
May 24	"Band on the Run"	Paul McCartney & Wings	
May 31	"Band on the Run"	Paul McCartney & Wings	
June 7	"Sundown"	Gordon Lightfoot	
June 14	"Sundown"	Gordon Lightfoot	
June 21	"Sundown"	Gordon Lightfoot	
June 28	"Rock the Boat"	The Hues Corporation	
July 5	"Rock the Boat"	The Hues Corporation	
July 12	"Rock the Boat"	The Hues Corporation	
July 19	"Rock the Boat"	The Hues Corporation	
July 26	"Rock Your Baby"	George McCrae	
August 2	"The Night Chicago Died"	Paper Lace	
August 9	"The Night Chicago Died"	Paper Lace	
August 16	"The Night Chicago Died"	Paper Lace	
August 23	"(You're) Having My Baby"	Paul Anka	
August 30	"(You're) Having My Baby"	Paul Anka	
September 6	"I Shot the Sheriff"	Eric Clapton	
September 13	"I Honestly Love You"	Olivia Newton-John	
September 20	"I Honestly Love You"	Olivia Newton-John	
September 27	"I Honestly Love You"	Olivia Newton-John	
October 4	"I Honestly Love You"	Olivia Newton-John	
October 11	"I Honestly Love You"	Olivia Newton-John	
October 18	"I Honestly Love You"	Olivia Newton-John	
October 25	"You Ain't Seen Nothin' Yet"	Bachman–Turner Overdrive	
November 1	"You Ain't Seen Nothin' Yet"	Bachman–Turner Overdrive	
November 8	"You Ain't Seen Nothin' Yet"	Bachman–Turner Overdrive	
November 15	"I Can Help"	Billy Swan	
November 22	"Kung Fu Fighting"	Carl Douglas	
November 29	"Kung Fu Fighting"	Carl Douglas	
December 6	"Kung Fu Fighting"	Carl Douglas	
December 13	"Kung Fu Fighting"	Carl Douglas	
December 20	"Lucy in the Sky with Diamonds"	Elton John	

== 1975 ==
Issue Date	Song	Artist(s)	Reference
January 10	"Mandy"	Barry Manilow	
January 17	"Mandy"	Barry Manilow	
January 24	"Mandy"	Barry Manilow	
January 31	"Mandy"	Barry Manilow	
February 7	"Black Water"	The Doobie Brothers	
February 14	"Black Water"	The Doobie Brothers	
February 21	"Have You Never Been Mellow"	Olivia Newton-John	
February 28	"Have You Never Been Mellow"	Olivia Newton-John	
March 7	"Have You Never Been Mellow"	Olivia Newton-John	
March 14	"Have You Never Been Mellow"	Olivia Newton-John	
March 21	"Have You Never Been Mellow"	Olivia Newton-John	
March 28	"Lovin' You"	Minnie Riperton	
April 4	"Philadelphia Freedom"	The Elton John Band	
April 11	"Philadelphia Freedom"	The Elton John Band	
April 18	"Philadelphia Freedom"	The Elton John Band	
April 25	"Philadelphia Freedom"	The Elton John Band	
May 2	"Philadelphia Freedom"	The Elton John Band	
May 9	"He Don't Love You (Like I Love You)"	Tony Orlando and Dawn	
May 16	"Philadelphia Freedom"	The Elton John Band	
May 23	"Sister Golden Hair"	America	
May 30	"Sister Golden Hair"	America	
June 6	"Love Will Keep Us Together"	Captain & Tennille	
June 13	"Love Will Keep Us Together"	Captain & Tennille	
June 20	"Love Will Keep Us Together"	Captain & Tennille	
June 27	"Love Will Keep Us Together"	Captain & Tennille	
July 4	"Love Will Keep Us Together"	Captain & Tennille	
July 11	"Love Will Keep Us Together"	Captain & Tennille	
July 18	"The Hustle"	Van McCoy	
July 25	"Jive Talkin'"	Bee Gees	
August 1	"Jive Talkin'"	Bee Gees	
August 8	"Jive Talkin'"	Bee Gees	
August 15	"Jive Talkin'"	Bee Gees	
August 22	"Jive Talkin'"	Bee Gees	
August 29	"Fallin' in Love"	Hamilton, Joe Frank & Reynolds	
September 5	"Get Down Tonight"	KC and the Sunshine Band	
September 12	"Get Down Tonight"	KC and the Sunshine Band	
September 19	"Fame"	David Bowie	
September 26	"Fame"	David Bowie	
October 3	"I'm Sorry"	John Denver	
October 10	"Bad Blood"	Neil Sedaka	
October 17	"Bad Blood"	Neil Sedaka	
October 24	"Bad Blood"	Neil Sedaka	
October 31	"Island Girl"	Elton John	
November 7	"Island Girl"	Elton John	
November 14	"Island Girl"	Elton John	
November 21	"That's the Way (I Like It)"	KC and the Sunshine Band	
November 28	"That's the Way (I Like It)"	KC and the Sunshine Band	
December 5	"That's the Way (I Like It)"	KC and the Sunshine Band	
December 12	"That's the Way (I Like It)"	KC and the Sunshine Band	
December 19	"I Write the Songs"	Barry Manilow	

== 1976 ==
Issue Date	Song	Artist(s)	Reference
January 9	"I Write the Songs"	Barry Manilow	
January 16	"I Write the Songs"	Barry Manilow	
January 23	"50 Ways to Leave Your Lover"	Paul Simon	
January 30	"50 Ways to Leave Your Lover"	Paul Simon	
February 6	"50 Ways to Leave Your Lover"	Paul Simon	
February 13	"50 Ways to Leave Your Lover"	Paul Simon	
February 20	"Theme from S.W.A.T."	Rhythm Heritage	
February 27	"Theme from S.W.A.T."	Rhythm Heritage	
March 5	"Dream Weaver"	Gary Wright	
March 12	"Dream Weaver"	Gary Wright	
March 19	"December, 1963 (Oh, What a Night)"	The Four Seasons	
March 26	"December, 1963 (Oh, What a Night)"	The Four Seasons	
April 2	"December, 1963 (Oh, What a Night)"	The Four Seasons	
April 9	"Disco Lady"	Johnnie Taylor	
April 16	"Disco Lady"	Johnnie Taylor	
April 23	"Welcome Back"	John Sebastian	
April 30	"Welcome Back"	John Sebastian	
May 7	"Welcome Back"	John Sebastian	
May 14	"Silly Love Songs"	Wings	
May 21	"Silly Love Songs"	Wings	
May 28	"Silly Love Songs"	Wings	
June 4	"Silly Love Songs"	Wings	
June 11	"Silly Love Songs"	Wings	
June 18	"Silly Love Songs"	Wings	
June 25	"Afternoon Delight"	Starland Vocal Band	
July 2	"Afternoon Delight"	Starland Vocal Band	
July 9	"Afternoon Delight"	Starland Vocal Band	
July 16	"Afternoon Delight"	Starland Vocal Band	
July 23	"Kiss and Say Goodbye"	The Manhattans	
July 30	"Don't Go Breaking My Heart"	Elton John & Kiki Dee	
August 6	"Don't Go Breaking My Heart"	Elton John & Kiki Dee	
August 13	"Don't Go Breaking My Heart"	Elton John & Kiki Dee	
August 20	"Don't Go Breaking My Heart"	Elton John & Kiki Dee	
August 27	"Don't Go Breaking My Heart"	Elton John & Kiki Dee	
September 3	"Don't Go Breaking My Heart"	Elton John & Kiki Dee	
September 10	"Don't Go Breaking My Heart"	Elton John & Kiki Dee	
September 17	"(Shake, Shake, Shake) Shake Your Booty"	KC and the Sunshine Band	
September 24	"If You Leave Me Now"	Chicago	
October 1	"If You Leave Me Now"	Chicago	
October 8	"If You Leave Me Now"	Chicago	
October 15	"Rock'n Me"	Steve Miller Band	
October 22	"Rock'n Me"	Steve Miller Band	
October 29	"Rock'n Me"	Steve Miller Band	
November 5	"Muskrat Love"	Captain & Tennille	
November 12	"Tonight's the Night (Gonna Be Alright)"	Rod Stewart	
November 19	"Tonight's the Night (Gonna Be Alright)"	Rod Stewart	
November 26	"Tonight's the Night (Gonna Be Alright)"	Rod Stewart	
December 3	"Tonight's the Night (Gonna Be Alright)"	Rod Stewart	
December 10	"Tonight's the Night (Gonna Be Alright)"	Rod Stewart	
December 17	"You Make Me Feel Like Dancing"	Leo Sayer	

== 1977 ==
Issue Date	Song	Artist(s)	Reference
January 7	"You Make Me Feel Like Dancing"	Leo Sayer	
January 14	"Blinded by the Light"	Manfred Mann's Earth Band	
January 21	"Blinded by the Light"	Manfred Mann's Earth Band	
January 28	"Blinded by the Light"	Manfred Mann's Earth Band	
February 4	"New Kid in Town"	Eagles	
February 11	"New Kid in Town"	Eagles	
February 18	"Torn Between Two Lovers"	Mary MacGregor	
February 25	"Evergreen (Love Theme from A Star Is Born)"	Barbra Streisand	
March 4	"Evergreen (Love Theme from A Star Is Born)"	Barbra Streisand	
March 11	"Evergreen (Love Theme from A Star Is Born)"	Barbra Streisand	
March 18	"Rich Girl"	Hall & Oates	
March 25	"Rich Girl"	Hall & Oates	
April 1	"Hotel California"	Eagles	
April 8	"Hotel California"	Eagles	
April 15	"Hotel California"	Eagles	
April 22	"When I Need You"	Leo Sayer	
April 29	"When I Need You"	Leo Sayer	
May 6	"When I Need You"	Leo Sayer	
May 13	"When I Need You"	Leo Sayer	
May 20	"When I Need You"	Leo Sayer	
May 27	"Dreams"	Fleetwood Mac	
June 3	"Dreams"	Fleetwood Mac	
June 10	"Dreams"	Fleetwood Mac	
June 17	"Dreams"	Fleetwood Mac	
June 24	"Undercover Angel"	Alan O'Day	
July 1	"Undercover Angel"	Alan O'Day	
July 8	"Da Doo Ron Ron"	Shaun Cassidy	
July 15	"I'm in You"	Peter Frampton	
July 22	"I'm in You"	Peter Frampton	
July 29	"I Just Want to Be Your Everything"	Andy Gibb	
August 5	"I Just Want to Be Your Everything"	Andy Gibb	
August 12	"I Just Want to Be Your Everything"	Andy Gibb	
August 19	"Best of My Love"	The Emotions	
August 26	"Best of My Love"	The Emotions	
September 2	"Don't Stop"	Fleetwood Mac	
September 9	"Don't Stop"	Fleetwood Mac	
September 16	"Don't Stop"	Fleetwood Mac	
September 23	"Star Wars Theme/Cantina Band"	Meco	
September 30	"Star Wars Theme/Cantina Band"	Meco	
October 7	"Nobody Does It Better"	Carly Simon	
October 14	"You Light Up My Life"	Debby Boone	
October 21	"You Light Up My Life"	Debby Boone	
October 28	"You Light Up My Life"	Debby Boone	
November 4	"You Light Up My Life"	Debby Boone	
November 11	"You Light Up My Life"	Debby Boone	
November 18	"You Light Up My Life"	Debby Boone	
November 25	"How Deep Is Your Love"	Bee Gees	
December 2	"How Deep Is Your Love"	Bee Gees	
December 9	"How Deep Is Your Love"	Bee Gees	
December 16	"How Deep Is Your Love"	Bee Gees	
December 23	"Baby Come Back"	Player	

== 1978 ==
Issue Date	Song	Artist(s)	Reference
January 13	"You're in My Heart (The Final Acclaim)"	Rod Stewart	
January 20	"You're in My Heart (The Final Acclaim)"	Rod Stewart	
January 27	"Stayin' Alive"	Bee Gees	
February 3	"Stayin' Alive"	Bee Gees	
February 10	"Stayin' Alive"	Bee Gees	
February 17	"Stayin' Alive"	Bee Gees	
February 24	"Stayin' Alive"	Bee Gees	
March 3	"Stayin' Alive"	Bee Gees	
March 10	"Night Fever"	Bee Gees	
March 17	"Night Fever"	Bee Gees	
March 24	"Night Fever"	Bee Gees	
March 31	"Night Fever"	Bee Gees	
April 7	"Night Fever"	Bee Gees	
April 14	"Night Fever"	Bee Gees	
April 21	"If I Can't Have You"	Yvonne Elliman	
April 28	"If I Can't Have You"	Yvonne Elliman	
May 5	"With a Little Luck"	Wings	
May 12	"With a Little Luck"	Wings	
May 19	"With a Little Luck"	Wings	
May 26	"Shadow Dancing"	Andy Gibb	
June 2	"Shadow Dancing"	Andy Gibb	
June 9	"Shadow Dancing"	Andy Gibb	
June 16	"Shadow Dancing"	Andy Gibb	
June 23	"Baker Street"	Gerry Rafferty	
June 30	"Baker Street"	Gerry Rafferty	
July 7	"Baker Street"	Gerry Rafferty	
July 14	"Baker Street"	Gerry Rafferty	
July 21	"Miss You"	The Rolling Stones	
July 28	"Grease"	Frankie Valli	
August 4	"Three Times a Lady"	Commodores	
August 11	"Three Times a Lady"	Commodores	
August 18	"Three Times a Lady"	Commodores	
August 25	"Three Times a Lady"	Commodores	
September 1	"Three Times a Lady"	Commodores	
September 8	"Three Times a Lady"	Commodores	
September 15	"Kiss You All Over"	Exile	
September 22	"Kiss You All Over"	Exile	
September 29	"Kiss You All Over"	Exile	
October 6	"Kiss You All Over"	Exile	
October 13	"Kiss You All Over"	Exile	
October 20	"Hot Child in the City"	Nick Gilder	
October 27	"Whenever I Call You 'Friend'"	Kenny Loggins	
November 3	"MacArthur Park"	Donna Summer	
November 10	"MacArthur Park"	Donna Summer	
November 17	"MacArthur Park"	Donna Summer	
November 24	"You Don't Bring Me Flowers"	Neil Diamond & Barbra Streisand	
December 1	"You Don't Bring Me Flowers"	Neil Diamond & Barbra Streisand	
December 8	"You Don't Bring Me Flowers"	Neil Diamond & Barbra Streisand	
December 15	"Le Freak"	Chic	
December 22	"Le Freak"	Chic	

== 1979 ==
Issue Date	Song	Artist(s)	Reference
January 12	"Too Much Heaven"	Bee Gees	
January 19	"Too Much Heaven"	Bee Gees	
January 26	"Da Ya Think I'm Sexy?"	Rod Stewart	
February 2	"Da Ya Think I'm Sexy?"	Rod Stewart	
February 9	"Da Ya Think I'm Sexy?"	Rod Stewart	
February 16	"Da Ya Think I'm Sexy?"	Rod Stewart	
February 23	"Da Ya Think I'm Sexy?"	Rod Stewart	
March 2	"Da Ya Think I'm Sexy?"	Rod Stewart	
March 9	"Tragedy"	Bee Gees	
March 16	"Tragedy"	Bee Gees	
March 23	"What a Fool Believes"	The Doobie Brothers	
March 30	"What a Fool Believes"	The Doobie Brothers	
April 6	"What a Fool Believes"	The Doobie Brothers	
April 13	"Heart of Glass"	Blondie	
April 20	"Heart of Glass"	Blondie	
April 27	"Reunited"	Peaches & Herb	
May 4	"Reunited"	Peaches & Herb	
May 11	"Reunited"	Peaches & Herb	
May 18	"Reunited"	Peaches & Herb	
May 25	"Hot Stuff"	Donna Summer	
June 1	"Hot Stuff"	Donna Summer	
June 8	"The Logical Song"	Supertramp	
June 15	"Chuck E.'s In Love"	Rickie Lee Jones	
June 22	"Chuck E.'s In Love"	Rickie Lee Jones	
June 29	"She Believes in Me"	Kenny Rogers	
July 6	"Shine a Little Love"	Electric Light Orchestra	
July 13	"Gold"	John Stewart	
July 20	"Gold"	John Stewart	
July 27	"The Main Event/Fight"	Barbra Streisand	
August 3	"My Sharona"	The Knack	
August 10	"My Sharona"	The Knack	
August 17	"My Sharona"	The Knack	
August 24	"After the Love Has Gone"	Earth, Wind & Fire	
August 31	"Lonesome Loser"	Little River Band	
September 7	"Lonesome Loser"	Little River Band	
September 14	"Lonesome Loser"	Little River Band	
September 21	"Sail On"	Commodores	
September 28	"Sail On"	Commodores	
October 5	"Sail On"	Commodores	
October 12	"Rise"	Herb Alpert	
October 19	"Heartache Tonight"	Eagles	
October 26	"Heartache Tonight"	Eagles	
November 2	"Heartache Tonight"	Eagles	
November 9	"Heartache Tonight"	Eagles	
November 16	"Babe"	Styx	
November 23	"Babe"	Styx	
November 30	"Babe"	Styx	
December 7	"Escape (The Piña Colada Song)"	Rupert Holmes	
December 14	"Escape (The Piña Colada Song)"	Rupert Holmes	
December 21	"Escape (The Piña Colada Song)"	Rupert Holmes	
