= Money, Money, Money =

Single by ABBA

from the album Arrival
- B-side: "Crazy World"
- Released: 1 November 1976
- Recorded: 15 May 1976
- Studio: Metronome, Stockholm, Sweden
- Genre: Pop; schlager; disco
- Length: 3:05
- Label: Polar (Sweden); Epic (UK); Atlantic (US)
- Songwriters: Benny Andersson; Björn Ulvaeus
- Producers: Benny Andersson; Björn Ulvaeus

ABBA singles chronology
"Dancing Queen" (1976)	"Money, Money, Money" (1976)	"Knowing Me, Knowing You" (1977)

Music video
- "Money, Money, Money" on YouTube

"Money, Money, Money" is a song recorded by Swedish pop music group ABBA, written by Benny Andersson and Björn Ulvaeus with Anni-Frid Lyngstad singing lead vocals. It was released on 1 November 1976, as the second single from the group's fourth studio album, Arrival (1976). The B-side, "Crazy World", was recorded in 1975 during the sessions for the ABBA album. The song (originally titled "Gypsy Girl") is sung from the viewpoint of a woman who, despite hard work, can barely keep her finances in surplus, and therefore desires a well-off man.

ABBA perform parts of "Money, Money, Money" live in the 1977 film ABBA: The Movie. In the popular musical, Mamma Mia!, the song is sung by the character of Donna as she explains how hard she has to work to keep the taverna in order and her dreams of a better life.

== Reception ==
=== Critical ===
Billboard reviewed the single release and described it as a "fast paced" song with "lots of good-natured gimmicks" that is highlighted by its production. Cash Box said that it "is [ABBA's] cleverest [single] to date, adding humorous lyrics to the distilled pop hooks." Record World said that it "combines Brecht-Weill overtones with a typically sound ABBA pop structure" and that "the ironic lyric goes well with a haunting, music-hall-style tune." Jim Evans of Record Mirror provided a mostly favorably review, describing it as the "usual ABBA formula", albeit "not as strong as their last two hits ['Fernando' and 'Dancing Queen']."

=== Commercial ===
"Money, Money, Money" was the second worldwide hit from Arrival. The song became a number-one chart hit in Australia (ABBA's sixth consecutive chart-topper there), Belgium, France, West Germany, The Netherlands, Mexico and New Zealand, while reaching the top three in Austria, Ireland, Norway, Switzerland and the UK.

By peaking at No. 3 in the UK, "Money, Money, Money" was the only ABBA single between "Mamma Mia" in January 1976 and "Take a Chance on Me" in February 1978 not to top the UK chart. A British poll of "The Nation's Favourite ABBA song" in December 2010 saw "Money, Money, Money" placed at #22 (out of 25). As of September 2021, it is ABBA's 16th-biggest song in the UK, including both pure sales and digital streams.

As of September 1979 in Germany "Money, Money, Money" had sold over 300,000 units. French sales as of April 1977 stand at 500,000.

== Music video ==
The music video for "Money, Money, Money" was inspired by the film Cabaret, showing Frida wearing a hat typical of the 1920s. The video varies from her determined presence in reality during the verses, to the dream sequences about money and "the good life" in the chorus. The video's director, Lasse Hallström, later acknowledged "Money, Money, Money" as the best ABBA video he ever directed.

An alternate music video was filmed for the TV special ABBA-DABBA-DOOO!! featuring Agnetha and Frida in 1920s style flapper dresses, with feathers in their hair.

== Personnel ==
- Anni-Frid Lyngstad – lead vocals
- Agnetha Fältskog – backing vocals
- Björn Ulvaeus – backing vocals
- Benny Andersson – keyboards, synthesizer
- Anders Glenmark – guitar
- Rutger Gunnarsson – bass guitar

== Charts ==
=== Weekly charts ===
Initial weekly chart performance for "Money, Money, Money"
Chart (1976–77)	Peak position
Australia (Kent Music Report)	1
Austria (Ö3 Austria Top 40)	3
Belgium (Ultratop 50 Flanders)	1
Belgium (Ultratop 50 Wallonia)	1
Canada Top Singles (RPM)	47
Finland (Suomen virallinen lista)	7
France (SNEP)	1
Ireland (IRMA)	2
Mexico (Mexican Singles Chart)	1
Netherlands (Dutch Top 40)	1
Netherlands (Single Top 100)	1
New Zealand (Recorded Music NZ)	1
Norway (VG-lista)	2
Switzerland (Schweizer Hitparade)	2
UK Singles (Official Charts)	3
US Billboard Hot 100	56
US Adult Contemporary (Billboard)	38
US Cash Box Top 100 Singles	63
West Germany (GfK)	1

2007 weekly chart performance for "Dancing Queen"
Chart (2007)	Peak position
CIS Airplay (TopHit)	110
Russia Airplay (TopHit)	107

2016 weekly chart performance for "Money, Money, Money"
Chart (2016)	Peak position
UK Singles (Official Charts)	5
UK Vinyl Singles (OCC)	4

=== Monthly charts ===
Monthly chart performance for "Money, Money, Money"
Chart (1977)	Peak position
Soviet Union International Songs (MK)	3

=== Year-end charts ===
1976 year-end chart performance for "Money, Money, Money"
Chart (1976)	Peak position
Belgium (Ultratop Flanders)	61
Germany (Official German Charts)	21
Netherlands (Dutch Top 40)	36
Netherlands (Single Top 100)	22

1977 year-end chart performance for "Money, Money, Money"
Chart (1977)	Peak position
Australia (Kent Music Report)	7
Belgium (Ultratop Flanders)	52
US (Joel Whitburn's Pop Annual)	281

== Certifications and sales ==
Region	Certification	Certified units/sales
Australia	—	244,000
Denmark (IFPI Danmark)	Gold	45,000^{‡}
France (SNEP)	Gold	500,000^{*}
Germany	—	300,000
Kenya	—	10,000
New Zealand (RMNZ)	Platinum	30,000^{‡}
Portugal	—	20,000
United Kingdom (BPI)	Gold	500,000^{^}
United Kingdom (BPI) Mamma Mia! version	Silver	200,000^{‡}
Yugoslavia	Silver	60,000
Summaries
Worldwide	—	3,000,000
^{*} Sales figures based on certification alone.^{^} Shipments figures based on certification alone.^{‡} Sales+streaming figures based on certification alone.

== See also ==
- List of number-one singles in Australia during the 1970s
- List of Dutch Top 40 number-one singles of 1976
- List of European number-one hits of 1976
- List of number-one hits of 1976 (France)
- List of number-one hits of 1976 (Germany)
- List of number-one singles in 1976 (New Zealand)
