= List of European number-one hits of 1976 =

This is a list of the Europarade number-one singles of 1976.

Date	Song	Artist
29 May	"Save Your Kisses For Me"	Brotherhood of Man
5 June	"Save Your Kisses For Me"	Brotherhood of Man
12 June	"Save Your Kisses For Me"	Brotherhood of Man
19 June	"Save Your Kisses For Me"	Brotherhood of Man
26 June	"Save Your Kisses For Me"	Brotherhood of Man
3 July	"Save Your Kisses For Me"	Brotherhood of Man
10 July	"Show Me The Way"	Peter Frampton
17 July	"Show Me The Way"	Peter Frampton
24 July	"Arms of Mary"	Sutherland Brothers & Quiver
31 July	"You to Me Are Everything"	The Real Thing
7 August	"You to Me Are Everything"	The Real Thing
14 August	"Kiss and Say Goodbye"	The Manhattans
21 August	"Kiss and Say Goodbye"	The Manhattans
28 August	"Don't Go Breaking My Heart"	Elton John & Kiki Dee
4 September	"Dancing Queen"	ABBA
11 September	"Dancing Queen"	ABBA
18 September	"Dancing Queen"	ABBA
25 September	"Dancing Queen"	ABBA
2 October	"Dancing Queen"	ABBA
9 October	"Dancing Queen"	ABBA
16 October	"Dancing Queen"	ABBA
23 October	"Dancing Queen"	ABBA
30 October	"Dancing Queen"	ABBA
6 November	"Dancing Queen"	ABBA
13 November	"Daddy Cool"	Boney M.
20 November	"Daddy Cool"	Boney M.
27 November	"Daddy Cool"	Boney M.
4 December	"Daddy Cool"	Boney M.
11 December	"Money, Money, Money"	ABBA
18 December	"Money, Money, Money"	ABBA
25 December	"Money, Money, Money"	ABBA
