= It Feels So Good (album) =

Studio album by the Manhattans
- Released: 1977
- Studio: Total Experience (Hollywood, California)
- Genre: Soul, R&B
- Label: Columbia
- Producer: Bobby Martin

The Manhattans chronology
The Manhattans (1976)	It Feels So Good (1977)	There's No Good in Goodbye (1978)

Professional ratings
Review scores
Source	Rating
AllMusic	3/5 stars

It Feels So Good is the eighth studio album by American vocal group the Manhattans, released in 1977 through Columbia Records. This album has been Certified Gold by the R.I.A.A.

== Reception ==
The album peaked at No. 12 on the R&B albums chart. It also reached No. 68 on the Billboard 200. The album features the singles "I Kinda Miss You", which peaked at No. 7 on the Hot Soul Singles chart and No. 46 on the Billboard Hot 100, "It Feels So Good to Be Loved So Bad", which charted at No. 6 on the Hot Soul Singles chart and No. 66 on the Billboard Hot 100, and "We Never Danced to a Love Song", which reached No. 10 on the Hot Soul Singles chart and No. 93 on the Billboard Hot 100.

== Track listing ==
Side one
No.	Title	Writer(s)	Length
1.	"I Kinda Miss You"	Winfred Lovett	5:17
2.	"Up on the Street (Where I Live)"	Kenneth Kelly	3:35
3.	"Let's Start It All Over Again"	Edward Bivins	5:15
4.	"It's You"	Winfred Lovett	4:02
5.	"I'll See You Tomorrow"	Winfred Lovett	3:10

Side two
No.	Title	Writer(s)	Length
1.	"It Feels So Good to Be Loved So Bad"	Teddy Randazzo, Victoria Pike, Roger Joyce	4:35
2.	"It Just Can't Stay This Way"	Edward Bivins	5:17
3.	"We Never Danced to a Love Song"	Gerald Alston, Edward Bivins	4:20
4.	"Mind Your Business"	Winfred Lovett	3:47
5.	"Too Much for Me to Bear"	Robert S. Riley Sr.	3:41

== Charts ==
Album

Chart (1977)	Peaks
U.S. Billboard Top LPs	68
U.S. Billboard Top Soul LPs	12

Singles

Year	Single	Peaks	
Year	Single	US	US R&B
1976	"I Kinda Miss You"	46	7
1977	"It Feels So Good to Be Loved So Bad"	66	6
1977	"We Never Danced to a Love Song"	93	10
