= List of Radio & Records number-one singles of the 1980s =

This is a list of songs that have been number one on the Radio & Records singles chart in the 1980s.

== 1980 ==
Issue Date	Song	Artist(s)	Reference
January 11	"The Long Run"	Eagles	
January 18	"The Long Run"	Eagles	
January 25	"Sara"	Fleetwood Mac	
February 1	"Longer"	Dan Fogelberg	
February 8	"Longer"	Dan Fogelberg	
February 15	"Crazy Little Thing Called Love"	Queen	
February 22	"Crazy Little Thing Called Love"	Queen	
February 29	"Crazy Little Thing Called Love"	Queen	
March 7	"Another Brick in the Wall, Part 2"	Pink Floyd	
March 14	"Another Brick in the Wall, Part 2"	Pink Floyd	
March 21	"Another Brick in the Wall, Part 2"	Pink Floyd	
March 28	"Call Me"	Blondie	
April 4	"Call Me"	Blondie	
April 11	"Call Me"	Blondie	
April 18	"Call Me"	Blondie	
April 25	"Call Me"	Blondie	
May 2	"Call Me"	Blondie	
May 9	"Biggest Part of Me"	Ambrosia	
May 16	"Biggest Part of Me"	Ambrosia	
May 23	"Biggest Part of Me"	Ambrosia	
May 30	"Biggest Part of Me"	Ambrosia	
June 6	"The Rose"	Bette Midler	
June 13	"Coming Up"	Paul McCartney	
June 20	"It's Still Rock and Roll to Me"	Billy Joel	
June 27	"It's Still Rock and Roll to Me"	Billy Joel	
July 4	"It's Still Rock and Roll to Me"	Billy Joel	
July 11	"It's Still Rock and Roll to Me"	Billy Joel	
July 18	"Magic"	Olivia Newton-John	
July 25	"Magic"	Olivia Newton-John	
August 1	"Sailing"	Christopher Cross	
August 8	"Sailing"	Christopher Cross	
August 15	"Sailing"	Christopher Cross	
August 22	"Sailing"	Christopher Cross	
August 29	"All Out of Love"	Air Supply	
September 5	"All Out of Love"	Air Supply	
September 12	"Upside Down"	Diana Ross	
September 19	"Late in the Evening"	Paul Simon	
September 26	"Late in the Evening"	Paul Simon	
October 3	"Real Love"	The Doobie Brothers	
October 10	"Real Love"	The Doobie Brothers	
October 17	"Woman in Love"	Barbra Streisand	
October 24	"Woman in Love"	Barbra Streisand	
October 31	"Woman in Love"	Barbra Streisand	
November 7	"Lady"	Kenny Rogers	
November 14	"Lady"	Kenny Rogers	
November 21	"Lady"	Kenny Rogers	
November 28	"Lady"	Kenny Rogers	
December 5	"Lady"	Kenny Rogers	
December 12	"Love on the Rocks"	Neil Diamond	
December 19	"(Just Like) Starting Over"	John Lennon	

== 1981 ==
Issue Date	Song	Artist(s)	Reference
January 9	"(Just Like) Starting Over"	John Lennon	
January 16	"The Tide Is High"	Blondie	
January 23	"The Tide Is High"	Blondie	
January 30	"The Tide Is High"	Blondie	
February 6	"Woman"	John Lennon	
February 13	"Woman"	John Lennon	
February 20	"Woman"	John Lennon	
February 27	"Woman"	John Lennon	
March 6	"The Best of Times"	Styx	
March 13	"The Best of Times"	Styx	
March 20	"The Best of Times"	Styx	
March 27	"Kiss on My List"	Hall & Oates	
April 3	"Kiss on My List"	Hall & Oates	
April 10	"While You See a Chance"	Steve Winwood	
April 17	"Just the Two of Us"	Grover Washington, Jr. & Bill Withers	
April 24	"Just the Two of Us"	Grover Washington, Jr. & Bill Withers	
May 1	"Being with You"	Smokey Robinson	
May 8	"Being with You"	Smokey Robinson	
May 15	"Bette Davis Eyes"	Kim Carnes	
May 22	"Bette Davis Eyes"	Kim Carnes	
May 29	"Bette Davis Eyes"	Kim Carnes	
June 5	"Bette Davis Eyes"	Kim Carnes	
June 12	"Bette Davis Eyes"	Kim Carnes	
June 19	"All Those Years Ago"	George Harrison	
June 26	"All Those Years Ago"	George Harrison	
July 3	"The One That You Love"	Air Supply	
July 10	"The One That You Love"	Air Supply	
July 17	"The One That You Love"	Air Supply	
July 24	"Theme from The Greatest American Hero (Believe It or Not)"	Joey Scarbury	
July 31	"Slow Hand"	The Pointer Sisters	
August 7	"Slow Hand"	The Pointer Sisters	
August 14	"Endless Love"	Diana Ross & Lionel Richie	
August 21	"Endless Love"	Diana Ross & Lionel Richie	
August 28	"Endless Love"	Diana Ross & Lionel Richie	
September 4	"Endless Love"	Diana Ross & Lionel Richie	
September 11	"Endless Love"	Diana Ross & Lionel Richie	
September 18	"Who's Crying Now"	Journey	
September 25	"Arthur's Theme (Best That You Can Do)"	Christopher Cross	
October 2	"Arthur's Theme (Best That You Can Do)"	Christopher Cross	
October 9	"Arthur's Theme (Best That You Can Do)"	Christopher Cross	
October 16	"Arthur's Theme (Best That You Can Do)"	Christopher Cross	
October 23	"Private Eyes"	Hall & Oates	
October 30	"Private Eyes"	Hall & Oates	
November 6	"Waiting for a Girl Like You"	Foreigner	
November 13	"Waiting for a Girl Like You"	Foreigner	
November 20	"Waiting for a Girl Like You"	Foreigner	
November 27	"Waiting for a Girl Like You"	Foreigner	
December 4	"Waiting for a Girl Like You"	Foreigner	
December 11	"Waiting for a Girl Like You"	Foreigner	
December 18	"I Can't Go for That (No Can Do)"	Hall & Oates	

== 1982 ==
Issue Date	Song	Artist(s)	Reference
January 8	"I Can't Go for That (No Can Do)"	Hall & Oates	
January 15	"I Can't Go for That (No Can Do)"	Hall & Oates	
January 22	"I Can't Go for That (No Can Do)"	Hall & Oates	
January 29	"I Can't Go for That (No Can Do)"	Hall & Oates	
February 5	"I Can't Go for That (No Can Do)"	Hall & Oates	
February 12	"Open Arms"	Journey	
February 19	"Open Arms"	Journey	
February 26	"Open Arms"	Journey	
March 5	"Open Arms"	Journey	
March 12	"Open Arms"	Journey	
March 19	"Open Arms"	Journey	
March 26	"Open Arms"	Journey	
April 2	"Make a Move on Me"	Olivia Newton-John	
April 9	"Don't Talk to Strangers"	Rick Springfield	
April 16	"Don't Talk to Strangers"	Rick Springfield	
April 23	"Don't Talk to Strangers"	Rick Springfield	
April 30	"Don't Talk to Strangers"	Rick Springfield	
May 7	"Don't Talk to Strangers"	Rick Springfield	
May 14	"Ebony and Ivory"	Paul McCartney & Stevie Wonder	
May 21	"Ebony and Ivory"	Paul McCartney & Stevie Wonder	
May 28	"Ebony and Ivory"	Paul McCartney & Stevie Wonder	
June 4	"Ebony and Ivory"	Paul McCartney & Stevie Wonder	
June 11	"Rosanna"	Toto	
June 18	"Rosanna"	Toto	
June 25	"Rosanna"	Toto	
July 2	"Rosanna"	Toto	
July 9	"Eye of the Tiger"	Survivor	
July 16	"Eye of the Tiger"	Survivor	
July 23	"Eye of the Tiger"	Survivor	
July 30	"Eye of the Tiger"	Survivor	
August 6	"Eye of the Tiger"	Survivor	
August 13	"Hard to Say I'm Sorry"	Chicago	
August 20	"Hard to Say I'm Sorry"	Chicago	
August 27	"Hard to Say I'm Sorry"	Chicago	
September 3	"Hard to Say I'm Sorry"	Chicago	
September 10	"Jack & Diane"	John Cougar	
September 17	"Jack & Diane"	John Cougar	
September 24	"Jack & Diane"	John Cougar	
October 1	"I Keep Forgettin' (Every Time You're Near)"	Michael McDonald	
October 8	"I Keep Forgettin' (Every Time You're Near)"	Michael McDonald	
October 15	"I Keep Forgettin' (Every Time You're Near)"	Michael McDonald	
October 22	"Gypsy"	Fleetwood Mac	
October 29	"Up Where We Belong"	Joe Cocker & Jennifer Warnes	
November 5	"Up Where We Belong"	Joe Cocker & Jennifer Warnes	
November 12	"Up Where We Belong"	Joe Cocker & Jennifer Warnes	
November 19	"Truly"	Lionel Richie	
November 26	"Maneater"	Hall & Oates	
December 3	"Maneater"	Hall & Oates	
December 10	"Maneater"	Hall & Oates	
December 17	"Maneater"	Hall & Oates	

== 1983 ==
Issue Date	Song	Artist(s)	Reference
January 7	"Down Under"	Men at Work	
January 14	"Down Under"	Men at Work	
January 21	"Down Under"	Men at Work	
January 28	"Down Under"	Men at Work	
February 4	"Down Under"	Men at Work	
February 11	"Shame on the Moon"	Bob Seger & The Silver Bullet Band	
February 18	"Do You Really Want to Hurt Me"	Culture Club	
February 25	"Do You Really Want to Hurt Me"	Culture Club	
March 4	"You Are"	Lionel Richie	
March 11	"Billie Jean"	Michael Jackson	
March 18	"Billie Jean"	Michael Jackson	
March 25	"Separate Ways (Worlds Apart)"	Journey	
April 1	"Separate Ways (Worlds Apart)"	Journey	
April 8	"Jeopardy"	The Greg Kihn Band	
April 15	"Jeopardy"	The Greg Kihn Band	
April 22	"Jeopardy"	The Greg Kihn Band	
April 29	"Beat It"	Michael Jackson	
May 6	"Overkill"	Men at Work	
May 13	"Overkill"	Men at Work	
May 20	"Overkill"	Men at Work	
May 27	"Flashdance... What a Feeling"	Irene Cara	
June 3	"Flashdance... What a Feeling"	Irene Cara	
June 10	"Flashdance... What a Feeling"	Irene Cara	
June 17	"Flashdance... What a Feeling"	Irene Cara	
June 24	"Flashdance... What a Feeling"	Irene Cara	
July 1	"Every Breath You Take"	The Police	
July 8	"Every Breath You Take"	The Police	
July 15	"Every Breath You Take"	The Police	
July 22	"Every Breath You Take"	The Police	
July 29	"Every Breath You Take"	The Police	
August 5	"Every Breath You Take"	The Police	
August 12	"Every Breath You Take"	The Police	
August 19	"Every Breath You Take"	The Police	
August 26	"Maniac"	Michael Sembello	
September 2	"Tell Her About It"	Billy Joel	
September 9	"Tell Her About It"	Billy Joel	
September 16	"Tell Her About It"	Billy Joel	
September 23	"Total Eclipse of the Heart"	Bonnie Tyler	
September 30	"Total Eclipse of the Heart"	Bonnie Tyler	
October 7	"Total Eclipse of the Heart"	Bonnie Tyler	
October 14	"King of Pain"	The Police	
October 21	"King of Pain"	The Police	
October 28	"All Night Long (All Night)"	Lionel Richie	
November 4	"All Night Long (All Night)"	Lionel Richie	
November 11	"All Night Long (All Night)"	Lionel Richie	
November 18	"Say Say Say"	Paul McCartney & Michael Jackson	
November 25	"Say Say Say"	Paul McCartney & Michael Jackson	
December 2	"Say Say Say"	Paul McCartney & Michael Jackson	
December 9	"Say Say Say"	Paul McCartney & Michael Jackson	
December 16	"Say Say Say"	Paul McCartney & Michael Jackson	

== 1984 ==
Issue Date	Song	Artist(s)	Reference
January 6	"Owner of a Lonely Heart"	Yes	
January 13	"Owner of a Lonely Heart"	Yes	
January 20	"Karma Chameleon"	Culture Club	
January 27	"Karma Chameleon"	Culture Club	
February 3	"Karma Chameleon"	Culture Club	
February 10	"Thriller"	Michael Jackson	
February 17	"Jump"	Van Halen	
February 24	"Jump"	Van Halen	
March 2	"Jump"	Van Halen	
March 9	"Jump"	Van Halen	
March 16	"Jump"	Van Halen	
March 23	"Footloose"	Kenny Loggins	
March 30	"Footloose"	Kenny Loggins	
April 6	"Footloose"	Kenny Loggins	
April 13	"Against All Odds (Take a Look at Me Now)"	Phil Collins	
April 20	"Against All Odds (Take a Look at Me Now)"	Phil Collins	
April 27	"Against All Odds (Take a Look at Me Now)"	Phil Collins	
May 4	"Against All Odds (Take a Look at Me Now)"	Phil Collins	
May 11	"Let's Hear It for the Boy"	Deniece Williams	
May 18	"Let's Hear It for the Boy"	Deniece Williams	
May 25	"Let's Hear It for the Boy"	Deniece Williams	
June 1	"Time After Time"	Cyndi Lauper	
June 8	"Time After Time"	Cyndi Lauper	
June 15	"Time After Time"	Cyndi Lauper	
June 22	"The Reflex"	Duran Duran	
June 29	"Dancing in the Dark"	Bruce Springsteen	
July 6	"When Doves Cry"	Prince	
July 13	"When Doves Cry"	Prince	
July 20	"When Doves Cry"	Prince	
July 27	"When Doves Cry"	Prince	
August 3	"Ghostbusters"	Ray Parker Jr.	
August 10	"Ghostbusters"	Ray Parker Jr.	
August 17	"Ghostbusters"	Ray Parker Jr.	
August 24	"Stuck on You"	Lionel Richie	
August 31	"Missing You"	John Waite	
September 7	"Missing You"	John Waite	
September 14	"Let's Go Crazy"	Prince and The Revolution	
September 21	"Let's Go Crazy"	Prince and The Revolution	
September 28	"Let's Go Crazy"	Prince and The Revolution	
October 5	"Let's Go Crazy"	Prince and The Revolution	
October 12	"Hard Habit to Break"	Chicago	
October 19	"I Just Called to Say I Love You"	Stevie Wonder	
October 26	"I Just Called to Say I Love You"	Stevie Wonder	
November 2	"Purple Rain"	Prince and The Revolution	
November 9	"Purple Rain"	Prince and The Revolution	
November 16	"Wake Me Up Before You Go-Go"	Wham!	
November 23	"Wake Me Up Before You Go-Go"	Wham!	
November 30	"Out of Touch"	Hall & Oates	
December 7	"The Wild Boys"	Duran Duran	
December 14	"Like a Virgin"	Madonna	
December 21	"Like a Virgin"	Madonna	

== 1985 ==
Issue Date	Song	Artist(s)	Reference
January 11	"Like a Virgin"	Madonna	
January 18	"You're the Inspiration"	Chicago	
January 25	"I Want to Know What Love Is"	Foreigner	
February 1	"I Want to Know What Love Is"	Foreigner	
February 8	"Careless Whisper"	Wham!	
February 15	"Careless Whisper"	Wham!	
February 22	"Can't Fight This Feeling"	REO Speedwagon	
March 1	"Can't Fight This Feeling"	REO Speedwagon	
March 8	"Can't Fight This Feeling"	REO Speedwagon	
March 15	"Can't Fight This Feeling"	REO Speedwagon	
March 22	"Material Girl"	Madonna	
March 29	"One More Night"	Phil Collins	
April 5	"We Are the World"	USA for Africa	
April 12	"We Are the World"	USA for Africa	
April 19	"We Are the World"	USA for Africa	
April 26	"Crazy for You"	Madonna	
May 3	"Crazy for You"	Madonna	
May 10	"Don't You (Forget About Me)"	Simple Minds	
May 17	"Don't You (Forget About Me)"	Simple Minds	
May 24	"Everything She Wants"	Wham!	
May 31	"Everybody Wants to Rule the World"	Tears for Fears	
June 7	"Everybody Wants to Rule the World"	Tears for Fears	
June 14	"Heaven"	Bryan Adams	
June 21	"Sussudio"	Phil Collins	
June 28	"Sussudio"	Phil Collins	
July 5	"Raspberry Beret"	Prince and The Revolution	
July 12	"A View to a Kill"	Duran Duran	
July 19	"Everytime You Go Away"	Paul Young	
July 26	"Shout"	Tears for Fears	
August 2	"Shout"	Tears for Fears	
August 9	"Shout"	Tears for Fears	
August 16	"The Power of Love"	Huey Lewis and the News	
August 23	"The Power of Love"	Huey Lewis and the News	
August 30	"The Power of Love"	Huey Lewis and the News	
September 6	"St. Elmo's Fire (Man in Motion)"	John Parr	
September 13	"Money for Nothing"	Dire Straits	
September 20	"Money for Nothing"	Dire Straits	
September 27	"Money for Nothing"	Dire Straits	
October 4	"Take On Me"	A-ha	
October 11	"Take On Me"	A-ha	
October 18	"Take On Me"	A-ha	
October 25	"Part-Time Lover"	Stevie Wonder	
November 1	"Part-Time Lover"	Stevie Wonder	
November 8	"We Built This City"	Starship	
November 15	"We Built This City"	Starship	
November 22	"Separate Lives"	Phil Collins & Marilyn Martin	
November 29	"Separate Lives"	Phil Collins & Marilyn Martin	
December 6	"Broken Wings"	Mr. Mister	
December 13	"Say You, Say Me"	Lionel Richie	
December 20	"Say You, Say Me"	Lionel Richie	

== 1986 ==
Issue Date	Song	Artist(s)	Reference
January 3	"Say You, Say Me"	Lionel Richie	
January 10	"Say You, Say Me"	Lionel Richie	
January 17	"That's What Friends Are For"	Dionne & Friends (Dionne Warwick, Elton John, Gladys Knight, and Stevie Wonder)	
January 24	"That's What Friends Are For"	Dionne & Friends (Dionne Warwick, Elton John, Gladys Knight, and Stevie Wonder)	
January 31	"When the Going Gets Tough, the Tough Get Going"	Billy Ocean	
February 7	"How Will I Know"	Whitney Houston	
February 14	"How Will I Know"	Whitney Houston	
February 21	"Kyrie"	Mr. Mister	
February 28	"Kyrie"	Mr. Mister	
March 7	"These Dreams"	Heart	
March 14	"These Dreams"	Heart	
March 21	"Rock Me Amadeus"	Falco	
March 28	"Rock Me Amadeus"	Falco	
April 4	"Rock Me Amadeus"	Falco	
April 11	"Kiss"	Prince and The Revolution	
April 18	"Addicted to Love"	Robert Palmer	
April 25	"West End Girls"	Pet Shop Boys	
May 2	"West End Girls"	Pet Shop Boys	
May 9	"The Greatest Love of All"	Whitney Houston	
May 16	"The Greatest Love of All"	Whitney Houston	
May 23	"Live to Tell"	Madonna	
May 30	"Live to Tell"	Madonna	
June 6	"Live to Tell"	Madonna	
June 13	"On My Own"	Patti LaBelle & Michael McDonald	
June 20	"No One Is to Blame"	Howard Jones	
June 27	"There'll Be Sad Songs (To Make You Cry)"	Billy Ocean	
July 4	"Invisible Touch"	Genesis	
July 11	"Invisible Touch"	Genesis	
July 18	"Sledgehammer"	Peter Gabriel	
July 25	"Glory of Love"	Peter Cetera	
August 1	"Glory of Love"	Peter Cetera	
August 8	"Papa Don't Preach"	Madonna	
August 15	"Papa Don't Preach"	Madonna	
August 22	"Higher Love"	Steve Winwood	
August 29	"Higher Love"	Steve Winwood	
September 5	"Dancing on the Ceiling"	Lionel Richie	
September 12	"Stuck with You"	Huey Lewis and the News	
September 19	"Stuck with You"	Huey Lewis and the News	
September 26	"Stuck with You"	Huey Lewis and the News	
October 3	"Throwing It All Away"	Genesis	
October 10	"When I Think of You"	Janet Jackson	
October 17	"Typical Male"	Tina Turner	
October 24	"True Colors"	Cyndi Lauper	
October 31	"Amanda"	Boston	
November 7	"Amanda"	Boston	
November 14	"Amanda"	Boston	
November 21	"Hip to Be Square"	Huey Lewis and the News	
November 28	"The Way It Is"	Bruce Hornsby & The Range	
December 5	"The Way It Is"	Bruce Hornsby & The Range	
December 12	"Everybody Have Fun Tonight"	Wang Chung	
December 19	"Walk Like an Egyptian"	The Bangles	

== 1987 ==
Issue Date	Song	Artist(s)	Reference
January 2	"Walk Like an Egyptian"	The Bangles	
January 9	"Shake You Down"	Gregory Abbott	
January 16	"At This Moment"	Billy Vera & The Beaters	
January 23	"Open Your Heart"	Madonna	
January 30	"Open Your Heart"	Madonna	
February 6	"Livin' on a Prayer"	Bon Jovi	
February 13	"Livin' on a Prayer"	Bon Jovi	
February 20	"Livin' on a Prayer"	Bon Jovi	
February 27	"Jacob's Ladder"	Huey Lewis and the News	
March 6	"Jacob's Ladder"	Huey Lewis and the News	
March 13	"Lean on Me"	Club Nouveau	
March 20	"Lean on Me"	Club Nouveau	
March 27	"Nothing's Gonna Stop Us Now"	Starship	
April 3	"Nothing's Gonna Stop Us Now"	Starship	
April 10	"I Knew You Were Waiting (For Me)"	Aretha Franklin & George Michael	
April 17	"I Knew You Were Waiting (For Me)"	Aretha Franklin & George Michael	
April 24	"(I Just) Died in Your Arms"	Cutting Crew	
May 1	"(I Just) Died in Your Arms"	Cutting Crew	
May 8	"With or Without You"	U2	
May 15	"With or Without You"	U2	
May 22	"With or Without You"	U2	
May 29	"You Keep Me Hangin' On"	Kim Wilde	
June 5	"Always"	Atlantic Starr	
June 12	"Head to Toe"	Lisa Lisa and Cult Jam	
June 19	"I Wanna Dance with Somebody (Who Loves Me)"	Whitney Houston	
June 26	"I Wanna Dance with Somebody (Who Loves Me)"	Whitney Houston	
July 3	"I Wanna Dance with Somebody (Who Loves Me)"	Whitney Houston	
July 10	"Alone"	Heart	
July 17	"Alone"	Heart	
July 24	"Shakedown"	Bob Seger	
July 31	"I Still Haven't Found What I'm Looking For"	U2	
August 7	"Who's That Girl"	Madonna	
August 14	"Who's That Girl"	Madonna	
August 21	"La Bamba"	Los Lobos	
August 28	"La Bamba"	Los Lobos	
September 4	"I Just Can't Stop Loving You"	Michael Jackson featuring Siedah Garrett	
September 11	"I Just Can't Stop Loving You"	Michael Jackson featuring Siedah Garrett	
September 18	"Didn't We Almost Have It All"	Whitney Houston	
September 25	"Here I Go Again"	Whitesnake	
October 2	"Carrie"	Europe	
October 9	"Lost in Emotion"	Lisa Lisa and Cult Jam	
October 16	"Bad"	Michael Jackson	
October 23	"Bad"	Michael Jackson	
October 30	"I Think We're Alone Now"	Tiffany	
November 6	"I Think We're Alone Now"	Tiffany	
November 13	"Mony Mony (Live)"	Billy Idol	
November 20	"(I've Had) The Time of My Life"	Bill Medley & Jennifer Warnes	
November 27	"Heaven Is a Place on Earth"	Belinda Carlisle	
December 4	"Faith"	George Michael	
December 11	"Faith"	George Michael	
December 18	"Faith"	George Michael	

== 1988 ==
Issue Date	Song	Artist(s)	Reference
January 1	"So Emotional"	Whitney Houston	
January 8	"Got My Mind Set on You"	George Harrison	
January 15	"The Way You Make Me Feel"	Michael Jackson	
January 22	"Need You Tonight"	INXS	
January 29	"Could've Been"	Tiffany	
February 5	"Could've Been"	Tiffany	
February 12	"Father Figure"	George Michael	
February 19	"Father Figure"	George Michael	
February 26	"Father Figure"	George Michael	
March 4	"Father Figure"	George Michael	
March 11	"Never Gonna Give You Up"	Rick Astley	
March 18	"Man in the Mirror"	Michael Jackson	
March 25	"Man in the Mirror"	Michael Jackson	
April 1	"Man in the Mirror"	Michael Jackson	
April 8	"Get Outta My Dreams, Get into My Car"	Billy Ocean	
April 15	"Get Outta My Dreams, Get into My Car"	Billy Ocean	
April 22	"Where Do Broken Hearts Go"	Whitney Houston	
April 29	"Anything for You"	Gloria Estefan and Miami Sound Machine	
May 6	"Anything for You"	Gloria Estefan and Miami Sound Machine	
May 13	"One More Try"	George Michael	
May 20	"One More Try"	George Michael	
May 27	"One More Try"	George Michael	
June 3	"One More Try"	George Michael	
June 10	"Together Forever"	Rick Astley	
June 17	"Foolish Beat"	Debbie Gibson	
June 24	"Dirty Diana"	Michael Jackson	
July 1	"The Flame"	Cheap Trick	
July 8	"The Flame"	Cheap Trick	
July 15	"Pour Some Sugar on Me"	Def Leppard	
July 22	"Roll with It"	Steve Winwood	
July 29	"Roll with It"	Steve Winwood	
August 5	"Roll with It"	Steve Winwood	
August 12	"Monkey"	George Michael	
August 19	"Monkey"	George Michael	
August 26	"Monkey"	George Michael	
September 2	"Sweet Child o' Mine"	Guns N' Roses	
September 9	"Sweet Child o' Mine"	Guns N' Roses	
September 16	"Don't Worry, Be Happy"	Bobby McFerrin	
September 23	"Love Bites"	Def Leppard	
September 30	"Love Bites"	Def Leppard	
October 7	"Red Red Wine"	UB40	
October 14	"A Groovy Kind of Love"	Phil Collins	
October 21	"A Groovy Kind of Love"	Phil Collins	
October 28	"Kokomo"	The Beach Boys	
November 4	"Kokomo"	The Beach Boys	
November 11	"Wild, Wild West"	The Escape Club	
November 18	"Baby, I Love Your Way/Freebird Medley"	Will to Power	
November 25	"Baby, I Love Your Way/Freebird Medley"	Will to Power	
December 2	"Look Away"	Chicago	
December 9	"Look Away"	Chicago	
December 16	"Every Rose Has Its Thorn"	Poison	
December 23	"Every Rose Has Its Thorn"	Poison	

== 1989 ==
Issue Date	Song	Artist(s)	Reference
January 6	"Two Hearts"	Phil Collins	
January 13	"Two Hearts"	Phil Collins	
January 20	"When I'm with You"	Sheriff	
January 27	"When I'm with You"	Sheriff	
February 3	"Straight Up"	Paula Abdul	
February 10	"Straight Up"	Paula Abdul	
February 17	"Lost in Your Eyes"	Debbie Gibson	
February 24	"Lost in Your Eyes"	Debbie Gibson	
March 3	"Lost in Your Eyes"	Debbie Gibson	
March 10	"Lost in Your Eyes"	Debbie Gibson	
March 17	"Eternal Flame"	The Bangles	
March 24	"Eternal Flame"	The Bangles	
March 31	"The Look"	Roxette	
April 7	"She Drives Me Crazy"	Fine Young Cannibals	
April 14	"Like a Prayer"	Madonna	
April 21	"Like a Prayer"	Madonna	
April 28	"Like a Prayer"	Madonna	
May 5	"I'll Be There for You"	Bon Jovi	
May 12	"Forever Your Girl"	Paula Abdul	
May 19	"Forever Your Girl"	Paula Abdul	
May 26	"Rock On"	Michael Damian	
June 2	"I'll Be Loving You (Forever)"	New Kids on the Block	
June 9	"I'll Be Loving You (Forever)"	New Kids on the Block	
June 16	"Satisfied"	Richard Marx	
June 23	"Satisfied"	Richard Marx	
June 30	"Good Thing"	Fine Young Cannibals	
July 7	"If You Don't Know Me by Now"	Simply Red	
July 14	"If You Don't Know Me by Now"	Simply Red	
July 21	"Toy Soldiers"	Martika	
July 28	"Batdance"	Prince	
August 4	"Right Here Waiting"	Richard Marx	
August 11	"Right Here Waiting"	Richard Marx	
August 18	"Right Here Waiting"	Richard Marx	
August 25	"Cold Hearted"	Paula Abdul	
September 1	"Hangin' Tough"	New Kids on the Block	
September 8	"Don't Wanna Lose You"	Gloria Estefan	
September 15	"Girl I'm Gonna Miss You"	Milli Vanilli	
September 22	"Girl I'm Gonna Miss You"	Milli Vanilli	
September 29	"Cherish"	Madonna	
October 6	"Miss You Much"	Janet Jackson	
October 13	"Miss You Much"	Janet Jackson	
October 20	"Miss You Much"	Janet Jackson	
October 27	"Listen to Your Heart"	Roxette	
November 3	"When I See You Smile"	Bad English	
November 10	"When I See You Smile"	Bad English	
November 17	"Blame It on the Rain"	Milli Vanilli	
November 24	"Blame It on the Rain"	Milli Vanilli	
December 1	"Another Day in Paradise" (Note: "Another Day in Paradise" spent an additional week at number one in 1990.)	Phil Collins	
December 8	"Another Day in Paradise"	Phil Collins	
December 15	"Another Day in Paradise"	Phil Collins	
December 22	"Another Day in Paradise"	Phil Collins	

== Sources ==
- http://wweb.uta.edu/faculty/gghunt/charts/chart.html
