= Radio y Musica Convention =

Radio y Musica (Annual Latin Music)

Radio y Musica was an annual Latin music event hosted in Los Angeles and Puerto Rico from 1991 to 1997. Many Latin artists made their debut during these annual events including Marc Anthony, Shakira, Alejandro Fernández, Olga Tañón and Graciela Beltrán. The convention was owned by Alfredo Alonso who also ran the weekly trade publication Radio y Musica. The business was sold in 2000 to Radio & Records based in Los Angeles.
