= Alfredo Alonso =

Cuban-born media executive and entrepreneur

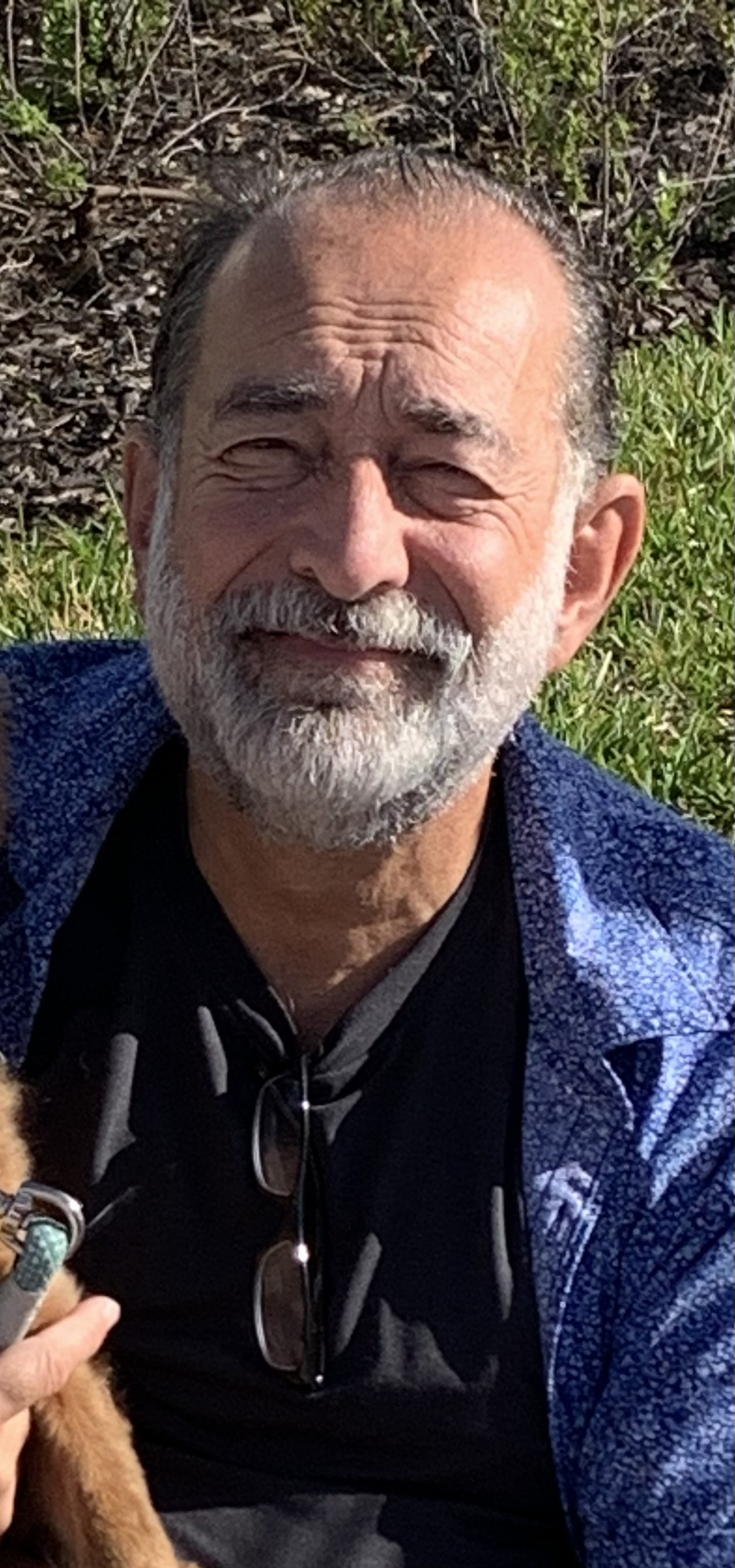

Alfredo Alonso is a Cuba-born media executive. He held senior management positions in Spanish-language media publishing, radio broadcasting, television production, corporate event management and restaurateur. He is known as an innovator of new products to reach the U.S. Hispanic media marketplace. Born in Habana, Cuba in 1960 to parents, Angel Alonso, father and Ana Maria Costal, mother. His family lived in the Bronx in the 1960s and moved to Union City NJ in the 1970s where he attended Emerson High School.

== Radio y Musica ==
His Spanish-language media career started in 1989 when he established a weekly Spanish trade publication Radio y Musica based in Tampa, Florida. The company in addition operated annual Spanish industry conventions Radio Y Musica Convention. The annual event was held in Los Angeles from 1990 to 1997 and expanded to San Juan, Puerto Rico from 1992 to 1995. Radio y Musica became known as the Spanish language Billboard. The publication was the first to create weekly charts by specific Spanish music formats, create radio syndication for weekly countdown shows, produced weekly music video programming and establish local correspondent's in top Hispanic markets. The conventions became a must attend for Spanish radio and label executives. Numerous Spanish language recording artists performed during the annual events including pop star Marc Anthony. Other notable artists to debut during the annual conventions, included Shakira, Alejandro Fernandez, Carlos Vives. He sold the company in 2000 to Radio & Records, Los Angeles, California in an effort to focus attention to his radio holdings. In 2002 Radio y Musica ceased operations after Radio & Records decided to fold its Spanish operations into R&R.

== Clear Channel Radio ==
He served as senior vice president for Clear Channel Radio from 2004 to 2011. In a two-year period Clear Channel Radio converted 25 radio stations to become a leading Spanish language radio provider in the US. The first ever bilingual U.S. format Hurban which was introduced LATINO & PROUD on Mega 101 in Houston, Texas. He also established Spanish Hits La Preciosa Network which was heard in over ten U.S. markets. Overall, 35 stations were converted to numerous Spanish language reaching most of the US Hispanic marketplace. He reported to Clear Channel Radio CEO, John Hogan, while also working closely with local market managers.

== Spanish Broadcasting System ==
In May 1993, he joined Spanish Broadcasting System New York serving as Vice President/Market Manager of WSKQ-FM and WSKQ New York. Later that year Alonso re-launched WSKQ-FM known then as KQ 97.9, a Spanish Adult Contemporary station to a Tropical music based format Mega 97.9, the move quickly established WSKQ into a powerhouse radio station. In a short period Mega 97.9 moved into a top ratings and revenue position. The overall improvement allowed SBS to purchase WPAT FM Suave 93.1 FM New York which became the company's second Spanish FM station under his leadership. Prior to joining the company Alonso guided Spanish Broadcasting System owner Raul Alarcon Jr. in the implementation of KSKQ-FM in Los Angeles into KLAX-FM La X 97.9 in August 1992. KLAX-FM became the first Spanish-language radio station in Los Angeles to reach the number one ranking in Arbitron audience share and a top billing station. After his successful run Alonso left SBS in April 1996 to form his own Spanish radio company, Mega Broadcasting.

== Mega Broadcasting ==
In July 1996, he founded Mega Broadcasting LLC with the purchase of WURD. The gospel station was changed to Mega 900 Philadelphia. The initial success allowed the company to quickly expand in a two-year period. The company purchased additional radio stations in WKDL Washington DC, WNEZ Hartford and WBDN Tampa. As principal owner he served as president and CEO until 1998. [10]. The company was renamed Mega Communications in October 1998 after selling majority stake to New York-based Lindemann Capital in a leveraged buyout for $14.1 million dollars. He remained a limited partner, president and CEO of the new company, during his tenure the company expanded into several new markets, including, Orlando, Boston and New York. In 2002, he transferred to Vice Chairman. In 2004 he stepped down after selling his remaining ownership shares to Adam Lindemann. During his tenure with Mega Communications he was a partner with billionaire businessmen George Lindemann and son Adam Lindemann from 1998 to 2004.

== GOAL merchandising ==
After departing Clear Channel Radio in 2011, he established an Angel investment firm for startup companies, real estate and Spanish themed eateries. He has also served on numerous board of directors.

== Personal life ==
He is married to Eugenia Carolina Alonso (Velazquez) since 1983. He has one son, Adam Alonso; one daughter, Amanda Alonso. He currently resides in Florida and northern New Jersey.
