= John Hogan (businessman) =

John Hogan was CEO and Chairmen of Clear Channel Radio until January 2014, when he retired. A 30-year radio veteran, he was responsible for the operations of nearly 1200 U.S. radio stations and nationally syndicated radio shows; including those of Rush Limbaugh, Ryan Seacrest, Casey Kasem, George Noory, Donald Trump, and Elvis Duran.

In 2007, Hogan was named Group Executive of the Year by Radio & Records magazine. Hogan was named second in the "40 Most Powerful People In Radio" list made by Radio Ink for 2009.
