= List of number-one singles in 1976 (New Zealand) =

This is a list of Number 1 hit singles in 1976 in New Zealand, starting with the first chart dated, 30 January 1976.

== Chart ==
| Week | Artist | Title |
|---|---|---|
| 2 January 1976 | Summer break - no chart | Summer break - no chart |
| 9 January 1976 | Summer break - no chart | Summer break - no chart |
| 16 January 1976 | Summer break - no chart | Summer break - no chart |
| 23 January 1976 | Summer break - no chart | Summer break - no chart |
| 30 January 1976 | ABBA | "SOS" |
| 6 February 1976 | C.W. McCall | "Convoy" |
| 13 February 1976 | C.W. McCall | "Convoy" |
| 20 February 1976 | C.W. McCall | "Convoy" |
| 27 February 1976 | C.W. McCall | "Convoy" |
| 5 March 1976 | Queen | "Bohemian Rhapsody" |
| 12 March 1976 | Queen | "Bohemian Rhapsody" |
| 19 March 1976 | Pussycat | "Mississippi" |
| 26 March 1976 | Pussycat | "Mississippi" |
| 2 April 1976 | Pussycat | "Mississippi" |
| 9 April 1976 | Pussycat | "Mississippi" |
| 16 April 1976 | Pussycat | "Mississippi" |
| 23 April 1976 | Easter holiday - no chart | Easter holiday - no chart |
| 30 April 1976 | Pussycat | "Mississippi" |
| 7 May 1976 | Pussycat | "Mississippi" |
| 14 May 1976 | Pussycat | "Mississippi" |
| 21 May 1976 | Pussycat | "Mississippi" |
| 28 May 1976 | Pussycat | "Mississippi" |
| 4 June 1976 | ABBA | "Fernando" |
| 11 June 1976 | ABBA | "Fernando" |
| 18 June 1976 | ABBA | "Fernando" |
| 25 June 1976 | ABBA | "Fernando" |
| 2 July 1976 | ABBA | "Fernando" |
| 9 July 1976 | ABBA | "Fernando" |
| 16 July 1976 | ABBA | "Fernando" |
| 23 July 1976 | ABBA | "Fernando" |
| 30 July 1976 | Henry Gross | "Shannon" |
| 6 August 1976 | Henry Gross | "Shannon" |
| 13 August 1976 | ABBA | "Fernando" |
| 20 August 1976 | Henry Gross | "Shannon" |
| 27 August 1976 | Elton John & Kiki Dee | "Don't Go Breaking My Heart" |
| 3 September 1976 | Elton John & Kiki Dee | "Don't Go Breaking My Heart" |
| 10 September 1976 | Elton John & Kiki Dee | "Don't Go Breaking My Heart" |
| 17 September 1976 | Elton John & Kiki Dee | "Don't Go Breaking My Heart" |
| 24 September 1976 | ABBA | "Dancing Queen" |
| 1 October 1976 | Elton John & Kiki Dee | "Don't Go Breaking My Heart" |
| 8 October 1976 | Elton John & Kiki Dee | "Don't Go Breaking My Heart" |
| 15 October 1976 | Elton John & Kiki Dee | "Don't Go Breaking My Heart" |
| 22 October 1976 | Elton John & Kiki Dee | "Don't Go Breaking My Heart" |
| 29 October 1976 | Elton John & Kiki Dee | "Don't Go Breaking My Heart" |
| 5 November 1976 | ABBA | "Dancing Queen" |
| 12 November 1976 | The Manhattans | "Kiss & Say Goodbye" |
| 19 November 1976 | ABBA | "Dancing Queen" |
| 26 November 1976 | Sherbet | "Howzat" |
| 3 December 1976 | Sherbet | "Howzat" |
| 10 December 1976 | ABBA | "Money, Money, Money" |
| 17 December 1976 | ABBA | "Dancing Queen" |
| 24 December 1976 | Summer break - no chart | Summer break - no chart |
| 31 December 1976 | Summer break - no chart | Summer break - no chart |

== Notes ==
- Number of number-one singles: 11
- Longest run at number-one: "Mississippi" by Pussycat (11 weeks).
- ABBA would be the most successful artist/group/band of 1976, having four #1 songs.

== See also ==
- 1976 in music
- RIANZ
