= Kiss and Say Goodbye =

Single by The Manhattans

from the album The Manhattans
- B-side: "Wonderful World of Love"
- Released: March 1976
- Recorded: 1975
- Studio: Sigma Sound, Philadelphia, Pennsylvania
- Genre: R&B; Philadelphia soul
- Length: 4:28 (Album full version); 3:29 (Single edited version)
- Label: Columbia Records
- Songwriter: Winfred Lovett
- Producers: Bobby Martin; Manhattans Production, Inc.

The Manhattans singles chronology
"Hurt" (1975)	"Kiss and Say Goodbye" (1976)	"I Kinda Miss You" (1976)

Music video
- "Kiss and Say Goodbye" by The Manhattans (Official Music Video) on YouTube

"Kiss and Say Goodbye" is a 1976 song by American R&B vocal group the Manhattans. It was written by group member Winfred Lovett, the bass singer and songwriter of the group, who did the song's spoken introduction. The song was recorded for the album The Manhattans, released in 1976 by Columbia Records, and was released as a single in March of the same year. "Kiss and Say Goodbye" became a worldwide success, appearing in the musical charts of countless countries, a Top 10 hit in many countries, including No. 1 in the US, Belgium, Netherlands, New Zealand, and in Europe (European Hot 100 Singles). With the exception of the Adult Contemporary Chart, "Kiss and Say Goodbye" was ranked number 1 in the US on all pop and R&B singles charts. The song was one of the biggest hits of 1976 and of the 1970s.

== Background and recording ==
The song was written by Manhattans bass singer Winfred "Blue" Lovett, who also provided the spoken introduction heard in both the full-length LP version and the commercial single (but edited out of the DJ 45). The lyrics and melody came to him late one night. As he later recalled, "Everything was there. I got up about three o'clock in the morning and jotted down the things I wanted to say. I just put the words together on my tape recorder and little piano. I've always thought that when you write slow songs, they have to have meaning. In this case, it's the love triangle situation we've all been through. I figured anyone who's been in love could relate to it. And it seemed to touch home for a lot of folks."

Lovett originally considered the song a country tune more appropriate to be sung by Glen Campbell or Charley Pride. He decided to do it with his group. The Manhattans lead singer Gerald Alston is featured in the song starting to sing after Lovett's spoken introduction.

The original demo of the song was recorded with The Manhattans backing band, "Little Harlem." After hearing a tape of the recording, producer/arranger Bobby Martin decided to re-record the song with backing by MFSB at Sigma Sound Studios in Philadelphia. Recorded in early 1975, Columbia Records officials withheld releasing the song until 14 months later. Winfred "Blue" Lovett had his concerns over when the record came out as well as the record itself. "I was critical, a perfectionist in the studio, and there are still parts of it that make my skin crawl. For example, in one place, the background vocals go off pitch. Somehow, though, that didn't seem to bother anyone else."

== Track listing ==
Side	Song	Length	Interpreters	Writer/composer	Producers	Original album	Release year
A-side	"Kiss and Say Goodbye"	3:29	The Manhattans	Winfred Lovett	Bobby Martin, The Manhattans	The Manhattans	1976
B-side	"Wonderful World of Love"	2:47	The Manhattans	Robert S. Riley Sr.	Bobby Martin, The Manhattans	The Manhattans	1976

- The full length of "Kiss and Say Goodbye" on the album The Manhattans is 4:28. The length of 3:29 on the 7" single is an edited version of the song. The Edited version fades out earlier, because it was considered too long and monotonous for airplay, while the full length version ends on a climactic cadenza on the song's title.

== B-side ==
The B-side of the 7" single contains the song "Wonderful World of Love", which was also recorded by The Manhattans for the album The Manhattans. It was written by Robert S. Riley Sr., songwriter and producer/promotion man of the group, who wrote several songs (lyrics) for them. The song was produced by Bobby Martin and The Manhattans.

== Chart performance ==
Released as a single, the song became a worldwide hit for the group, ranked number 1 on the US Billboard Hot 100 for two weeks, and also on the Billboard R&B chart for one week. The single reaching number 4 on the UK, (where it received Silver certification), and number 7 on the Canada, (where it received Gold certification). The song reached #1 on The New Zealand charts in 1976. In the U.S., the song was the 400th #1 hit on the Billboard Hot 100. It also became just the second single to earn Platinum certification status, after the RIAA established the designation in 1976. (Johnnie Taylor's "Disco Lady" had been the first a few months earlier.) The single ultimately sold 2.5 million copies. Billboard ranked the song as the No. 6 Pop Singles for 1976 and No. 3 Soul Singles for 1976.

Besides being the only No. 1 pop hit for The Manhattans, "Kiss and Say Goodbye" marked 11 years since the group made their first appearance on the Billboard in 1965, with the song "I Wanna Be (Your Everything)" (No. 68 on the Hot 100). "Kiss and Say Goodbye" ended the decade at No. 83 on the Billboard Top 100 Songs of the 1970s.

== Personnel ==
- Written by Winfred Lovett
- Arranged by Bobby Martin
- Spoken voice on intro – Winfred Lovett
- Lead vocal – Gerald Alston
- Music played (uncredited) – MFSB
- Background vocals (uncredited) – The Manhattans, Barbara Ingram, Evette Benton, Carla Benson

Credits

- Producer – Bobby Martin and The Manhattans
- Recording – Kenny Present
- Mastering – Stuart J. Romaine (SJR)
- Engineer – Kenny Present

Companies

- Recorded at Sigma Sound Studios, Philadelphia, Pennsylvania
- Pressed by Columbia Records Pressing Plant, Terre Haute
- Mastered at Frankford/Wayne Mastering Labs

== Charts ==
=== Weekly charts ===
Chart (1976)	Peak position
Australia (Kent Music Report)	4
Austria (Ö3 Austria Top 40)	3
Belgium (Ultratop)	1
Canada Adult Contemporary (RPM)	26
Canada Top Singles (RPM)	7
Europe (Europarade)	1
France (IFOP)	30
Ireland (Irish Charts)	7
Netherlands (Dutch Top 40)	1
Netherlands (Single Top 100)	1
New Zealand (Recorded Music NZ)	1
Norway (VG-lista)	11
South Africa (Springbok Radio)	12
Sweden (Sverigetopplistan)	7
Switzerland (Swiss Hitparade)	7
UK Singles (Official Charts)	4
US Billboard Hot 100	1
US Adult Contemporary (Billboard)	12
US R&B Chart (Billboard)	1
US Cash Box Top 100	1
US Top 100 R&B (Cash Box)	1
US The Singles Chart (Record World)	1
US R&B Singles (Record World)	1
West Germany (Offizielle Deutsche Charts)	10

=== Year-end charts ===
Chart (1976)	Position
Australia (Kent Music Report)	34
Austria (Ö3 Austria Top 40)	17
Belgium (Ultratop)	21
Canada Top 200 Singles (RPM)	88
Netherlands (Dutch Top 40)	5
Netherlands (MegaCharts)	4
New Zealand (Recorded Music)	7
UK Best-Selling (Music Week)	25
UK Top 100 (UK Music Charts)	33
US Pop Singles (Billboard)	6
US Soul Singles (Billboard)	3
US Cash Box Top 100	3
US 100 R&B Singles (Cash Box)	2
US Top Singles Group (Record World)	2
US Top R&B Singles Group (Record World)	1
West Germany (GfK Entertainment)	40

=== Decade-end charts ===
Chart (1970–1979)	Position
US Billboard 100 Songs of the 1970s	83

== Certifications and sales ==
Country (1976)	Certification	Sales
Canada (CRIA)	Gold	75,000*
United Kingdom (BPI)	Silver	250,000*
United States (RIAA)	Platinum	2,500,000
* Sales figures based on certification alone.

== Other versions ==
- UB40 covered the song on their 2005 album Who You Fighting For?. Their version went to #19 on the UK singles chart.
- Joan Osborne included a version on her 2007 album Breakfast in Bed.
- Billy Joe Royal's rendition can be found on his 1989 album Tell It Like It Is.
- The song has also been covered by John Holt, Tierra and Alfred "Pee Wee" Ellis.
- The Singaporean band, Black Dog Bone covered the song in Malay as "Hatiku Luka Lagi"(My Heart Hurts Again)
- The Mexican band Grupo Yndio covered the song in Spanish as Dame un beso y dime adiós.
- This song was covered in Czech by singer Karel Gott and actor Jiří Němeček in 1978 y., the name of Czech version was "Teď už víš, že jsem to já" (You Just Already Know That I Am)
- Hong Kong musician Anita Mui covered the song in Cantonese in 1987 as 珍惜再會時 (Cherish When We Meet Again)

== See also ==
- List of Billboard Hot 100 number-one singles of 1976
- List of number-one R&B singles of 1976 (U.S.)
- List of Cash Box Top 100 number-one singles of 1976
- List of Radio & Records number-one singles of the 1970s
- List of European number-one hits of 1976
- List of Dutch Top 40 number-one singles of 1976
- List of number-one singles in 1976 (New Zealand)
- List of Billboard Year-End Hot 100 singles of 1976
- List of number-one singles and best-selling singles of 1976 (U.K.)
