= Nice and Slow (Jesse Green song) =

Single by Jesse Green

from the album Nice and Slow
- B-side: "Easy"
- Released: 1976
- Genre: Disco
- Length: 3:17 (single version) 4:40 (instrumental remix)
- Label: EMI
- Songwriter: Ken Gibson

Music video
- "Nice And Slow" on YouTube

"Nice and Slow" is a song performed by Jamaican reggae and disco musician Jesse Green, released in 1976. The track was written by Ken Gibson. It was a No. 1 hit in Belgium and the Netherlands, and also reached the top 20 charts of Austria and the United Kingdom. In the UK, the single did not chart until the instrumental remix by Mel Cheren was promoted as the A side.

== Weekly charts ==
Chart (1976)	Peak position
Austria (Ö3 Austria Top 40)	20
Belgium (Ultratop 50 Flanders)	1
Germany (Official German Charts)	24
Netherlands (Dutch Top 40)	1
Netherlands (Single Top 100)	1
UK Singles (OCC)	17
US Dance Club Songs	28
