= Jesse Green (reggae musician) =

Jamaican ska, rocksteady and disco musician

Jesse Green (born Locksley Alphonso Green, 5 July 1948) is a Jamaican ska and disco musician.

He was born in the parish of St. James, Jamaica. As a young boy, Green attended Denham Town Primary School and became fascinated with music by listening to the sound systems, particularly the one belonging to Count Barrett.

Green was a member of the Pioneers and drummed with Jimmy Cliff in the 1970s, recording singles such as "Locks Lee", before launching a solo career in 1976. He scored an international disco hit with a remix of his "Nice and Slow", and also scored several other minor hits in the US and the UK.

Working with songwriters and producers Peter Yellowstone and Steve Voice, Green recorded "Do You Like It Like That". Backed with Ken Gibson's "Nice and Slow", which Gibson co-produced with Dave Howman, it was released on TTR WEAN 18.364 in September 1980.

== Discography ==
=== Studio albums ===
- Nice and Slow (EMI, 1976)
- Come with Me (EMI, 1978)
- 1, 2, 3 Let's Go (Milan, 1981)
- Monopoly (Milan, 1982)
- Roundtrip with Jesse Green (Rapport Music, 1991)
- + Skazzmatic (Slinkaboo, 2009)

=== Singles ===
Year	Title	Peak chart positions	
Year	Title	US Dance	UK
1974	"Hurricane Woman" / "Summer Days"	―	―
1975	"Go Away Dream"	―	―
1976	"Nice and Slow"	3	17
1976	"Flip"	17	26
1977	"Come with Me"	―	29
1977	"Will You, Won't You" / "I Have Won You Baby"	―	―
1977	"I Believe In You"	―	―
1977	"You Came, You Saw, You Conquered"	―	―
1978	"Disco Crazy"	―	―
1980	"Do You Like It Like That"	―	―
1981	"1, 2, 3, Let's Go"	―	―
1985	"Gimmi Gimmi Your Loving"	―	―
1986	"Love & Rebound"	―	―
1992	"You Bring Out the Best in Me"	―	―
1995	"Cupid"	―	―
"—" denotes releases that did not chart or were not released in that territory.
