= Radio & Records =

Trade publication for radio and music industries

- Cover for the final issue of Radio & Records
- Frequency: Weekly
- First issue: October 5, 1973
- Final issue: August 4, 2006 (as independent trade)
- Based in: Los Angeles, California, U.S.
- Language: English
- Website: radioandrecords.com (as of July 7, 2006)
- ISSN: 0277-4860

Radio & Records (R&R) was a trade publication providing news and airplay information for the radio and music industries. It started as an independent trade from 1973 to 2006 until VNU Media took over that year and became a relaunched sister trade to Billboard, until its final issue in 2009.

== History ==
The company was founded in 1973 and published its first issue on October 5 of that year. Founders included Bob Wilson and Robert Kardashian. The publication was issued in a weekly print edition, and it also issued a bi-annual Directory. R&R published its print edition from 1973 through August 4, 2006. Its weekly columns and features were intended to inform and educate the radio industry by each format, in addition to format-specific charts based on radio airplay. With the June 25, 1999 issue, the charts became populated by data from Mediabase, a company that monitors and tracks radio airplay in cities across the US. From 1987 to 2002, the magazine was owned by Westwood One, which collaborated with Radio & Records to use its charts and format editors for WWOne's syndicated radio programs.

On July 6, 2006, VNU, the parent company of Billboard and its sister publication Billboard Radio Monitor, announced the acquisition of Radio & Records, and a month later on August 1, officially took over ownership. R&R then fell under the operations of the Billboard Information Group.

On July 12, 2006, VNU announced that Radio & Records and Billboard Radio Monitor would be integrated into one publication called R&R. The new R&R published charts based on Nielsen BDS data. Both Billboard Radio Monitor and R&R ceased publication as separate trades, with Monitor issuing its last edition on July 14, 2006, after 13 years, and R&R ending their 33-year run as an independent trade with its August 4, 2006 edition.

Radio & Records was relaunched as a magazine under new owners VNU Media on August 11, 2006, as R&R. The company, which has since changed its name to The Nielsen Company, currently publishes 6 daily email publications, 35 weekly email publications, and 4 websites, each serving segments of the radio and records industries.

Like Billboard, which is also owned by VNU Media, Radio & Records used data from Nielsen Broadcast Data Systems to develop the charts showing which records were played each week by leading radio stations. Prior to the merger, Radio & Records had used monitored charts and playlists from Mediabase. The format charts used during its run included CHR/Top 40, Rhythmic, Gospel, Urban, Country, Adult Contemporary, Rock, Christian, Latin and Smooth Jazz.

In 2000, Radio & Records entered the Spanish music business purchasing weekly trade publication Radio Y Musica and Radio y Musica Convention from Alfredo Alonso.

On June 3, 2009, R&R announced that they were immediately ceasing operations after the release of the June 5 issue.

== Use in countdown shows ==
- Countdown America used the CHR/Pop chart in the mid-1980s for this four-hour countdown show variously hosted by John Leader and Dick Clark.
- Casey Kasem used the Radio & Records charts for his countdown shows in the latter part of his career:
  - The CHR/Pop chart was used for Westwood One's Casey's Top 40 (January 1989 – March 1998) and Premiere Networks' American Top 40 (March 1998 – October 2000, and August 2001 – January 2004). The current Ryan Seacrest AT40 show uses Mediabase 24/7.
  - The Hot AC chart was used for both Casey's Hot 20 and the Hot AC version of American Top 20.
  - The AC chart was used for Casey's Countdown and the AC version of American Top 20.
- Rockin' America Top 30 Countdown also used Radio & Records charts in the mid to late 1980s, with Scott Shannon as the host of Westwood One's weekly countdown show that aired on over 200 radio stations during the 1980s.
- The TV show Solid Gold used the CHR/Pop chart during its first season.
- The Country chart was used for CMT's Country Countdown USA, Jeff Foxworthy's The Foxworthy Countdown and Bob Kingsley's Country Top 40, but these have switched to Mediabase 24/7 chart data. Radio & Records also supplied information for past syndicated country music countdown programs (including The Weekly Country Music Countdown (1981-early 2000s), and it was the source used on the syndicated daily radio program Solid Gold Country.
- The CHR/Top 40 chart was used for Rick Dees Weekly Top 40 (1985–1995, 1997–2005).
- Red Letter Rock 20
- The Christian CHR/Pop chart was used for Weekend 22, a two-hour program hosted by Jeremy "JGonzo" Gonzalez from 2002 to 2008, currently hosted by Josh Ashton.
  - The Christian AC chart was used for Weekend Top 20 (formerly called Weekend Top 25 from 2003 to 2006), a two-hour spin-off program of Weekend 22 hosted by Lisa Williams from 2003 to 2005, Scott Smith from 2005 to 2008, and Kurt Wallace from 2008 to present.
- The Urban Contemporary chart was used for The Countdown, a two-hour program hosted by Walt "Baby" Love.
- The syndicated retro-countdown show What's Your Twenty uses archived issues of R&R in addition to Billboard Magazine and Cashbox Magazine for the program.

== See also ==
- List of Radio & Records number-one singles
- Billboard Radio Monitor (1993–2006)
- The "new" R&R
